= Cairngorm Plateau disaster =

1971 Scottish mountaineering disaster

Coordinates: 57°05′25″N 03°40′25″W

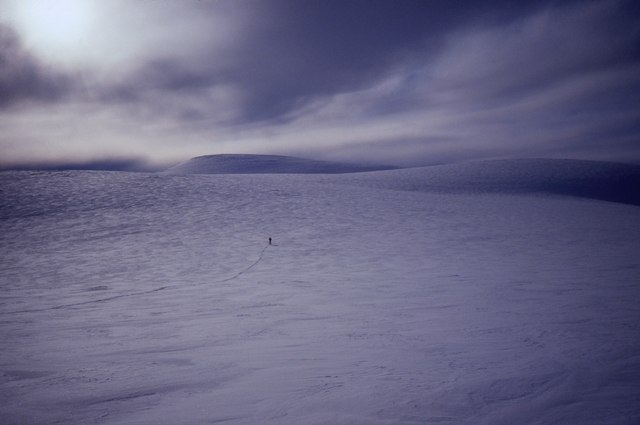
View south from near the scene of the 1971 disaster (this photograph was taken in winter 1992)

The Cairngorm Plateau disaster, also known as the Feith Buidhe disaster, occurred in November 1971 when six fifteen-year-old students from Edinburgh's Ainslie Park High School and their two leaders embarked on a two-day navigational expedition in a remote area of the Cairngorms in the Scottish Highlands.

While the group was on the high plateau, the weather deteriorated and they decided to head for the Curran shelter, a rudimentary refuge, which they failed to reach. The group became stranded in the open for two nights in a blizzard. Five youths and the leader's assistant died of exposure. A sixth student and the group's leader survived the ordeal with severe hypothermia and frostbite. The disaster is regarded as Britain's worst mountaineering accident.

A fatal accident inquiry led to formal requirements being placed on leaders for school expeditions. After acrimony in political, mountaineering and police circles, the Curran shelter was demolished in 1975.

== Background ==
=== Cairngorms ===
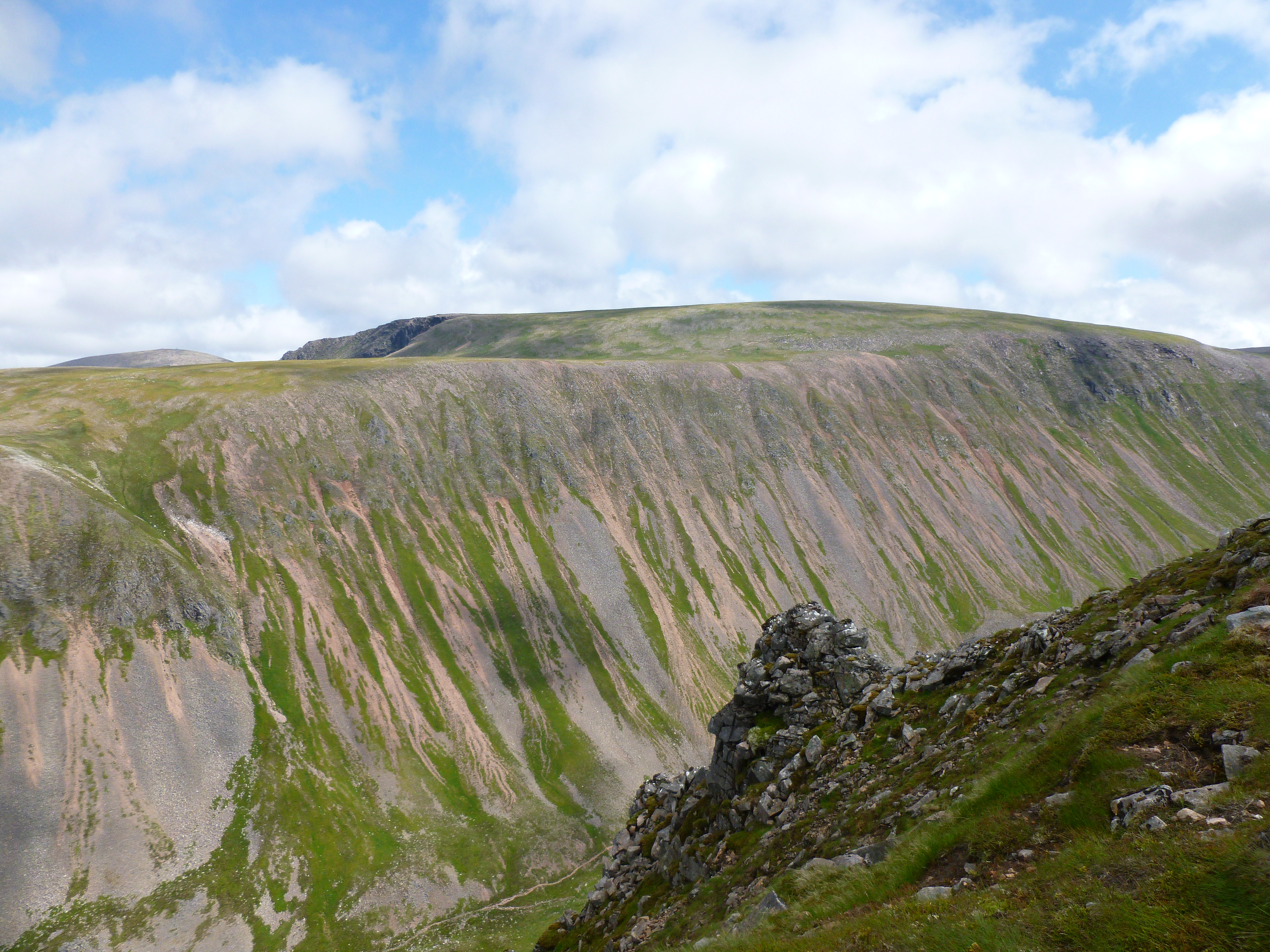
The Cairngorm Plateau, seen from across the Lairig Ghru

The Cairngorms are a mountainous region of Scotland that are named after the 1,245-metre (4,085 ft) Cairn Gorm Mountain, which overlooks Aviemore, the main town in the area. The central region is an area of high granite plateau at about 1,200 metres (3,900 ft) and is deeply dissected by long glacial valleys, which run roughly from north to south. Between two of the valleys, the Lairig Ghru and the Lairig an Laoigh, extends the Cairngorm Plateau (Note: "Cairngorm Plateau" is the name of this specific plateau. To its west is the Moine Mhor, Great Moss, with the greatest number of Munros.) of granite boulders and gravel where Cairn Gorm itself and the 1,309-metre (4,295 ft) Ben Macdui, the highest mountain in the Cairngorms and the second-highest in the British Isles, are the main summits. The edges of the plateaux are in places steep cliffs of granite and popular for skiing, rock climbing and ice climbing.

=== Weather conditions ===
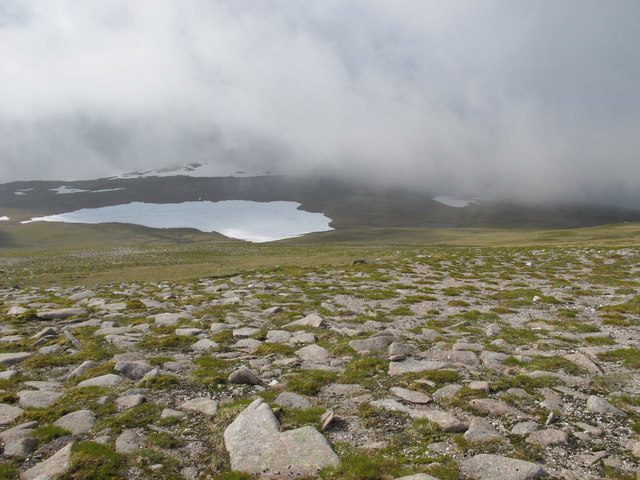
Ben Macdui from the Cairngorm Plateau in June 2014

Their height, distances and severe and changeable weather make the Cairngorms the most challenging range for climbers in the United Kingdom. Snow can fall at any time during the year, and snow patches can persist all summer. For snow and ice climbing, the area is the most dependable in Britain. The plateau has a subarctic climate and supports only sparse tundra vegetation. The shattered terrain is more like the high ground in the arctic regions of Canada or Norway than the European Alps or North American Rocky Mountains. The weather often deteriorates rapidly with elevation, even when there are moderate conditions 150 metres below the plateau, the top can be stormy or misty and there can be icy or powdery snow. Even when no snow is falling, the wind can whip up snow on the ground to produce whiteout conditions a few metres above the surface, and snowdrifts can build up rapidly in sheltered places. Gravel can be blown through the air, and walking can be impossible. Scottish mountaineer Adam Watson explained how gale conditions can be extremely challenging on the plateau and make it difficult, if not impossible, to walk, see beyond a few metres, breathe and communicate with other party members. On 20 March 1986, a wind speed of 173 mph (278 km/h) was measured at Cairngorm summit weather station. (Note: The Cairngorm weather station is at 1,245 metres (4,085 ft) and has been operating since 1977.)

=== Trails and buildings in Cairngorms ===
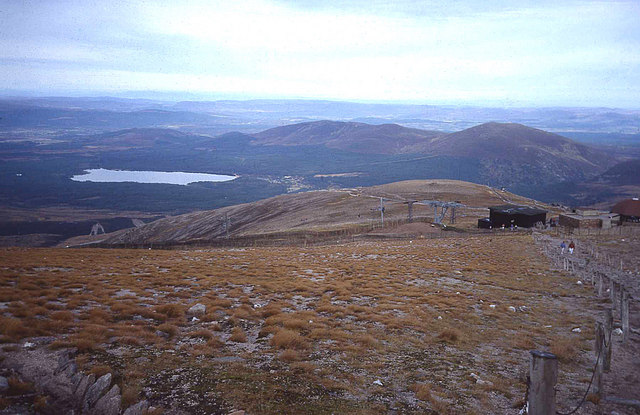
From the path up to Cairn Gorm summit, looking back down to Ptarmigan restaurant, October 1991

The valleys between the individual plateaux were used as drove roads by cattle drovers, who built rough protective shelters for their arduous journeys. Even today, between the Pass of Drumochter and the Lecht there are no paved roads over the Speyside–Deeside watershed, and the passes are impossible, even for four-wheel-drive vehicles. The Lairig Ghru pass between Speyside and Deeside is about 19 miles (30 km) long and reaches its greatest height at Pools of Dee at 810 metres (2,660 ft), where the water may be frozen over even in midsummer. The route has a total ascent of about 670 metres (2,200 ft) between habitation at Coylumbridge in Speyside and Linn of Dee. Towards the end of the 19th century, as droving died out, deer stalking estates were flourishing and the shelters were developed into bothies to provide improved, though still primitive, accommodation for gamekeepers. (Note: Gamekeepers or deer watchers, although they kept an eye open for poachers, were occupied mainly with monitoring the movements of herds of deer so that deer-stalking clients could be guided to the best locations.) In modern times, the bothies have been taken over by the Mountain Bothies Association for use by trekkers and climbers to provide shelter and rough sleeping accommodation.

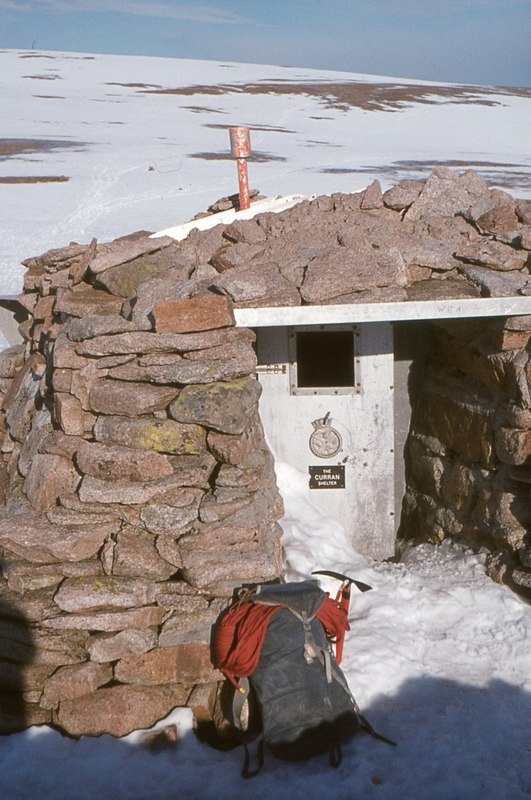
The Curran shelter in 1975

Starting in 1960 an area in the Northern Corries between Aviemore and Cairn Gorm was developed for alpine skiing. A road was constructed to an elevation of 650 metres (2,130 ft) in Coire Cas where a ski centre was built and ski lifts and tows were installed, one going up to a new restaurant, the Ptarmigan, at 1,080 metres (3,540 ft). In good weather it was an easy walk to the Cairngorm Plateau. (Note: The walk could be dangerous because it was apparently so easy and the presence of large numbers of people was causing environmental damage. When the ski lift was replaced with a funicular railway in 2001 people ascending on the railway were no longer permitted to go out onto the plateau.)

After the Second World War, the Scottish Council for Physical Recreation established Glenmore Lodge, beside Loch Morlich, on the road between Aviemore and the ski centre. In 1959, it moved to a purpose-built centre nearby (later the Scottish Centre for Outdoor Training, which provides training for leadership in mountaineering), and staff were on the spot to help in mountaineering emergencies.

In the 1960s, a military group erected, without permission from the local authorities, the St Valery, El Alamein and Curran shelters on the Cairngorm Plateau. (Note: Allen & Davidson, Baker, Duff and Watson give varying accounts of how and why the shelters came to be built. It is generally agreed that they were built in the 1960s by a group from a single military establishment and that El Alamein and St Valery had plaques bearing the insignia the 51st Highland Division, which fought in these battles in World War II. However, Ray Sefton, once the leader of the RAF Kinloss MRT, is reported (in a blog by David Whalley, another one-time leader of KMRT) as saying that they were built in memory of the 51st Highland Division by apprentices from HMS Caledonia, an onshore base in Rosyth Dockyard, led by CSM Jim Curran of the Royal Marines. The shelters were to support cross-country skiing, which was then seen as appropriate for the Cairngorm plateau. Greg Strange states the Curran shelter was built at the request of the Cairngorm Mountain Rescue Association. The sources agree that HMS Caledonia apprentices demolished Curran and St Valery in 1975.) They could often become buried in snowdrifts but they attracted hikers and campers. The Curran shelter was of metal covered with boulders, had a floor area 4 by 2 metres (12 by 7 ft) and was beside Lochan Buidhe, the highest standing water in Britain. Predicting that it would attract inexperienced walkers, Adam Watson and the Mountain Rescue Committee of Scotland wrote to the Nature Conservancy to point out the danger of a shelter in that location, but nothing was done about the matter.

=== Mountain rescue ===
Mountain rescue in the central Cairngorms was then the responsibility of the Scottish North Eastern Counties Constabulary. The mountain rescue teams consisted entirely of unpaid civilian volunteers and were co-ordinated by the Mountain Rescue Committee of Scotland, with the Cairngorm Mountain Rescue Team (MRT) being the first to be called on for assistance on the Cairngorm Plateau. They, in turn, could request helicopter support from RAF Kinloss. The Braemar MRT and Kinloss RAF MRT (Note: RAF Kinloss, as well as giving helicopter support, also operated an RAF mountain rescue team.) would also attend if there was a major incident, or if the location for the rescue was uncertain.

== School expedition ==
=== Expedition leadership ===
In November 1971, a party of 14 students from Ainslie Park School, in Edinburgh, was staying with three leaders at Edinburgh Council's Lagganlia outdoor training centre in Kincraig. In overall charge was the 23-year-old Ben Beattie, the school's instructor in outdoor education with the Mountain Instructor Certificate, who had quite extensive mountaineering experience, but his experience in the Cairngorms in winter was very limited. Also on the expedition was Beattie's girlfriend, 21-year-old Catherine Davidson, who was a final-year student at Dunfermline College of Physical Education and was approved by the school to help run the mountaineering club. She had less overall mountaineering experience, but she had twice been in the Cairngorms in winter. Accompanying them was Shelagh Sunderland, aged 18, who had just started as a Lagganlia volunteer trainee instructor and had no experience in the Cairngorms.

=== Start of expedition ===
Map of central Cairngorms showing shelters and features relating to the 1971 disaster

On Saturday, 20 November, the party set off on a two-day navigational exercise to cross the Cairngorm Plateau from Cairn Gorm south to Ben Macdui. Because they were very late in starting (it was almost 11:00 when they left Lagganlia), they used the Cairngorm ski lift to get to the plateau, and as planned they separated into two groups: the more experienced group, made up of mostly boys led by Beattie, set off and was followed by the less experienced group of four girls and two boys and their two female guides, Davidson and Sunderland. After crossing the plateau, both groups were to descend to the Corrour Bothy, at a much lower level in the Lairig Ghru, where they would spend the night. Sunset was just before 16:00. The Davidson group would then return along the Lairig Ghru, while the Beattie group would return by traversing Cairn Toul and Braeriach on the far side of the valley. In case of emergency, each group was to go to the Curran shelter, high on the plateau. That plan had been approved in advance by the head of Lagganlia, John Paisley, who could forbid unsuitable expeditions.

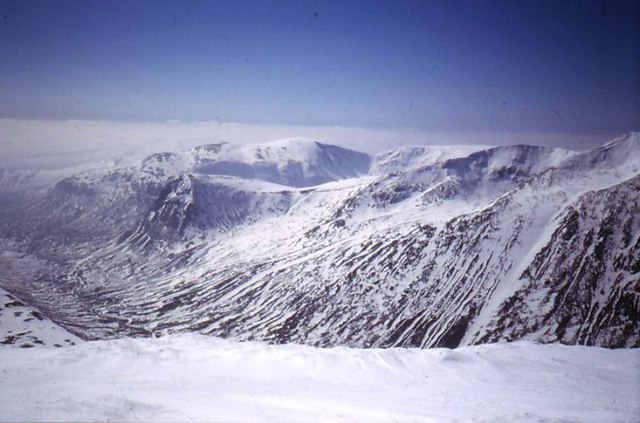
Lairig Ghru seen from Ben Macdui. Corrour Bothy is in the glacial valley to the extreme left of the picture, too small to be seen.

Shortly after the groups set off the weather deteriorated, as had been forecast to the groups' knowledge, the Beattie party successfully navigated to the Curran shelter, where they dug snow from the door and spent the night. Davidson, worried that her group would not be able to find the shelter in white-out conditions (she knew that it could become completely covered in snow), decided on a forced bivouac out on the plateau. She chose a site at a slight dip at the head of the Feith Buidhe burn, about 460 metres (500 yd) east of Lochan Buidhe and the Curran shelter. Beattie was not worried about the missing people because he assumed they had gone to another shelter.

=== Davidson's group ===
On Saturday afternoon Davidson abandoned the original plan when the conditions became poor and some of the students became distressed. Instead of navigating directly to the Curran shelter, she headed slightly downhill and aimed for the Feith Buidhe stream in the hope of following it up to Lochan Buidhe to reach the shelter beside the lochan (small loch). The burn was obliterated by snow, so she gave up hope of finding Curran. She prepared to bivouac in what, unknown to her, was a major accumulation area for snow. John Duff, the leader of the Braemar MRT, later considered that to be a serious mistake: "to attempt a winter bivouac, in a storm, on a Cairngorms plateau, is literally a life or death decision, and a last option". He also wrote that the major mistake was even to have considered "an appallingly over-ambitious expedition for teenage children" and laid the blame on all those who had made and accepted the plans.

They sheltered in sleeping bags and bivouac sacs in the lee of a snow wall they built. At first, they kept up good spirits. However, as the snow became deeper through the night, there was panic because of the fear of being buried or suffocated. With daylight on Sunday, a boy could be heard shouting under the surface, and Sunderland was barely conscious. Davidson and the other boy set off to get help but got only a few metres before they were forced back. Throughout the day the blizzard raged. After dark they could see the flares of a search party, but their shouts were not heard and they had lost their own flares in the snow. That night, the young teens were becoming delirious and were dying. On Monday morning, Davidson set off by herself to try to get help.

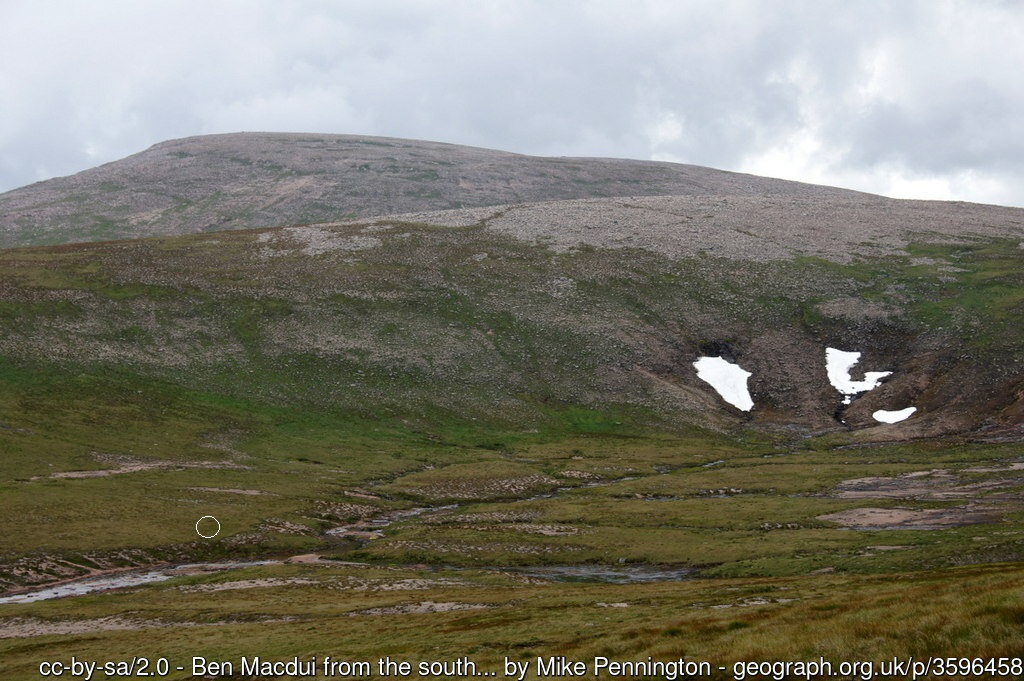
Approximate location of the bivouac (white circle – estimated from Duff (2001) p105 photo) beside the Feith Buidhe burn, seen in late summer without any snow cover. View south from Cairn Lochan towards Ben Macdhui in the distance. (Notes: photo taken 5 August 2013; the photographer was not involved in this Wikipedia contribution or the annotation.)

=== Beattie's group on Sunday ===
The previous day, on Sunday, Beattie's group had great difficulty getting out of the hut because of the deep snow, and in arduous conditions, they were scarcely able to descend from the plateau. After dark, at 16:30, they reached Rothiemurchus Hut, where they telephoned Lagganlia, and met their transport vehicle at 17:30. The school students were returned to Lagganlia, and Beattie and Paisley drove to the ski centre, where they were unable to learn any news. They went to Glenmore Lodge and the Aviemore police station, where, at 19:00, they reported Davidson's party missing. Three pairs of rescuers were immediately dispatched from Glenmore Lodge into the night blizzard; the Cairngorm, RAF Kinloss, Braemar and Aberdeen MRTs were called out. The mountain rescue teams made their preparations so that they could start hours before first light on Monday.

== Rescue attempts ==
In stormy but moderating conditions on 22 November 1971, 50 men were searching with helicopter support. In the morning, the Braemar MRT, travelling from the south, reached Corrour Bothy, only to find it unoccupied. It was at about 10:30 that Davidson was spotted from a helicopter. The Whirlwind helicopter had been dispatched from RAF Leuchars in Fife, and the pilot attempted to fly up the line of Glen Shee, but turbulence meant that he had to reduce airspeed to 70 knots (130 km/h; 81 mph), with a groundspeed less than walking pace. At Pools of Dee, he was reduced to a hover and was unable to ascend to the plateau so he took a wide detour to Glenmore Lodge. There, the crew was asked to make an airborne check of various shelters, without any delay for refuelling. At the Curran shelter, there was nothing to be seen, but as they turned to go back to Glenmore Lodge, they spotted what they thought was a red tent.

Edging closer and without reference points in the whiteout, they realised that they had got very close to a person on her hands and knees. Davidson was still up on the plateau and trying to crawl for help. Two crew were unloaded 64 metres (70 yd) away, the closest they could manage. Then, they reached the casualty but could not carry her to the helicopter because her legs were locked in a kneeling position. The helicopter could get no closer because applying power caused the rotor wash to blow snow into the air, completely obscuring visibility. One of the crew jumped out to lead in the correct direction by using the winch wire. There was no sign of anyone else from Davidson's group. Davidson was taken by helicopter to Aviemore, where she was met by ambulance. She was in the advanced stages of hypothermia and her hands were frozen solid, but although she was confused and barely able to speak, she managed to let her rescuers know that the rest of the party was close to where she had been rescued. She could say only the words "Burn – lochan – buried" to rescuer Brian Hall, but that gave sufficient clues.

By then, the cloud base had become lower, and no helicopter could get nearby, but several search teams on foot converged on the location of the catastrophic bivouac through snow sometimes waist deep. The Glenmore Lodge instructor John Cunningham along with Beattie and Paisley were the first to find the scene. The bodies of six teenage students and the assistant were dug out, one from a depth of 1.2 metres (4 ft). All were dead except the last person to be uncovered, Raymond Leslie, who was still breathing. He was cared for by a doctor from the Braemar MRT on his first serious call-out. At 15:00, a Royal Navy Sea King helicopter arrived, guided by the leader of the RAF Kinloss MRT walking ahead firing flares. Leslie, the surviving boy, was airlifted to Raigmore Hospital, where he and Davidson eventually recovered. Some of the instructors from Glenmore Lodge had been out for 20 hours so, in the darkness, the dead were left on the mountain to be brought down the next day.

== Aftermath ==
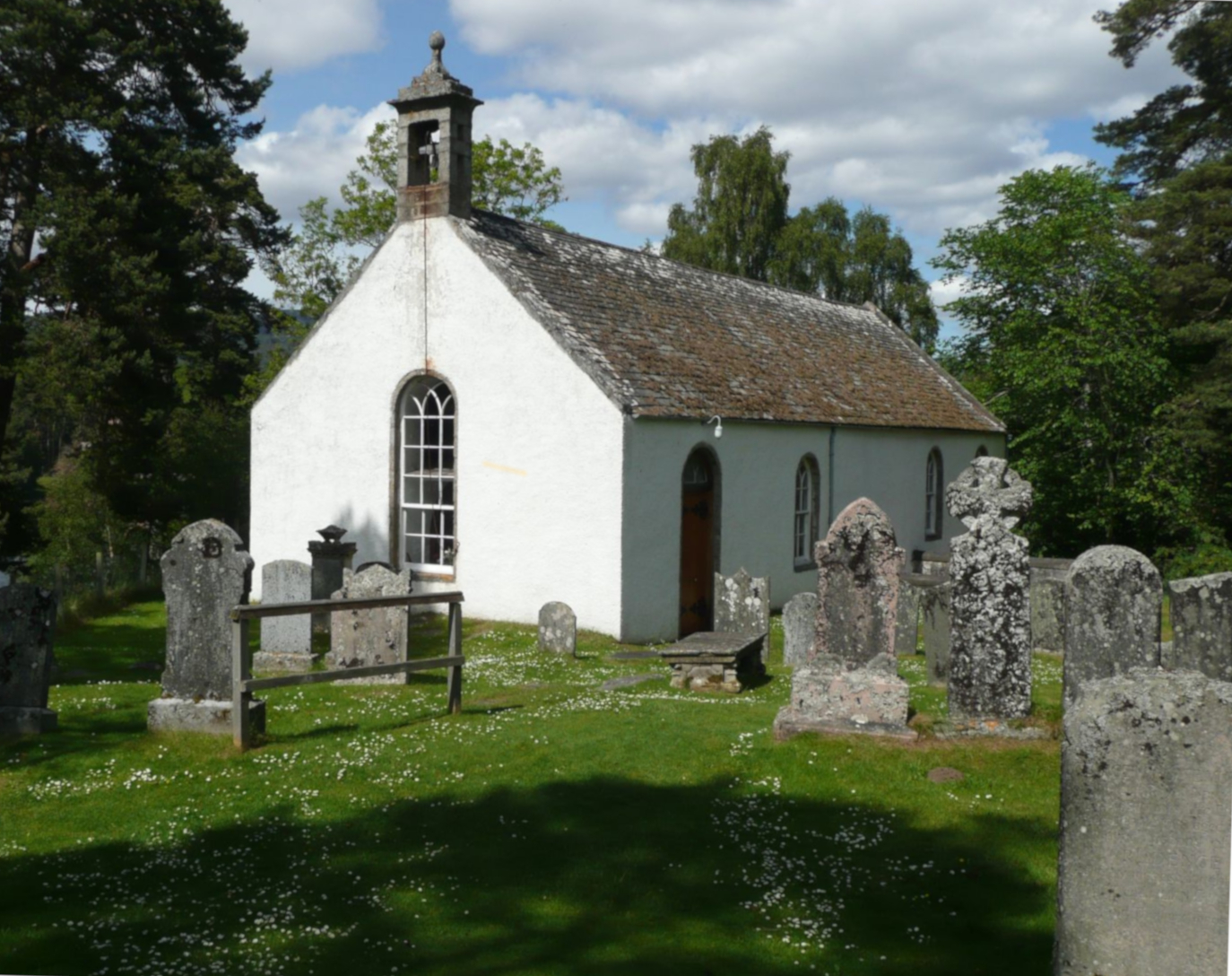
Insh Church

A memorial service to the victims was held at Insh parish church on 28 November 1971. (Note: The school pupils who died were Carol Bertram, Susan Byrne, Lorraine Dick, Diane Dudgeon and William Kerr. The boy who survived was Raymond Leslie.) The Secretary of State for Scotland was asked about the Cairngorms Disaster in parliament and there was a suggestion that all local authorities should follow the lead recently set by Edinburgh Education Authority and ban school expeditions from mountaineering in winter.

At the fatal accident inquiry held in Banff in February 1972, Adam Watson was the chief expert witness for the Crown. It emerged that the consent form issued to parents did not say that winter mountaineering was involved. Also, only one of the parents had been told the outing was going to be to the Cairngorms. The inquiry reported that the deaths had been due to cold and exposure. It recommended

1. there should be special regard for fitness and training,
2. parents should be given fuller information about outdoor activities,
3. parties should be led by fully qualified instructors and accompanied by certified teachers,
4. suitable locations for summer and winter expeditions should be identified in consultation with mountaineering organisations,
5. experts should advise on whether high-level shelters should be removed,
6. the mountain rescue teams were praised and consideration should be given to supporting the teams financially and generally,
7. following any future disaster there should be closer liaison between authorities and parents.

The jury did not want to discourage future adventurous outdoor activities. The advocate for the parents suggested that the overall leader of the expedition and the principal of Lagganlia should be found at fault, but the inquiry did not make any finding of fault.

The recommendation concerning the possible removal of high-level shelters was to become a cause of major disagreement. Traditional "bothies" were built for stalkers and gamekeepers and were in the valleys. The shelters being questioned were modern ones built high up on the plateau. The argument to keep them was that any shelter in an emergency was better than none, the opinion of Cairngorm MRT, Banffshire County Council and local estate owners. However, the Braemar MRT, most mountaineering bodies, the Chief Constable of police and Adam Watson thought that they should be removed. More and more experts and politicians became involved, and in July 1973, the Secretary of State for Scotland launched a formal consultation. Eventually, the Scottish Office decided that it had no powers in the matter. In February 1974, at a meeting that excluded everyone except the local authority, police and mountaineering experts, a decision for removal was taken, which occurred after further argument.

The disaster had a major effect on mountaineering in Britain, particularly concerning adventure expeditions for children. At a political level, urged on by the press, there were proposals to ban mountaineering courses for children or at least to require formal certification for their leaders. Compulsory insurance for mountaineers also came on the agenda. The British Mountaineering Council, representing practising amateur mountaineers and their clubs, was initially opposed to all that and considered that a bureaucracy should not be supervising adventure. On the other hand, the Mountain Leader Training Board, composed of educators, was in favour on grounds of safety and teaching environmental awareness. Eventually, a compromise was reached, with the two bodies combining and a Mountain Leadership Certificate becoming required for educational expeditions.

Interviewed in 2011, the father of one of the girls who had died said that he thought the trip was simply to the Lagganlia centre, and he had no idea that they were going to be climbing the mountains. On the Sunday night, a policeman had come to the door to say they would be late home. Even Edinburgh had strong wind and deep snow. Later in the night, a newspaper reporter arrived and said that the whole party was missing. It was only on Monday afternoon, when the parents were gathered at the school, that the news came that five of their children were dead. The father explained that the boy who survived was the smallest student in the party; maybe the others (two women leaders, four girls and one boy) had been huddling round him to protect him from the cold. In 2015, someone who had been a pupil at the school in 1971 wrote, "The school was in mourning for some time after that and I don't think that Mr Chalmers, the headmaster, ever really recovered".

Ben Beattie was appointed to a job at Glenmore Lodge, but in 1978 he was killed while climbing Nanda Devi East, in Garhwal Himalaya. Catherine Davidson completed her course and then emigrated to Canada in 1978. Raymond Leslie became a top-class canoeist and went on to represent Britain. Edinburgh Council still runs Lagganlia.

The 50th anniversary was marked in 2021.
