= Bynack More =

Mountain in Scotland

Coordinates: 57.13822°N 3.584716°W

- A' Bheithneag Mhòr
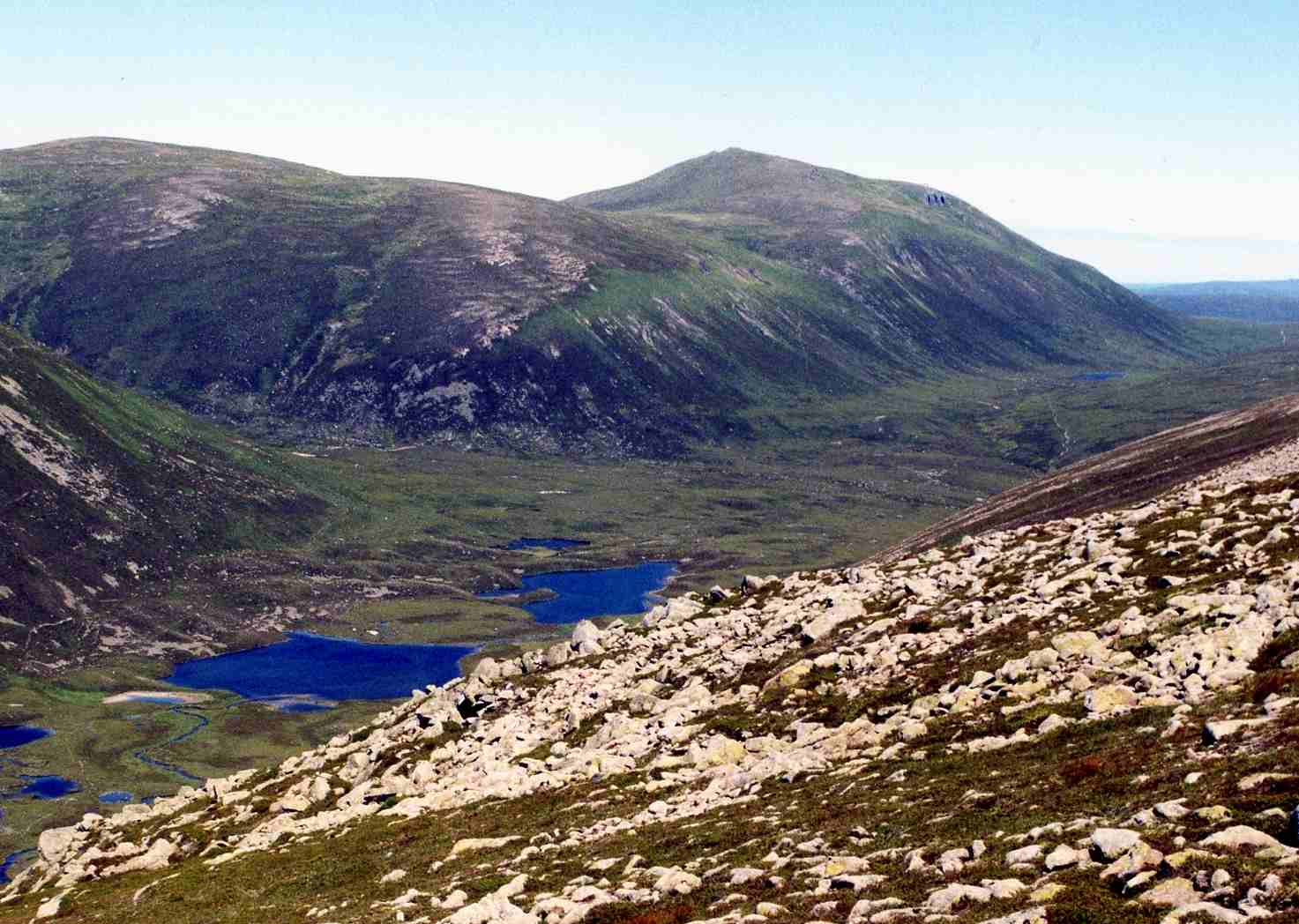
- Bynack More seen from the slopes of Beinn a' Chaorainn across the Dubh Lochan.

Highest point
- Elevation: 1,090 m (3,580 ft)
- Prominence: 283 m (928 ft)
- Parent peak: Ben Macdui
- Listing: Munro, Marilyn

Naming
- English translation: Vague
- Language of name: see text
- Pronunciation: Scottish Gaelic: [ə ˈvenak ˈvoːɾ]

Geography
- Location within Scotland
- Location: Cairngorms, Scotland
- Parent range: Grampians
- OS grid: NJ042063
- Topo map: OS Landranger 36, OS Explorers 404, 403

Listed summits of Bynack More
Name	Grid ref	Height	Status
A’Choinneach	NJ032048	1,017 m (3,337 ft)	Munro Top
Bynack Beg	NJ036068	970 m (3,180 ft)	Munro Top

Bynack More (Scottish Gaelic: A' Bheithneag Mhòr or Beinn Bheithneag) is a Scottish Mountain that is situated in the Cairngorms range, 16 kilometres east-south-east of the town of Aviemore in the Highland region.

== Overview ==
Bynack More is a Munro and a Marilyn which reaches a height of 1090 metres (3576 feet) and stands slightly detached from the other peaks of the range in the north eastern corner. Because of this it tends to be ascended in a single mountain trip. It is typical of many of the Cairngorm mountains in that it is crowned by a large plateau; however, it does look conical when viewed from some angles. The plateau has huge granite tors dotted across it, known as the Barns of Bynack. The translation of the mountain's name from the Gaelic is unclear - some books give it as a “kerchief or a cap” from the Gaelic beannag, others give it as “big little mountain” from beinneag while other sources suggest "chimney pot" from binneag, referring to the tors on the summit. In the past Bynack More has been known as Ben Bynack and Caiplich, named after the Water of Caiplich which rises on the mountains eastern slopes and flows into the Avon and then the Spey.

== Geography ==
Bynack More is an elongated hill which is orientated north to south, the eastern slopes are steep and rocky as they drop 300 metres vertically to the headwaters of the Water of Caiplich. The hill has two subsidiary tops. Bynack Beag (964 metres) lies a kilometre to the north west and can be easily climbed when approaching the mountain from the north; Bynack More and Bynack Beag are twins and look impressive from the north above Strath Nethy. The other top is A’Choinneach (Boggy Hill) which, at 1017 metres, used to be a Munro but was demoted in the 1981 tables reorganisation. This lies 1.5 kilometres south west and is an easy climb with an ascent of less than 80 metres. Bynack More can be climbed along with the nearby Cairn Gorm. The two are joined by a high col to the south west called The Saddle (807 metres). However, it is the impressive granite formation known as the Barns of Bynack that is the highlight of the plateau; they lie 500 metres south of the summit and the highest ones are roughly six metres high.

== Ascents ==
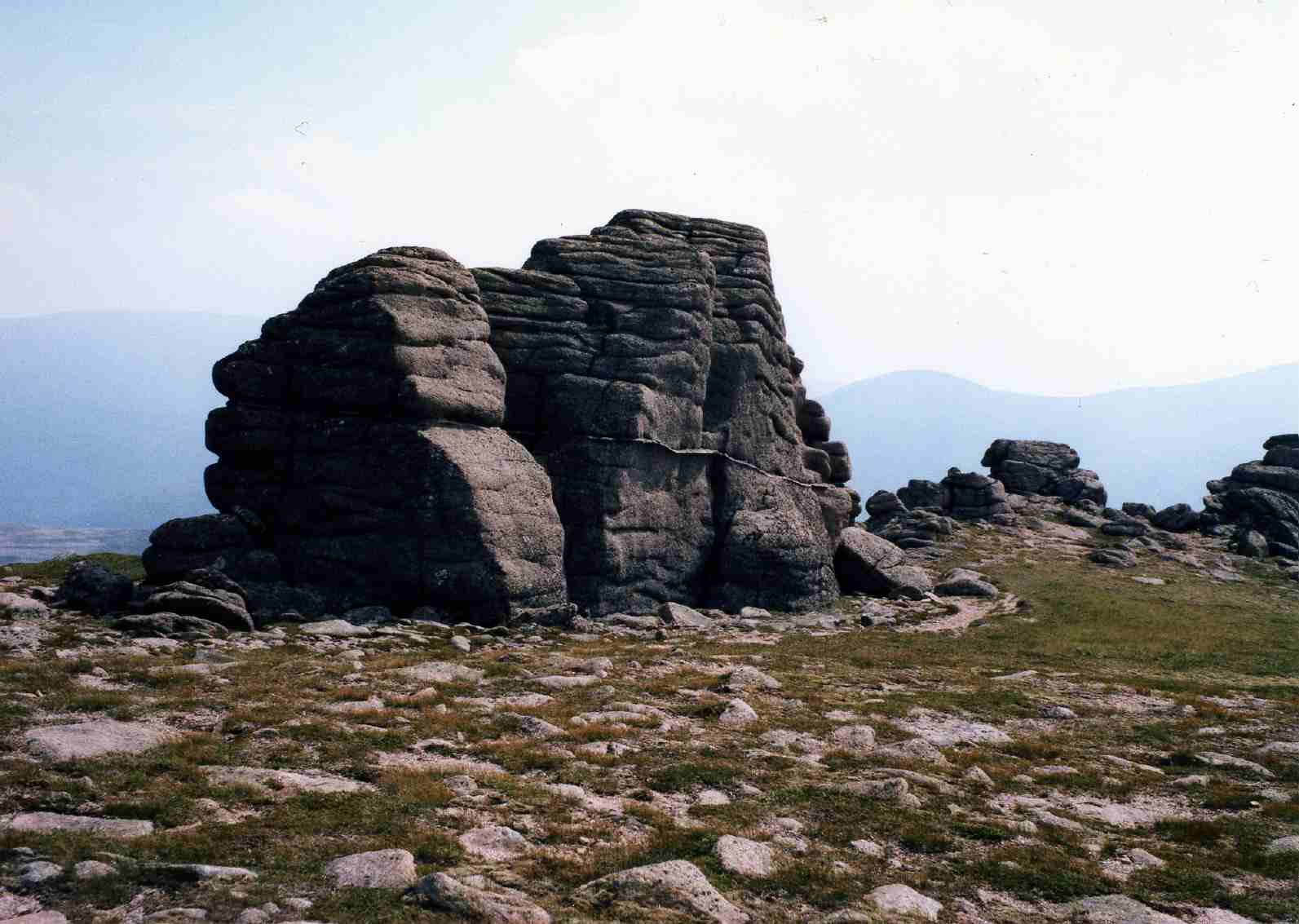
The Barns of Bynack.

The most popular ascent of Bynack More starts from Loch Morlich at grid reference NH972098 and follows a good path passing through the attractive Ryvoan Pass with the charming Lochan Uaine (green lochan). The path swings east crossing the River Nethy and then the northern ridge of Bynack More is ascended to the summit. It is also possible to start from the car park at the Cairn Gorm ski centre (grid reference NH989061) and ascend Cairn Gorm first before carrying onto Bynack More via The Saddle, though this is quite a rough walk. The summit cairn is made up of granite boulders and provides a unique view of Cairn Gorm across the craggy flanks of Strath Nethy; the Ben Avon plateau is also well seen.
