= Cairngorms =

Mountain range in the eastern Highlands of Scotland

- IUCN category IV (habitat/species management area)
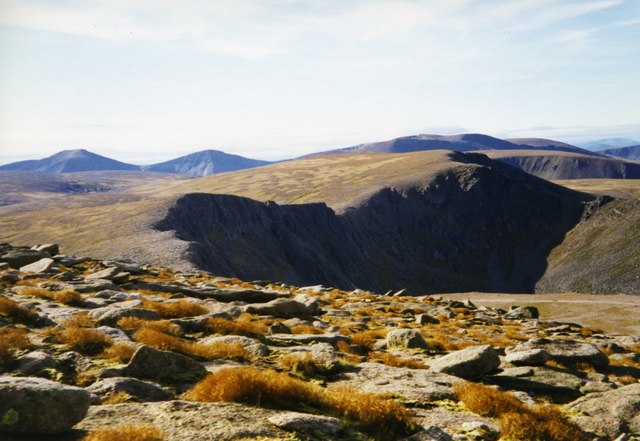
- Cairn Gorm view over Coire an t-Sneachda, a glacial cirque

- Location within Scotland
- Location: Highland, Aberdeenshire and Moray, Scotland
- Nearest city: Inverness, Aberdeen
- Coordinates: 57.10°N 03.68°W
- Area: 292 km^{2} (113 sq mi)
- Established: 1987
- Governing body: NatureScot

The Cairngorms (Scottish Gaelic: Am Monadh Ruadh) are a mountain range in the eastern Highlands of Scotland closely associated with the mountain Cairn Gorm. The Cairngorms became part of Scotland's second national park (the Cairngorms National Park) on 1 September 2003. Although the Cairngorms give their name to, and are at the heart of, the Cairngorms National Park, they only form one part of the national park, alongside other hill ranges such as the Angus Glens and the Monadhliath, and lower areas like Strathspey.

The Cairngorms consists of high plateaux at about 1,000–1,200 m (3,300–3,900 ft) above sea level, above which domed summits (the eroded stumps of once much higher mountains) rise to around 1,300 m (4,300 ft). Many of the summits have tors, free-standing rock outcrops that stand on top of the boulder-strewn landscape. In places, the edges of the plateau form steep cliffs of granite and they are excellent for skiing, rock climbing and ice climbing. The Cairngorms form an arctic-alpine mountain environment, with tundra-like characteristics and long-lasting snow patches. This area is home to bird species such as ptarmigan, dotterel, snow bunting, curlew and red grouse, as well as mammals such as mountain hare. The plateau also supports Britain's only herd of reindeer (albeit semi-domesticated). Surrounding the central massif are many remnants of the Caledonian forest in straths and glens of the Rivers Spey and Dee. These forests support many species that are rare elsewhere in Britain, including red squirrels, pine marten, wood ants, Scottish crossbill, capercaillie and crested tit.

There are no glaciers, but snow can fall in any month of the year, and snow patches usually persist all summer; for snow and ice climbing, the area is the most dependable in Britain. The mountains are also popular for hill-walking, ski touring and climbing, and there are three alpine ski centres in the range, at Cairn Gorm, The Lecht and Glenshee.

The range lies in the Scottish council areas of Aberdeenshire, Moray and Highland, and within the counties of Aberdeenshire, Inverness-shire and Banffshire.

== Etymology ==
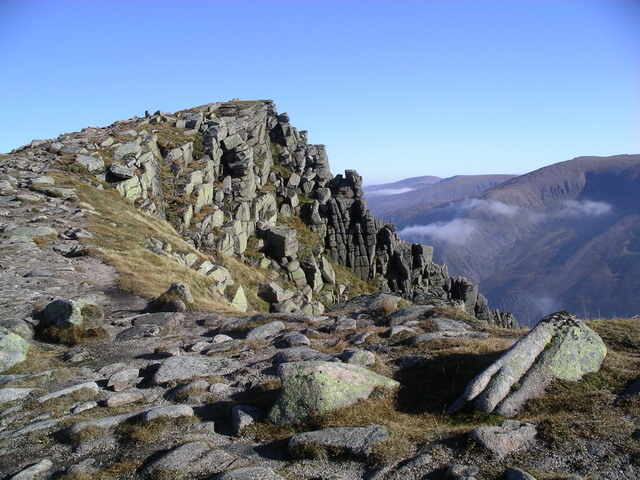
Sgor Gaoith (1,118 m (3,668 ft)). Cairn Gorm (1,245 m (4,085 ft)) can be seen to the right.

The original Gaelic name for the range is Am Monadh Ruadh (the red hills), distinguishing them from Am Monadh Liath (the grey hills), which lie to the west of the River Spey:

If you look from Aviemore on a clear evening, the granite screes of Lairig Ghru and Braeriach do glow a warm red in the sun. The name Am Monadh Ruadh still lives among the oldest folk of Strath Spey, but long ago, outsiders had replaced it with 'the Cairngorms', on maps and in guide books.

— Watson

The English language name for the range is Cairngorms, and is derived from Cairn Gorm, which is prominent in the view of the mountains from Speyside. The earliest reference to this name appears to be from a Colonel T. Thornton, who visited the area in about 1786:

The use of the term "Cairngorms" as applied to the group must have become well established early in the nineteenth century, for we find it in Col Thornton's Sporting Tour (1804), where there is a reference to "Aurora peeping over the immense Cairngorms."

— Alexander (p21)

Cairn Gorm is generally translated as Blue Cairn, although the Gaelic gorm is also used as an adjective and verb, meaning green or greening and is often seen in connection with growing grass. Thus, there is a contradiction or confusion, because the original Scottish Gaelic name of the mountains translates to English as the "red hills" whilst their English name is the "blue hills" or the "green hills".

== Geography ==
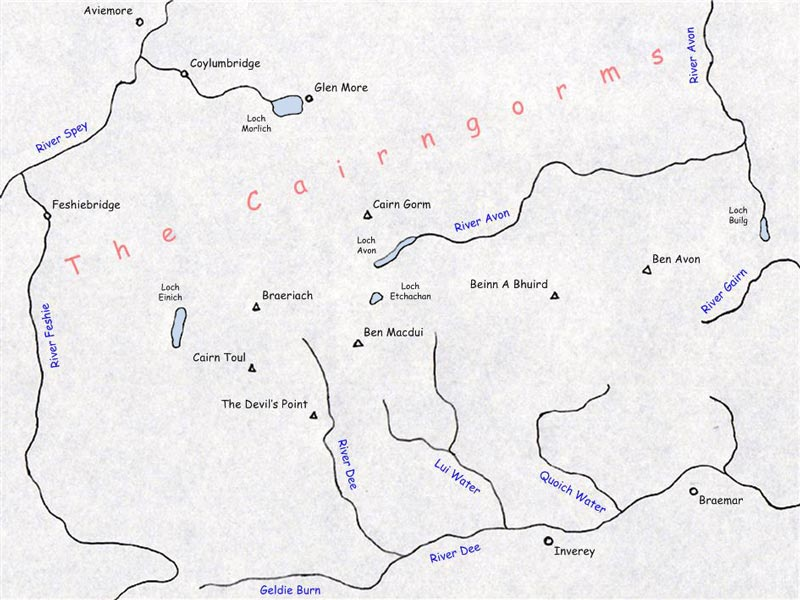
Sketch map showing villages, mountains, lochs, and rivers of The Cairngorms.

The Cairngorms consist of three large elevated plateaux adorned with low, rounded glacial mountains, and divided by the passes of the Lairig an Laoigh and the Lairig Ghru. The range gives the sense of being a single plateau, because the passes that cut through them are not very deep: the summit of Lairig an Laoigh lies at 740 m (2,430 ft), whilst the summit of the Lairig Ghru is at 835 m (2,740 ft) above sea level at the Pools of Dee, where the water may be frozen over even in mid-summer. This means a walker could cross between the Cairntoul (1,293 m (4,242 ft)) – Braeriach (1,296 m (4,252 ft)) massif to the Ben Macdui (1,309 m (4,295 ft)) – Cairn Gorm (1,245 m (4,085 ft)) massif and thence onto the Beinn a' Bhùird (1,196 m (3,924 ft)) – Ben Avon (1,171 m (3,842 ft)) massif without descending below the 740 m (2,430 ft) summit of the Lairig an Laoigh. The range is drained by the Rivers Dee and Spey; and the latter's two tributaries: the Rivers Feshie and Avon.

The approximate southern boundary of the Cairngorm range is generally reckoned to run from slightly east of Braemar, west along the Dee and Glen Geldie to the head of Glen Feshie. The western edge of the range is defined by Glen Feshie and the River Spey as far as Aviemore, with the northern boundary running roughly eastward from Aviemore through Glenmore to Glen Avon. The eastern boundary is defined by Glen Avon and the Am Bealach Dearg, thus ending slightly east of Braemar.

The Cairngorms feature the highest, coldest and snowiest plateaus in the British Isles and are home to five of the six highest mountains in Scotland:

- Ben Macdui (1,309 m (4,295 ft))
- Braeriach (1,296 m (4,252 ft))
- Cairn Toul (1,293 m (4,242 ft))
- Sgor an Lochain Uaine (1,258 m (4,127 ft))
- Cairn Gorm (1,245 m (4,085 ft))

There are no public roads through the Cairngorms, and all the public roads in the general area either skirt the Cairngorms or stop short, providing access to them only. From the south and south-east, motorised access ends at Linn of Dee, or Allanaquoich. From the north-west, a road passes Coylumbridge, Glenmore and the Sugarbowl to end at the car park at the Cairngorm Mountain ski resort. The majority of hill-walkers access the range from these road ends.

== Climate ==
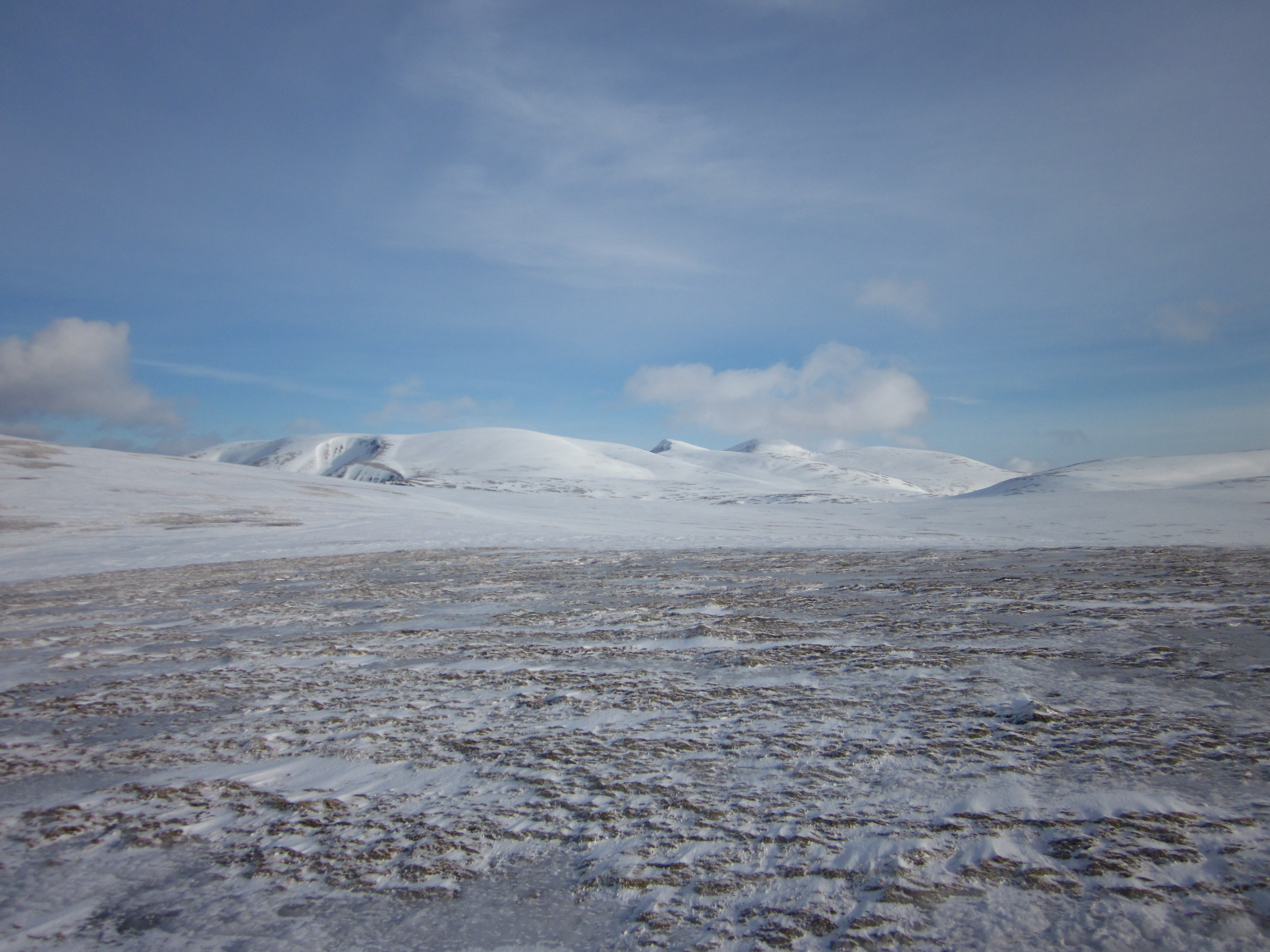
Braeriach (1,296 m (4,252 ft)), Sgor an Lochain Uaine (1,258 m (4,127 ft)) and Cairn Toul (1,293 m (4,242 ft)) from the Moine Mhor.

In terms of height, remoteness and the severe and changeable weather, the Cairngorms are the most arduous area in the United Kingdom. The plateau area has a Tundra climate (Köppen ET), and the shattered terrain is more like the high ground in high-arctic Canada or northern Norway than what is often observed in the European Alps or Rockies. The weather often deteriorates rapidly with elevation so that, when there are moderate conditions 150 m (490 ft) below the plateau, the top can be stormy or misty, and there can be icy or powdery snow. Even when no snow is falling, the wind can whip up lying snow to produce white-out conditions for a few metres above the surface, and snowdrifts can build up rapidly in sheltered places. Gravel can be blown through the air, and walking can be impossible.

When a gale is accompanied by thick storms of ground drift, or worse, by heavy falling blizzards plus ground drift, or worse still by mist as well, conditions can be extremely serious on the plateau, making it suffocating and difficult to breathe, hard to open your eyes, impossible to see anything beyond your own feet, and unable to communicate with your party except one at a time by cupping an ear and shouting into it.

— Watson

The lowest recorded temperature in the United Kingdom has twice been recorded in the Cairngorms, at Braemar, where a temperature of −27.2 °C (−17.0 °F), was recorded on 11 February 1895 and 10 January 1982. The greatest British wind speed of 176 mph (283 km/h) was measured at Cairngorm summit weather station in January 1993. (Note: The Cairngorm weather station is at 1,245 m (4,085 ft) and has been operating since 1977) The weather can be very hazardous at times, with dangerous and unpredictable conditions. What is often described as Britain's worst mountaineering tragedy, the Cairngorm Plateau Disaster, left five children and one adult dead in November 1971.

Cairn Gorm gets 320 cm (130 in) of snow annually according to snowforecast.com.

Climate data for Cairn Gorm Summit, Elevation: 1,245 m (4,085 ft), 1991–2020
Month	Jan	Feb	Mar	Apr	May	Jun	Jul	Aug	Sep	Oct	Nov	Dec	Year
Mean daily maximum °C (°F)	−1.0 (30.2)	−1.0 (30.2)	−0.1 (31.8)	2.0 (35.6)	5.2 (41.4)	7.4 (45.3)	9.6 (49.3)	9.4 (48.9)	7.5 (45.5)	4.0 (39.2)	1.3 (34.3)	−0.3 (31.5)	3.7 (38.6)
Daily mean °C (°F)	−3.1 (26.4)	−3.2 (26.2)	−2.3 (27.9)	−0.4 (31.3)	2.4 (36.3)	4.8 (40.6)	7.1 (44.8)	6.9 (44.4)	5.1 (41.2)	1.8 (35.2)	−0.9 (30.4)	−2.6 (27.3)	1.3 (34.3)
Mean daily minimum °C (°F)	−5.2 (22.6)	−5.4 (22.3)	−4.7 (23.5)	−2.8 (27.0)	−0.4 (31.3)	2.2 (36.0)	4.5 (40.1)	4.4 (39.9)	2.6 (36.7)	−0.4 (31.3)	−3.0 (26.6)	−4.8 (23.4)	−1.1 (30.1)
Average snowfall cm (inches)	57 (22)	62 (24)	49 (19)	43 (17)	17 (6.7)	3 (1.2)	trace	0 (0)	trace	9 (3.5)	36 (14)	47 (19)	323 (126.4)
Source 1: Met Office
Source 2: snowforecast.com

=== Snow patches ===
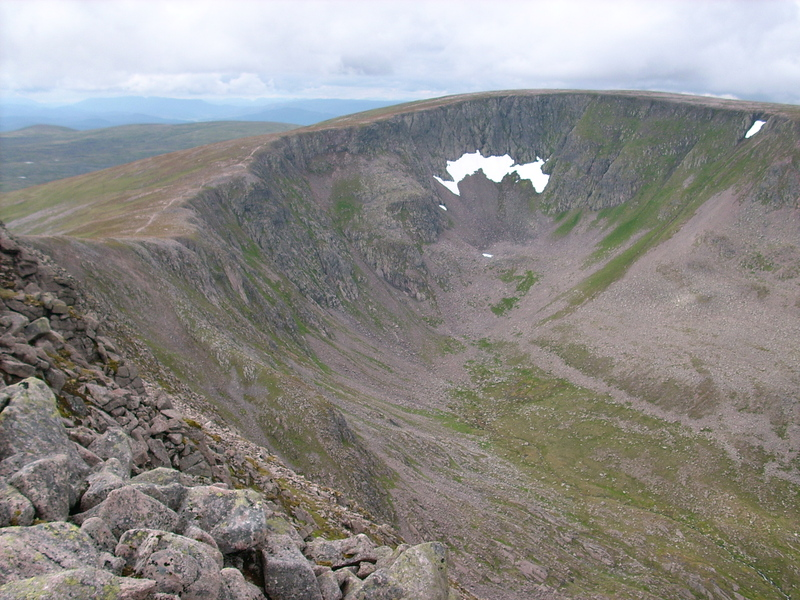
Scotland's most durable snow patch, Garbh Choire Mòr, Braeriach, 8 August 2008

The Cairngorms hold some of the longest-lying snow patches in Scotland:

- On Ben Macdui, snow has been known to persist at a few locations from one winter to the next.
- Lying at the north-eastern shoulder of Cairn Gorm is Ciste Mhearad. This hollow contains a patch which, hitherto, was known to persist through many years, but has not done so since 2000. Observations in 2007 and 2008 revealed that September was the month when final melting occurred for this patch. It sits at an elevation of 1,095 m (3,593 ft) and is located at approximately grid reference NJ011046.
- Braeriach's Garbh Choire Mòr is the location of Scotland's most persistent snow beds. Snow has been absent from this corrie just 11 times in the last century: 1933, 1959, 1996, 2003, 2006, 2017, 2018, 2021, 2022, 2023, and 2024. Situated at an elevation of about 1140 m, these patches are located around grid reference NN940980; the two most long-lasting patches are known as "the Pinnacles" and "the Sphinx" after the rock climbs lying above them. Recent studies based on moraine, avalanche debris fields and climate models suggest it is likely that Garbh Choire Mòr (as well as Coire an Lochain in the northern corries) contained glaciers as recently as the 19th century.

In 1994, the Cairngorms and surrounding mountains of north-east Scotland had 55 surviving patches, an exceptional number.

== Geology ==
The Cairngorms were formed 40 million years before the last ice age, when slight uplift raised an eroded peneplain based on an exposed granite pluton. The highest present-day peaks represent eroded monadnock hills. During the ice ages, the ice caps that covered most of northern Scotland remained static—frozen to the ground for long periods—and actually protected the rounded summits and valleys and deep, weathered granite of the mountains of the area. Glacial erosion is represented in deep valleys which dissect the area. Many valleys are littered with glacial deposits from the period of glacial retreat. The most famous valley is the Lairig Ghru pass, a gouge through the centre of the mountains—a u-shaped valley, now partly filled with extensive scree produced by intense frost action during ice-free periods. Many parts of the Cairngorms exhibit classic periglacial weathering which occurred during cold periods in ice-free areas.

Tors are a common feature of the Cairngorm granite massif, being especially frequent on Ben Avon and Beinn Mheadhoin and impressively high on Bynack More. They represent masses of granite which are less closely jointed than surrounding rock and which have therefore been less susceptible to underground weathering associated with fluid percolation along joints. The present tors have been exhumed over a long period of time, not least by periglacial processes associated with ice ages during the Quaternary period.

== Nature and conservation ==
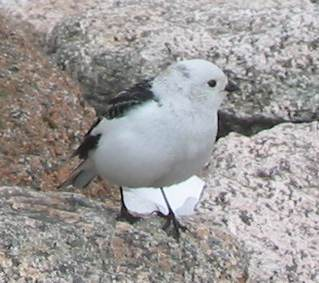
An adult male snow bunting in the Cairngorms

The Cairngorms provide a unique alpine semi-tundra moorland habitat, home to many rare plants, birds and animals. Speciality bird species on the plateaux include breeding ptarmigan, dotterel, snow bunting, golden eagle, ring ouzel and red grouse, with snowy owl, twite, purple sandpiper and Lapland bunting seen on occasion. Mammal species include red deer and mountain hare, as well as the only herd of reindeer in the British Isles.

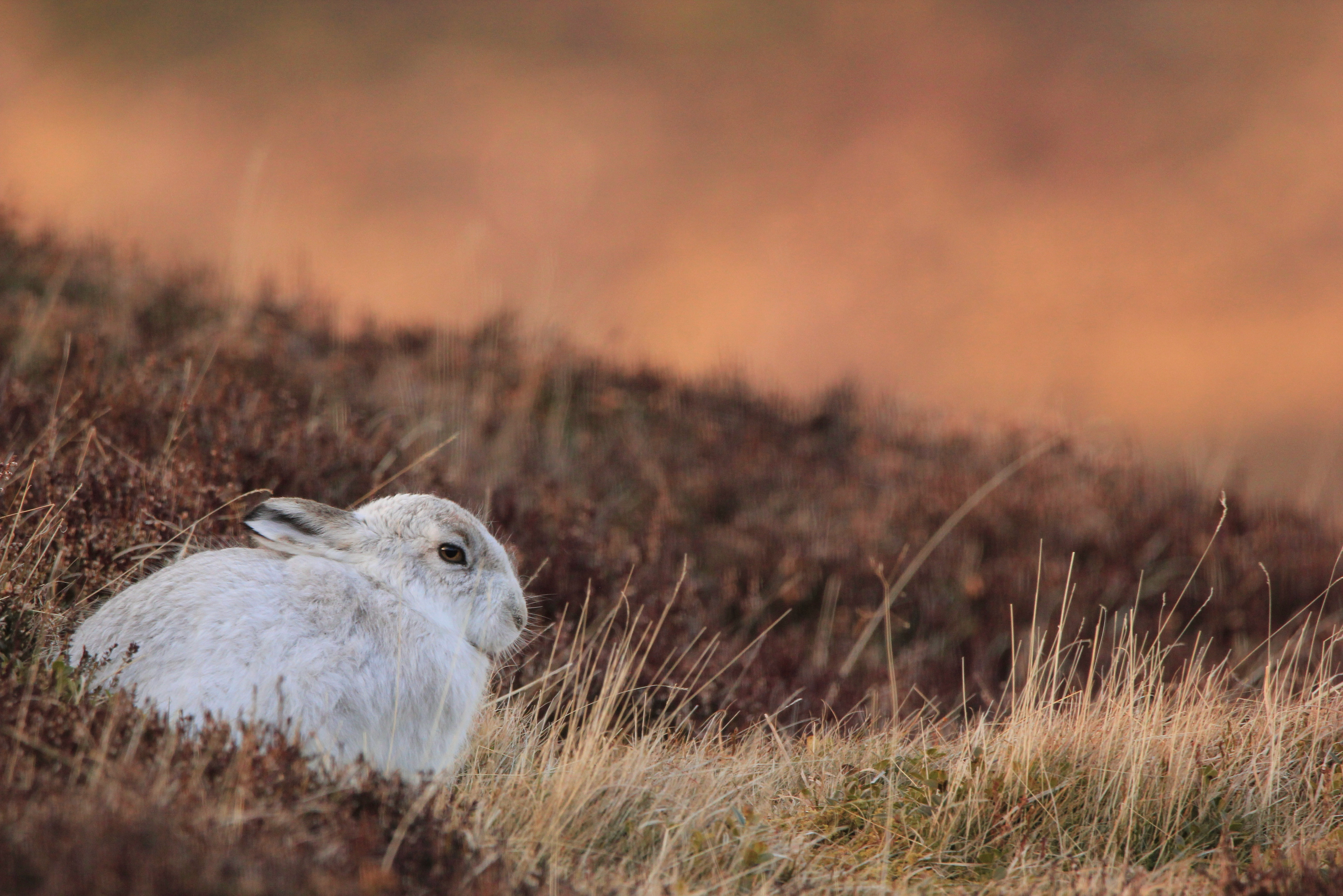
Mountain hare in the Cairngorms SAC

The reindeer now roam the high Cairngorms, after being reintroduced in 1952 by a Swedish herdsman. The herd is now stable at around 150 individuals, some born in Scotland and some introduced from Sweden; since the individuals depend on humans for food and come from domesticated stock, they are not considered wild.

The surrounding areas feature an ancient woodland, one of the last major ones of its kind in the British Isles, known as the Caledonian forest. In the forests, capercaillie, black grouse, Scottish crossbill, parrot crossbill and crested tit are found. Of particular fame is the Royal Society for the Protection of Birds (RSPB) reserve at Abernethy Forest and Loch Garten. A famous pair of ospreys are present in the summer months, and they often attract large crowds to see them. The forest is home to the endangered capercaillie and endemic Scottish crossbill.

Research into lichen communities in the Cairngorms has shown that the area hosts distinctive terricolous (ground-dwelling) lichen vegetation associated with different types of plant communities. The most diverse lichen assemblages are found in the low-montane zone (750–900 m), particularly in prostrate Calluna vulgaris heath, where fruticose macrolichens are co-dominant with vascular plants. The lichen vegetation of the Cairngorms, while significant within Britain, is best considered a species-poor outlier of Scandinavian heath communities. Three main National Vegetation Classification (NVC) communities support significant lichen vegetation in the area: Calluna vulgaris–Cladonia arbuscula heath at lower elevations, Vaccinium myrtillus–Cladonia arbuscula heath at intermediate levels, and Oreojuncus trifidus–Racomitrium lanuginosum rush heath on exposed summits. The distribution and diversity of lichens varies across the range, with the northern Cairngorms showing the greatest diversity, which decreases both eastward and westward due to changes in vascular plant and bryophyte cover.

As well being included as part of the Cairngorms National Park the Cairngorm Mountains are designated as a national scenic area, one of 40 such areas in Scotland. Apart from a small area around the Cairngorm Ski Area, the whole of the mountain area is protected as both a Special Area of Conservation and a Special Protection Area, thus forming part of the Natura 2000 network of protected sites. The Cairngorms are classified as a Category IV protected area by the International Union for Conservation of Nature.

The Cairngorms were declared a national nature reserve (NNR) in 1954, being the largest NNR in Britain. In 2006 Scottish Natural Heritage (SNH) reviewed the Cairngorms NNR, and it was decided that the reserve should be broken up into separate, smaller reserves that reflected existing management units. There now are four NNRs within the core mountain area of the Cairngorms. Mar Lodge Estate, which covers the south side of the plateau and the watershed of the upper Dee has been classified as a national nature reserve since May 2017. The Abernethy Forest National Nature Reserve covers a stretch of land from the plateau down to Loch Garten on the north side of the range, and Glenmore Forest Park, covering a remnant of the Caledonian Forest surrounding Loch Morlich, is also designated as a national nature reserve. The Invereshie and Inshriach National Nature Reserve lies on the western flanks of the range, and extends to the summit of Sgòr Gaoith.

=== Threats to the ecosystem ===
The Cairngorms represents an unusually cold area of mountains in a maritime climate at 57 degrees north. The climate is projected to warm—and precipitation patterns to change—under present climate change models. This is an over-riding concern for the long-term conservation of this area. Ptarmigan has been considered as an indicator species for this process, although the natural population cycles of this bird do not seem to have been disrupted as yet.

Other man-made threats include the problems of popularity in a country with limited wilderness resources and a large, relatively affluent urban population. These include various types of recreation and the associated trampling damage and erosion, disturbance, litter and threats to water quality.

== Human habitation and ownership ==
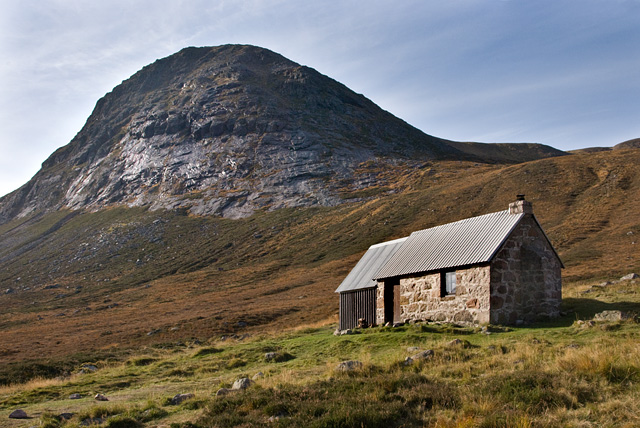
Corrour Bothy in October 2009

The valleys between the individual plateaux were used as drove roads by cattle drovers who built rough protective shelters for their arduous journeys. At about the same time that droving was dying out towards the end of the 19th century, deer stalking estates were flourishing, and so the shelters were developed into bothies to provide improved, though still primitive, accommodation for gamekeepers. In modern times, these bothies have been taken over by the Mountain Bothies Association for use by walkers and climbers to provide shelter and rough sleeping accommodation. With the exception of the bothies, there are no buildings or settlements within the Cairngorms, nor is there evidence for historic settlement, except in the uppermost reaches of the Derry and Gairn rivers. In the surrounding areas, villages such as Aviemore and Braemar provide a base for visitors to the core mountain area.

Much of the core mountain area is owned by conservation bodies, with the National Trust for Scotland owning Mar Lodge Estate, and the RSPB's Abernethy Estate stretching from the lower slopes up to the plateau. The main private landowners are the Glenavon Estate in the northeast, the Invercauld Estate in the southeast, the Glen Feshie Estate to the southwest and the Rothiemurchus Estate in the northwest.

== Leisure ==
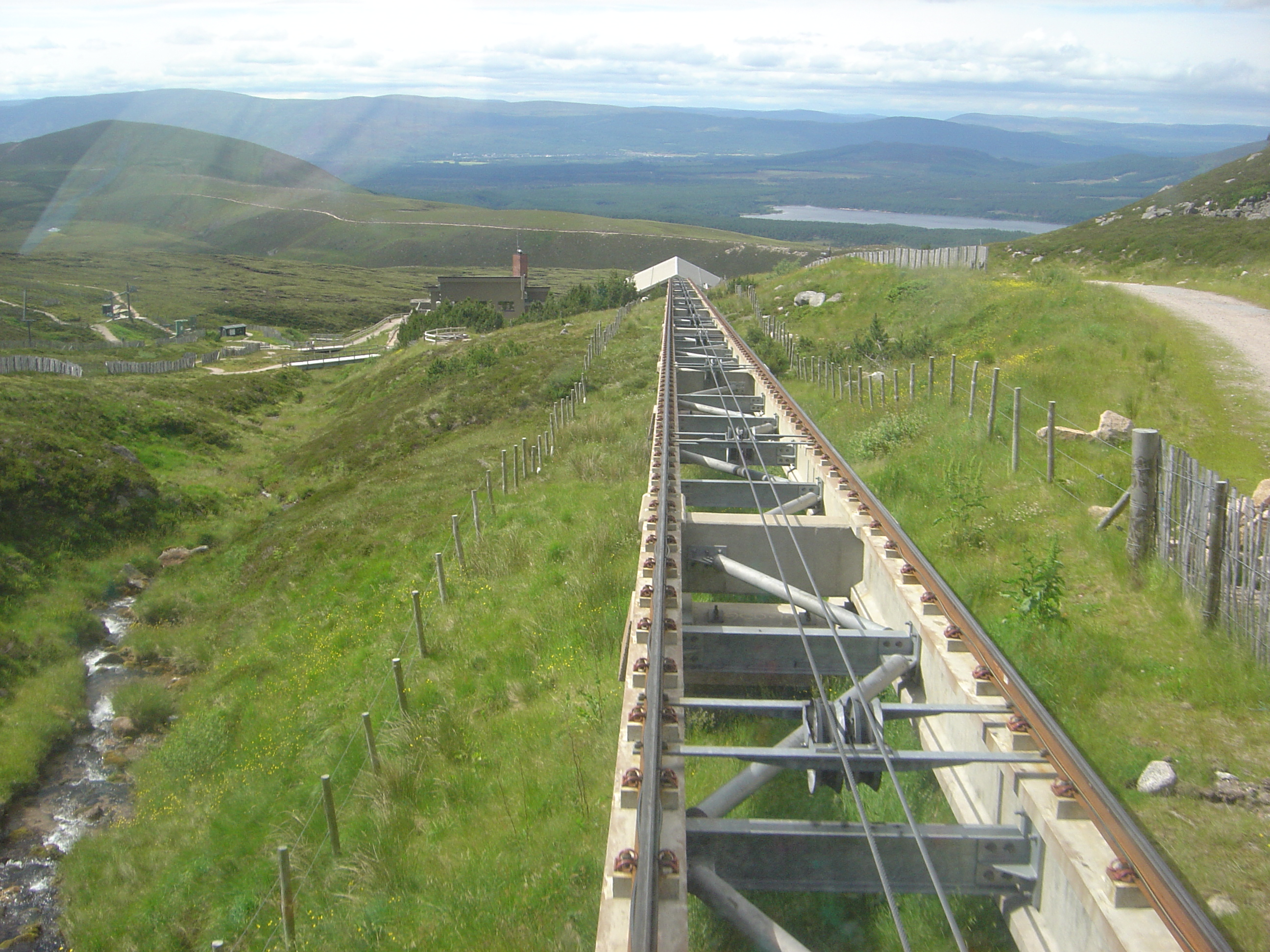
The funicular track in summer

There is a funicular railway on Cairn Gorm serving the Cairn Gorm Ski Centre. The funicular opened in late 2001, and runs from a base station at 637 m up to the Ptarmigan Centre, situated at 1097 m, 150 m from the summit of Cairn Gorm. It was built amidst some controversy, with supporters of the scheme claiming that it would bring valuable tourist income into the area, whilst opponents argued that such a development was unsuitable for a supposedly protected area. A condition was therefore imposed under which walkers were not allowed outside the top station if arriving by funicular, although this did not apply to skiers and snowboarders in the winter. In 2010 the operating company proposed to modify this requirement to allow guided walks, whilst still preventing general access. Guided walks continued to be the only way for walkers and summer visitors to access the plateau if arriving via the funicular as of 2017.

The mountains are very popular for hill-walking, with eighteen Munros lying between Ben Avon in the east and Glen Feshie in the west. In winter these summits can often be reached by ski touring. The Cairngorms have excellent climbing, and has long attracted winter climbers, especially in the northern corries. This area boasts what was for a time probably the world's hardest traditionally protected mixed climb: "The Hurting", grade XI. As with all land in Scotland, there is a right of responsible access to the mountains for those wishing to participate in recreational pursuits, although the restriction on access via the funicular means walkers and climbers cannot use the railway to access the hills.

Angling for trout and salmon is popular in the lochs and rivers that surround the mountains, and Loch Avon in the very heart of the range is noted for its Arctic charr. Other popular activities include birdwatching and wildlife watching, whilst the Cairngorm Gliding Club (based in Glen Feshie) offers the opportunity for gliding.

== Gallery ==
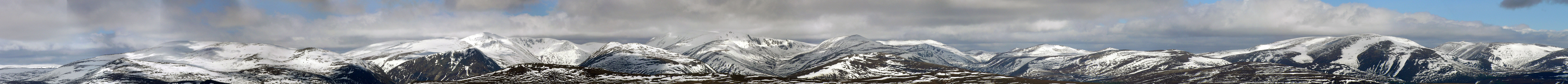
The Cairngorms from Càrn Liath to the south
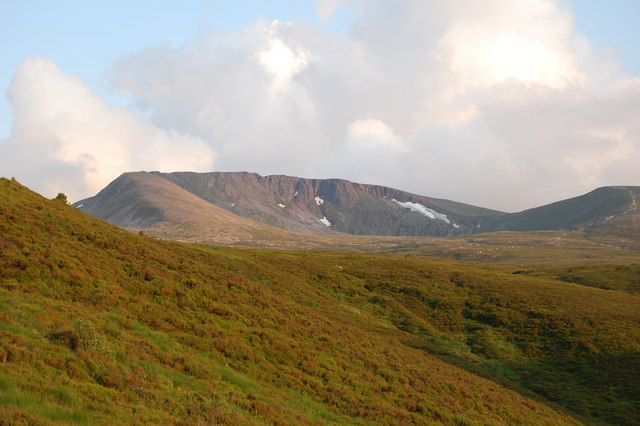
Cairn Lochan (1,215 m (3,986 ft)).

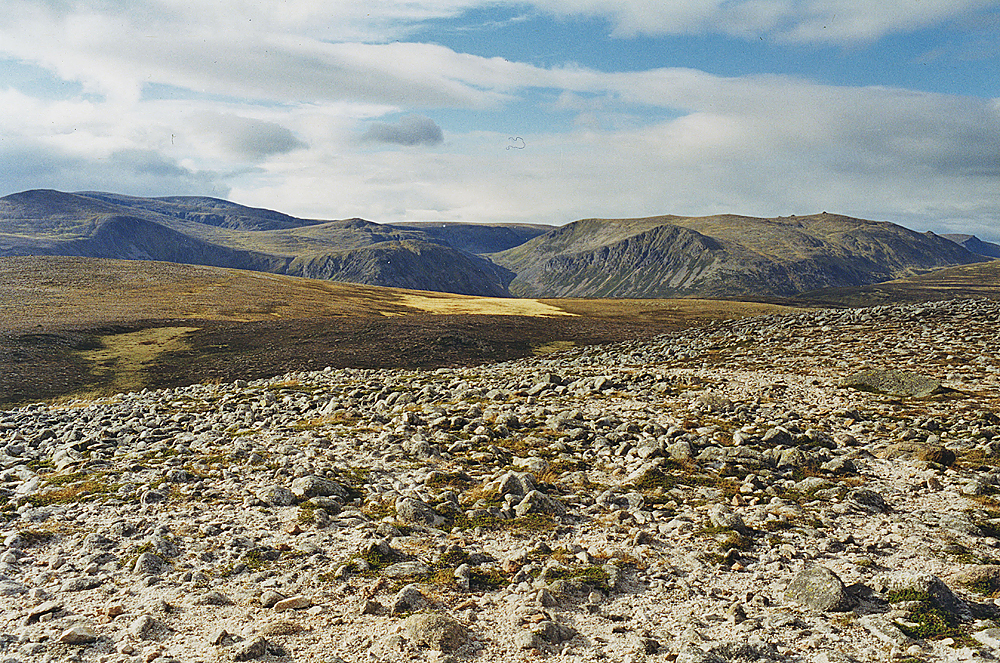
View north-west from the summit of Beinn Bhreac (931 m (3,054 ft)).

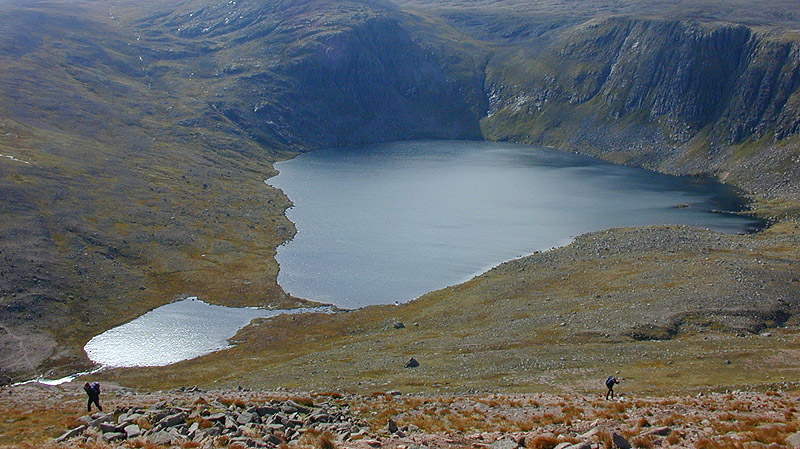
Loch Etchachan.

== See also ==
- Ben Nevis
- Cairn Gorm
- Cairngorms National Park
- Caledonian Forest
- List of Munro mountains
- Mountains and hills of Scotland
