= Càrn a' Mhàim =

Mountain in Scotland

Coordinates: 57.0364°N 3.6574°W

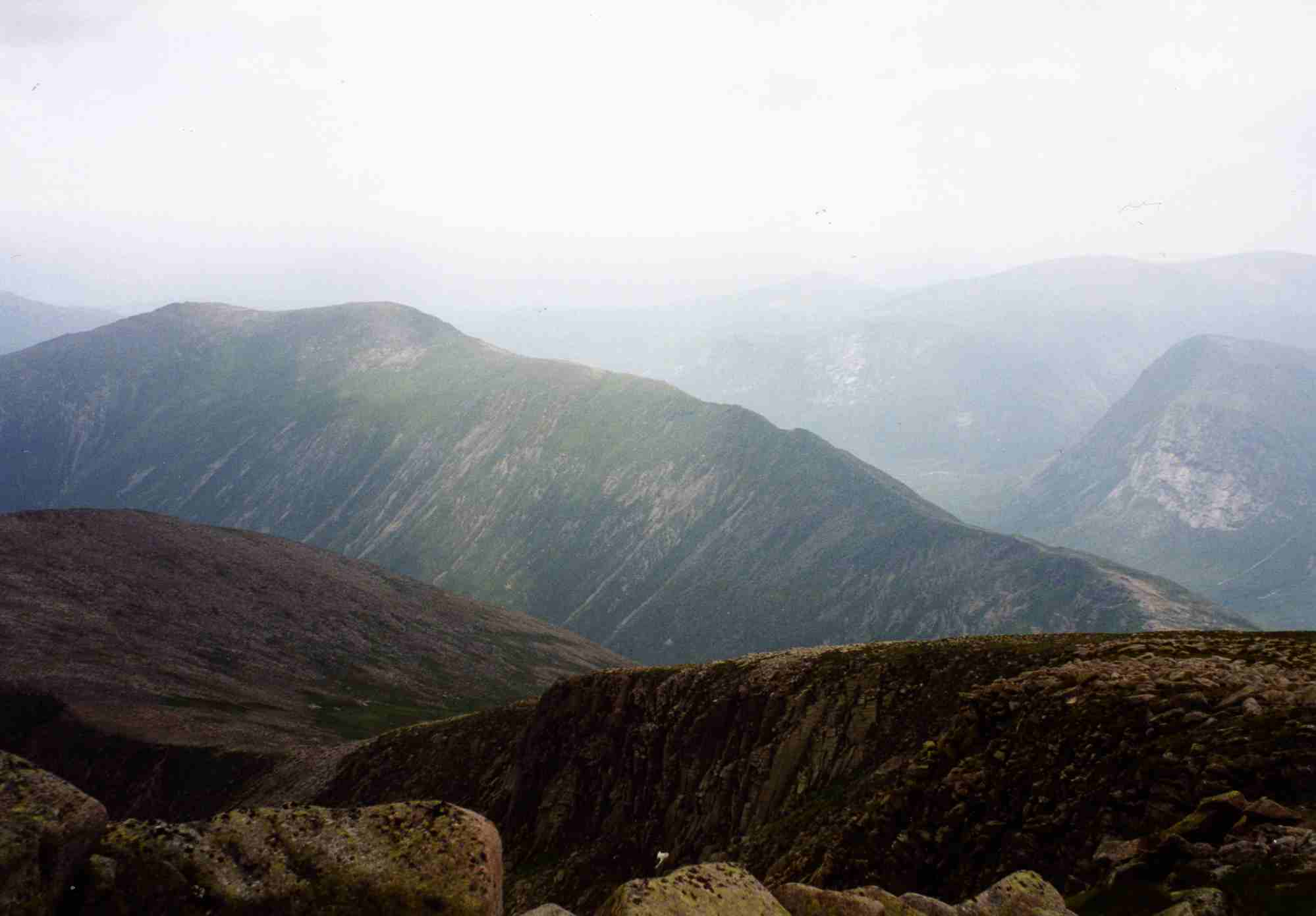
- Càrn a' Mhàim from Ben Macdhui.

Highest point
- Elevation: 1,037 m (3,402 ft)
- Prominence: c. 231 m
- Parent peak: Ben Macdui
- Listing: Munro, Marilyn

Naming
- English translation: Cairn of the large rounded hill / Hill of the Pass
- Language of name: Gaelic
- Pronunciation: Scottish Gaelic: [ˈkʰaːrˠn ə ˈvãːjm]

Geography
- Location: Cairngorms, Scotland
- Parent range: Grampians
- OS grid: NN994952
- Topo map: OS Landranger 43,36 OS Explorers 403

Càrn a' Mhàim is a Scottish mountain situated in the inner part of the Cairngorms range, some 15 kilometres west of Braemar in the county of Aberdeenshire.

== Overview ==
The mountain is located on one of the two long ridges which radiate south from Ben Macdhui; it reaches a height of 1037 metres (3402 feet) and along with Macdhui and Derry Cairngorm forms the central body of the Cairngorms that lie between the two major passes of the Lairig Ghru and the Lairig an Laoigh. The mountain is notable in that it has the only ridge walk of any significance in the Cairngorms range. Its name translates from the Gaelic as "Cairn of the large rounded hill", when viewed from the south it does appear as rounded, although in reality the mountain is a north-south oriented ridge. Another possible meaning of the name is "Hill of the Pass" derived from mam or mhaim, meaning pass. The mountain stands at the entrance of the Lairig Ghru pass, so this meaning is a possibility.

== Geography ==
Càrn a' Mhàim's slopes fall away steeply from the summit in three directions. The western flanks fall precipitously to the Lairig Ghru while the eastern slopes descent more gently to the valley of the Luibeg Burn. To the south east there is a broad ridge which ends in the crags of Coire na Poite. To the north is a narrow two kilometre-long crest which is often labelled as the only noteworthy ridge in the Cairngorms; it connects the mountain to Ben Macdhui.

The journey to Ben Macdhui is a hard walk which goes along Càrn a' Mhàim's northern ridge with Irvine Butterfield saying:

"The ridge linking Carn a' Mhaim to Ben Macdhui is the only one of its kind in the Cairngorms, an exhilarating arête commanding a fine prospect of The Devil's Point and Cairn Toul".

It drops down to the col between the two mountains at a height of around 800 metres. From there it is a hard climb of 500 metres up the side of the Allt Clach nan Tàillear (The Tailor's Burn) with much boulder-hopping to reach the summit plateau of Macdhui.

== Ascents ==
The ascent of Càrn a' Mhàim is most commonly started at the Linn of Dee car park (NO065901), and takes the track to Derry Lodge. A bicycle can be used on this section of the route. The path is followed for a further 2.5 kilometres past the lodge until the Robbers Copse is reached at the foot of Glen Luibeg. From here the steep southern slope of Càrn a' Mhàim are ascended to the summit. The summit of Càrn a' Mhàim gives good views of the imposing hills at the heart of the Cairngorms.

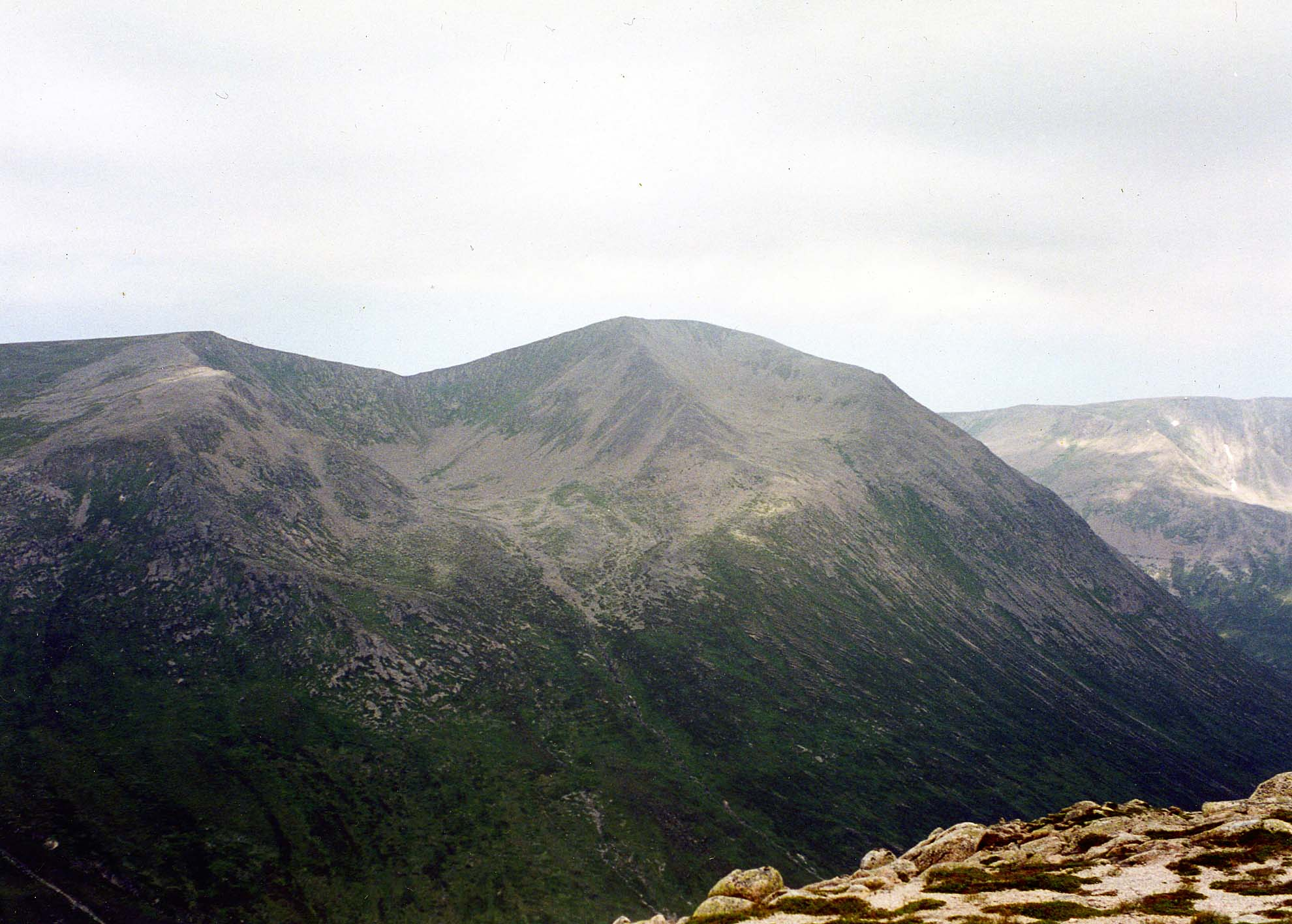
Cairn Toul seen from the summit of Carn a’ Mhaim.
