= Coire an t-Sneachda =

Glacial cirque in Highland, Scotland

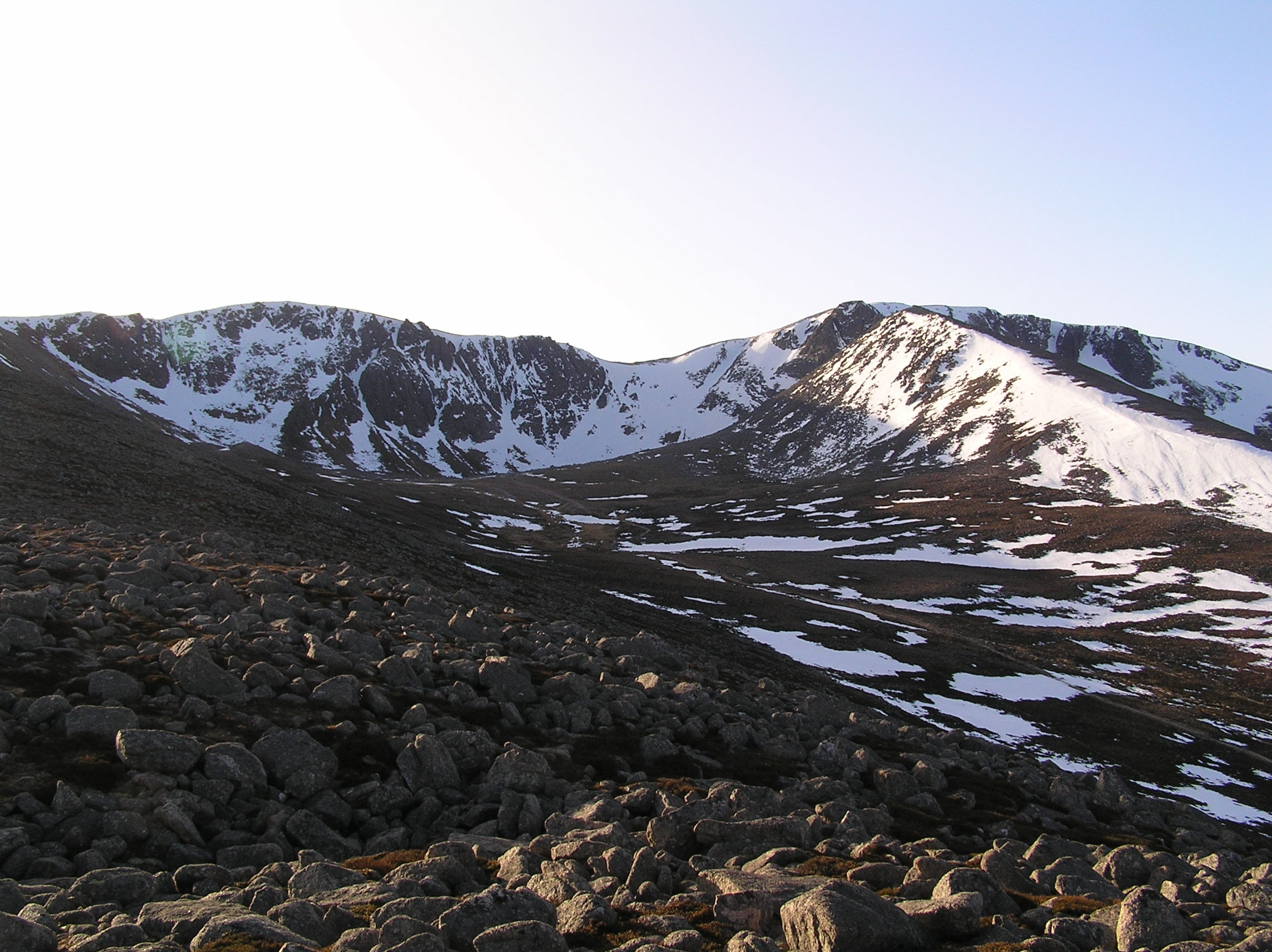
- Coire an t-Sneachda

Highest point
- Coordinates: 57.1132°N 3.6640°W

Naming
- English translation: Corrie of the Snow
- Language of name: Scottish Gaelic
- Pronunciation: Scottish Gaelic: [ˈkʰɔɾʲ ən̪ˠ ˈt̪ɾɛ̃xkə]

Geography
- Location: Inverness-shire, Scotland
- Parent range: Grampian Mountains

Coire an t-Sneachda (sometimes misspelled as Coire an t'Sneachda) is a glacial cirque or corrie landform in the Cairngorm or Am Monadh Ruadh mountain range in the Grampian Mountains of the Scottish Highlands.

The summits of Cairn Lochan (1215 m) and Stob Coire an t-Sneachda (1176 m) lie above Coire an t-Sneachda's headwall.

The Scottish Gaelic Coire an t-Sneachda translates into English as Corrie of the Snow.

== Location and access ==
Coire an t-Sneachda is located in Inverness-shire, Northern Scotland. The nearest major town is Aviemore. The nearest road access point is the Cairn Gorm ski centre, which is located approximately four kilometres (2 1/2 mi) away (approx. 45–60 minutes walking, in fair conditions).

== Geology and wildlife ==
The country rock is the Caledonian granite of the Cairngorm batholith which gives rise to the high plateau from which the corrie was eroded. The last glacier occupied this corrie or cirque approximately 10,000 to 11,000 years before present during the Younger Dryas stadial. This cold period, which is also known as the Loch Lomond stadial, was the last mini ice-age that brought glaciers and tundra conditions to the Scottish Highlands.

The corrie is home to a number of bird species, including ring ouzel and snow bunting (in the spring and summer) and ptarmigan (also known as rock ptarmigan) (all year round).

== Climbing ==
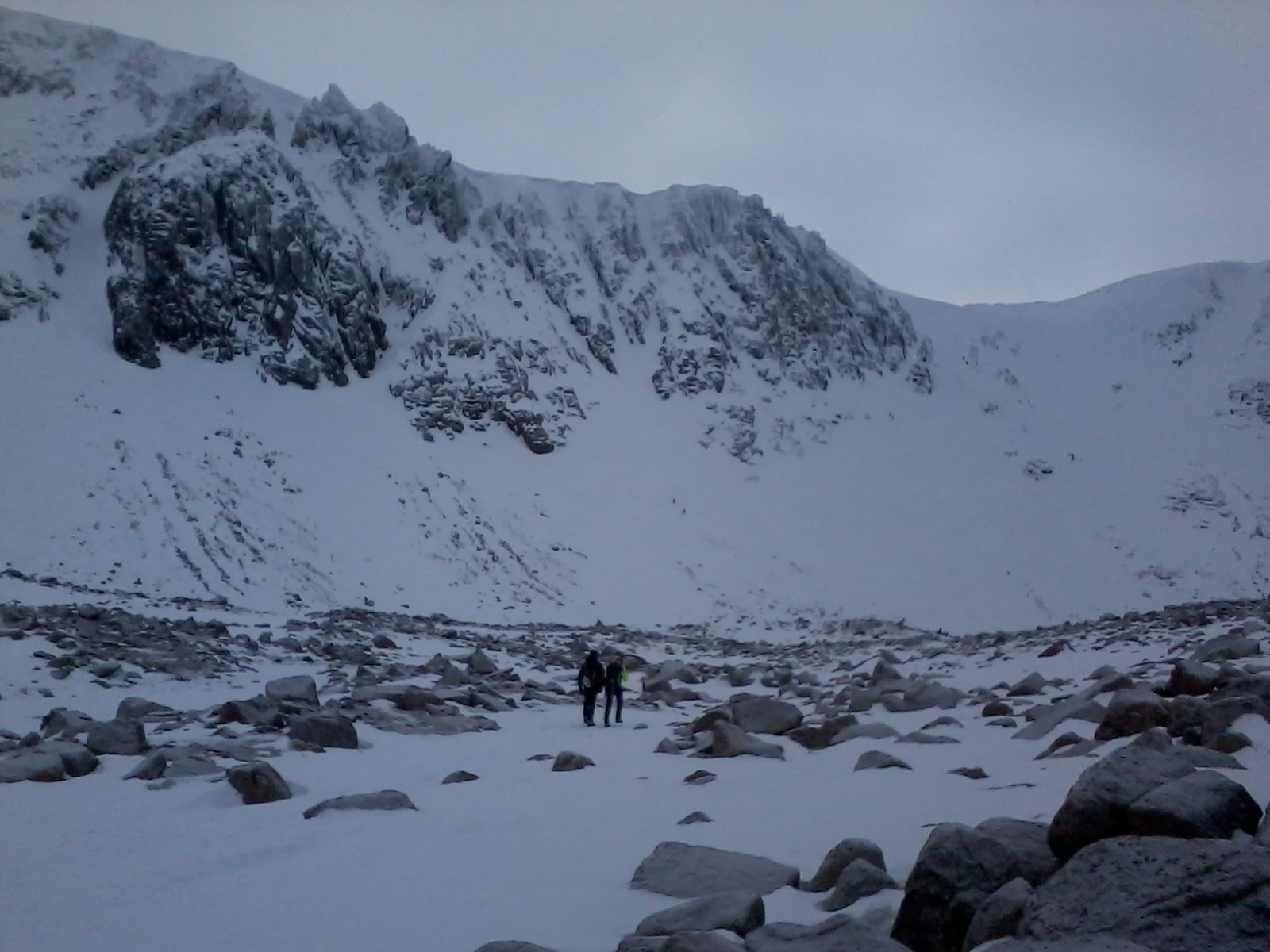
The darker mass to the left is Aladdin's buttress; to the right is Fluted Buttress; the goat track comes down from the snow col on the right.

The corrie is a popular destination for climbers, primarily because of its easy accessibility from the Cairn Gorm ski centre and the relatively reliable snow and ice conditions throughout the winter season.

A number of climbers have been killed in the corrie, attracting some media attention. Most notoriously, in the winter of 2007 five climbers died after falls or from exposure in adverse conditions during a two-month period. A member of the Cairngorms Mountain Rescue Team told BBC Scotland "it may [be] down to a combination of factors such as how easily accessible the corrie is – it is about an hour's walk from the ski centre car park – people not having adequate equipment and poor climbing conditions".
