= Coylumbridge =

Coordinates: 57.1749°N 3.794°W

Coylumbridge: Scottish Gaelic: Drochaid na Cuingleum
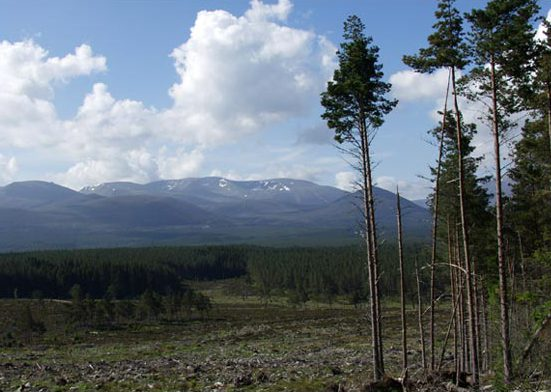
- View from Coylumbridge.

- Location within the Badenoch and Strathspey area
- OS grid reference: NH915107
- Council area: Highland
- Country: Scotland
- Sovereign state: United Kingdom
- Post town: Aviemore
- Postcode district: PH22 1
- Police: Scotland
- Fire: Scottish
- Ambulance: Scottish

Coylumbridge (Scottish Gaelic Drochaid na Cuingleum) is a small rural newly built hamlet, that lies six miles (9.7 km) northeast of Dalnavert, Highland, and three miles (4.8 km) southeast of Aviemore, in the valley of the River Spey, in the west Cairngorms National Park, in Badenoch and Strathspey, Inverness-shire, Scottish Highlands and is in the Scottish council area of Highland.
