= Cairngorm Mountain Railway =

Architectural structure in Highland, Scotland

Coordinates: 57.1274°N 3.6598°W

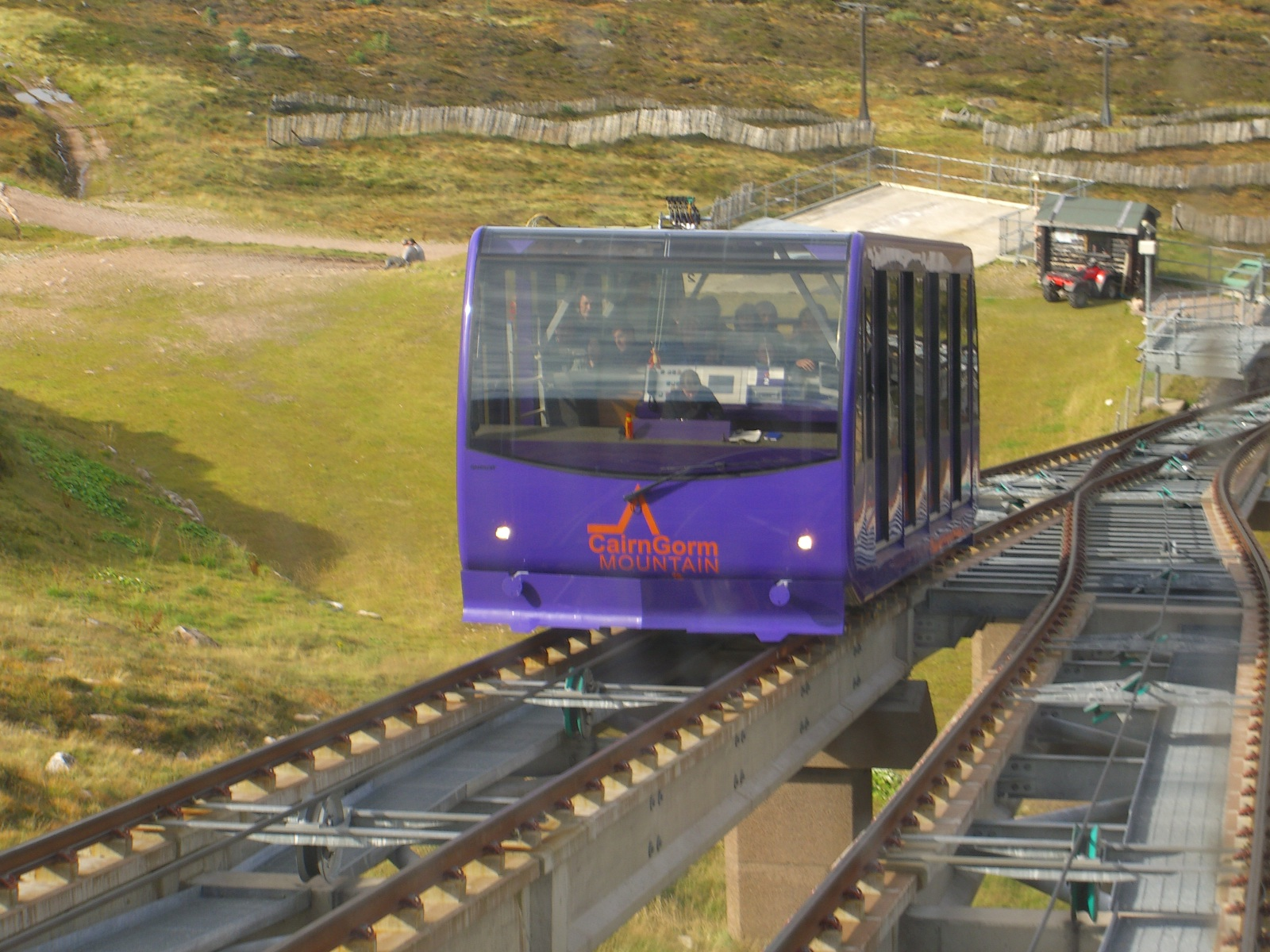
- The passing loop, above Sheiling

Overview
- Status: Open
- Owner: Highlands and Islands Enterprise
- Locale: Highland, Scotland
- Stations: 3

Service
- Type: Funicular
- Operator(s): Cairngorm Mountain Limited (2001–2014), Natural Retreats (2014–2018), Cairngorm Mountain (Scotland) Limited (2018- )

History
- Opened: 2001

Technical
- Line length: 1,970 m (6,460 ft)
- Num of tracks: Single (with passing loop)
- Track gauge: 2,000 mm (6 ft 6 3/4 in)
- Operating speed: 36 km/h (22 mph)

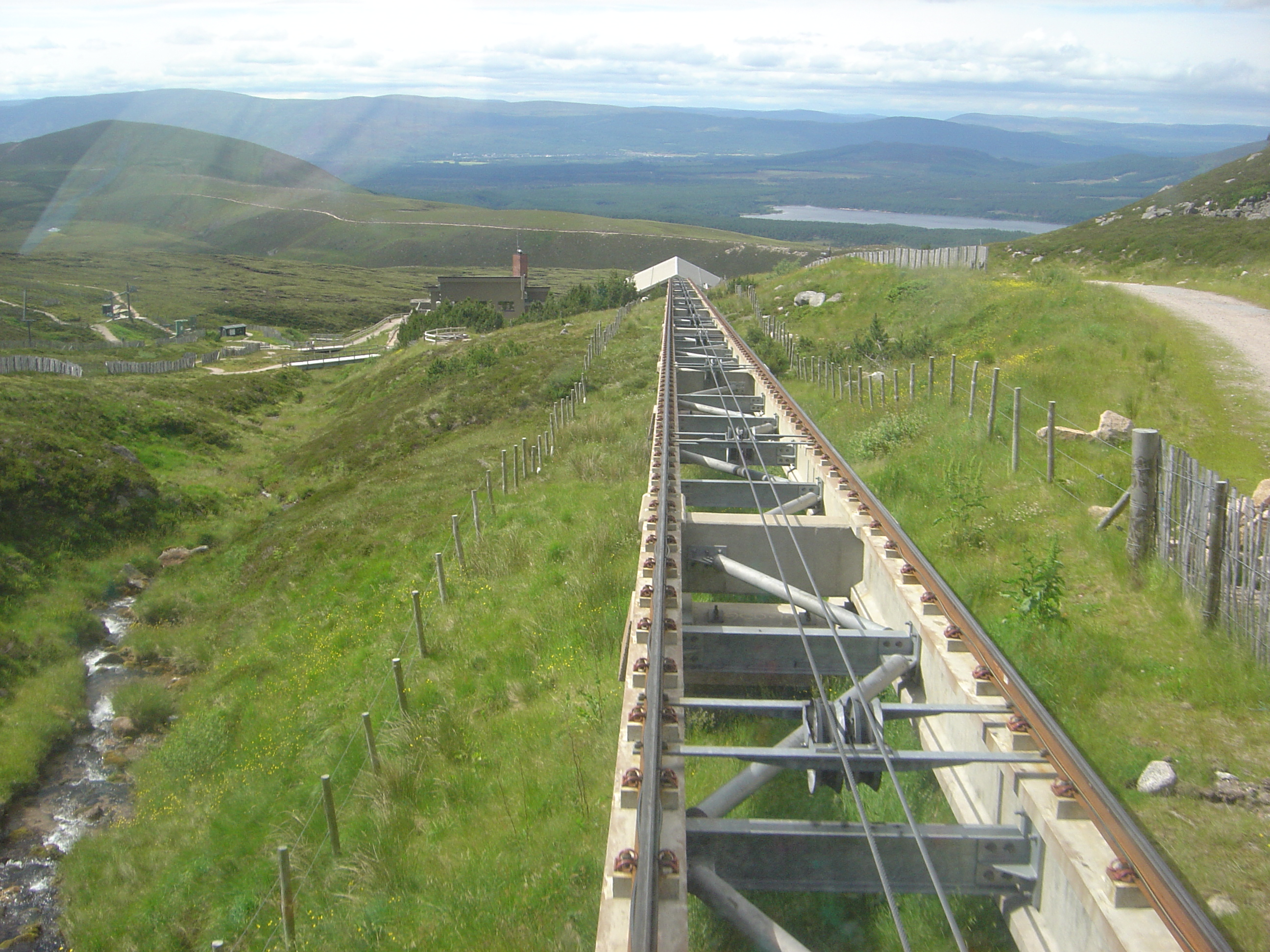
Further up the track

The Cairngorm Mountain Railway, which opened in 2001, is the highest railway in the United Kingdom. The two-kilometre long funicular ascends the northern slopes of Cairn Gorm, the United Kingdom's sixth-highest mountain, serving the Cairngorm Mountain ski resort. The route and ski area are located within the Cairngorms National Park, the largest National Nature Reserve in Britain, located near Aviemore in the Highland area of Scotland. It is a Doppelmayr 120-SSB funicular railway.

It is owned by the Highlands and Islands Enterprise and was operated by Cairngorm Mountain Limited until July 2014, when Natural Retreats UK took over the lease. Since 2018, it has been run by Cairngorm Mountain (Scotland) Limited.

The railway has been beset by structural issues, first being closed in October 2018 due to cracking concrete. It reopened in January 2023, then shut down again in August 2023, reopened on 27 February 2025, shut down a third time on 12 May 2025 before being reopened again on 2 June 2025. In Autumn 2025 it shut for a further two short periods (21-23 September and 3-9 November) for additional work.

== History ==
=== Construction ===
Construction of the Cairngorm Mountain Railway started in 1999 and it opened on 24 December 2001 (forty years after the opening of the White Lady Chairlift, which it replaced). The construction was initiated because the chairlift was too sensitive to the strong winds in the area. The track is a broad gauge of 2,000 mm (6 ft 6 3/4 in). The maximum operating speed is 10 m/s (36 km/h; 22 mph) during the ski season and 5 m/s (18 km/h; 11 mph) the rest of the year. At these speeds, the trip takes about four minutes in winter and nine minutes during the summer (calculated without middle station stops). The single track line has a passing loop just above the middle station. During ascent, the maximum gradient is 23° (1 in 2.5, or 40-per cent inclination). The railway starts at the Base Station in the Coire Cas area, where there is a restaurant, shop, ticket office, hire shop, rangers' office and Disability Sport UK office. The Scottish Ski Club has a building close to the middle station.

At peak times there can be 150,000–160,000 non-winter sports visitors, combined with a further 50,000–120,000 annual sports visitors during the winter. CML can expect to cater to 1,000 visitors per day in the summer months.

The railway is 13 km (8 mi) from Aviemore and can be reached travelling along the B970 and C38 roads to Glenmore. From Glenmore, a route is taken through the snow gates and via a one-way system past Coire na Ciste for approximately 3 km (1.9 mi). The Base Station is at an altitude of approximately 635 m (2,083 ft) above sea level, the middle station is at approximately 765 m (2,510 ft) and the top Ptarmigan Station is at approximately 1,097 m (3,599 ft).

The total length of the funicular railway track is 1,970 m (6,460 ft), during which the route rises by 462 m (1,516 ft). Most of the route is single track, with a short passing loop near half way. Up to 120 standing passengers can be carried in each of the system's two carriages. The train is fully accessible for wheelchair users and both the Base Station and Ptarmigan Station have lift access to all levels.

Depending on wind direction, wind speed trend and weather forecast, the trains can operate in winds of 100 to 120 km/h (60 to 75 mph). As the train approaches the top station it enters a 250 m (820 ft) long cut-and-cover tunnel taking it up to the top platform hidden in the hillside.

The funicular railway operates by 'hauling' up one carriage using electric motors to pull the haul rope as the other carriage descends at the same time. The system is powered by two stationary in series 500 kW electric motors, a gear box and a 'soft start-soft stop' control system which can increase the electrical frequency and vary the current and voltage to control the carriage speeds as they approach or leave a station. A hydraulically operated 'counter' rope is connected to both carriages to maintain haul rope tension. The two carriages are permanently connected by the haul rope and the counter rope and can never operate independently.

The funicular railway system is normally operated from a staffed control room within the Ptarmigan building, but can also be operated from the Base station control room or from each railway carriage. There are dedicated sophisticated computer control, instrumentation, communication and safety systems for the railway which have a range of back up systems and there are also standby generators and manual back up systems for moving the carriages.

During the ski season, skiers are asked to stay within the designated ski area and climbers and hill walkers are not allowed to use the railway to travel uphill. The railway operators have agreed, in conjunction with NaturScot, to operate a formal visitor management plan to protect fragile areas of the mountain environment. This means that for conservation reasons, the public is not allowed to access the mountains during the summer season from Ptarmigan building. These restrictions have been criticised as being incompatible with the Land Reform (Scotland) Act 2003. However, walkers who have climbed the hill themselves may purchase a downhill ticket at the Ptarmigan building for travelling back down to Base. There are no middle station stops or exits during the summer.

On 29 November 2018, it was announced that the railway had been placed into administration. Blair Milne, one of the administrators, cited that the company had become "unsustainably loss-making" after an extended closure in October 2018. Natural Retreats, the previous owners since 2013, released a press statement saying the firm still had "potential". That hope did not come to fruition and the company owed £2m.

=== Closure ===
The closure of the Cairngorm Mountain Railway funicular was due to "health and safety concerns" and "structural problems" according to reports in summer 2019. At the time, an engineering investigation was still underway to determine whether modifications would be "achievable and affordable", according to its then-owner, the Scottish government's Highlands and Islands Enterprise which also owns Cairngorm Mountain ski centre. The final findings of the consultants, SE Group, were released in July 2019, but a decision on how to proceed had not yet been made at that time.

=== Reinstatement and closure ===
On 14 October 2020, the Scottish Government announced more than £16m would be spent on the reinstatement of the funicular railway as part of a £20m project. The programme of engineering works commenced in early November 2020. The works were completed late in 2022 and the railway resumed on 26 January 2023. It was closed again on 25 August 2023, when scarf joints installed during the remedial works were found to be out of tolerance. Despite Highlands and Islands Enterprise saying on 4 December 2024 that they expected it to open at the end of December, the railway did not open to the public again until 27 February 2025, before shutting again less than three months later, from 12 May 2025 to 2 June 2025, for three weeks maintenance work which included work on the concrete viaduct. In Autumn 2025 it shut for a further two short periods (21-23 September and 3-9 November) to complete work to "enhance the long-term durability of the viaduct.".

The Scottish Parliament’s Public Audit Committee raised concerns in February 2026 about whether the economic benefits of the funicular could be outweighed by the costs to maintain it. The report noted the funicular's high repair costs, "troubled history", and lack of transparency in its governance structure.

== See also ==
- List of funicular railways
