= Cairn Gorm =

Mountain in the Cairngorms range in the Scottish Highlands

Coordinates: 57.1171°N 3.6423°W

- An Càrn Gorm
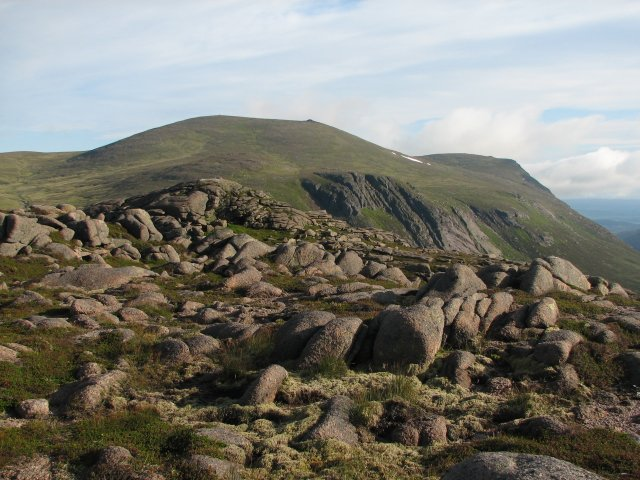
- Cairn Gorm from Stacan Dubha to the south

Highest point
- Elevation: 1,245 metres (4,085 ft)
- Prominence: 146 m (479 ft)
- Parent peak: Ben Macdui
- Isolation: 4.4 km (2.7 miles)
- Listing: Munro

Naming
- English translation: the blue cairn or the green cairn
- Language of name: Scottish Gaelic
- Pronunciation: Scottish Gaelic: [əŋ ˈkʰaːrˠn̪ˠ ˈkɔɾɔm]

Geography
- Location: Cairngorms, Scotland
- OS grid: NJ005040
- Topo map: OS Landranger 36

Climbing
- Easiest route: Hike

Listed summits of Cairn Gorm
Name	Grid ref	Height	Status
Cairn Lochan	NH985025	3,986 ft (1,215 m)	Munro Top
Stob Coire an t-Sneachda	NH996029	3,858 ft (1,176 m)	Munro Top
Cnap Coire na Spreidhe	NJ013049	3,773 ft (1,150 m)	Munro Top
Creag an Leth-choin	NH968033	3,455 ft (1,053 m)	Munro Top

Cairn Gorm (Scottish Gaelic: An Càrn Gorm) is a mountain in the Scottish Highlands. It is part of the Cairngorms range and wider Grampian Mountains. With a summit elevation of 1,245 m (4,085 ft) above sea level, Cairn Gorm is classed as a Munro and is the sixth-highest mountain in the British Isles. The high, broad domed summit overlooking Strathspey is one of the most readily identifiable mountains from the nearby town and regional centre of Aviemore. Although it shares its name with the Cairngorm mountains, Ben Macdui is the highest mountain in the range.

The highest official wind speed in the UK was in 1986 when a 173 mph (278 km/h) gust was recorded at Cairn Gorm.

Since the 1960s over 600 hectares (1,500 acres) of the north-western slopes of the mountain in Coire Cas and Coire na Ciste have been developed for alpine skiing. The ski lift infrastructure includes a funicular railway in Coire Cas. The corrie south of Coire Cas, Coire an t-Sneachda, is separated from the ski area by a ridge known as Fiacaill a' Choire Chais. The southern slopes of Cairn Gorm overlook the remote Loch Avon (pronounced Loch A'an).

== Etymology ==
The mountain shares its name with the wider Cairngorms mountain range and the Cairngorms National Park of which it is a part. Despite this it is neither the highest nor the most prominent mountain in the range. The Cairngorms mountain range was historically known as Am Monadh Ruadh, a Scottish Gaelic name meaning The Red Hills. In English, The Scottish Gaelic Gorm means "blue" or "green/greening" depending on context; so Cairn Gorm could mean Blue Cairn if describing the blue tint of the mountains as seen from a distance or Green Cairn when describing the vegetation on the hillsides; or more prosaically, just "bluish-green".

== Climate ==
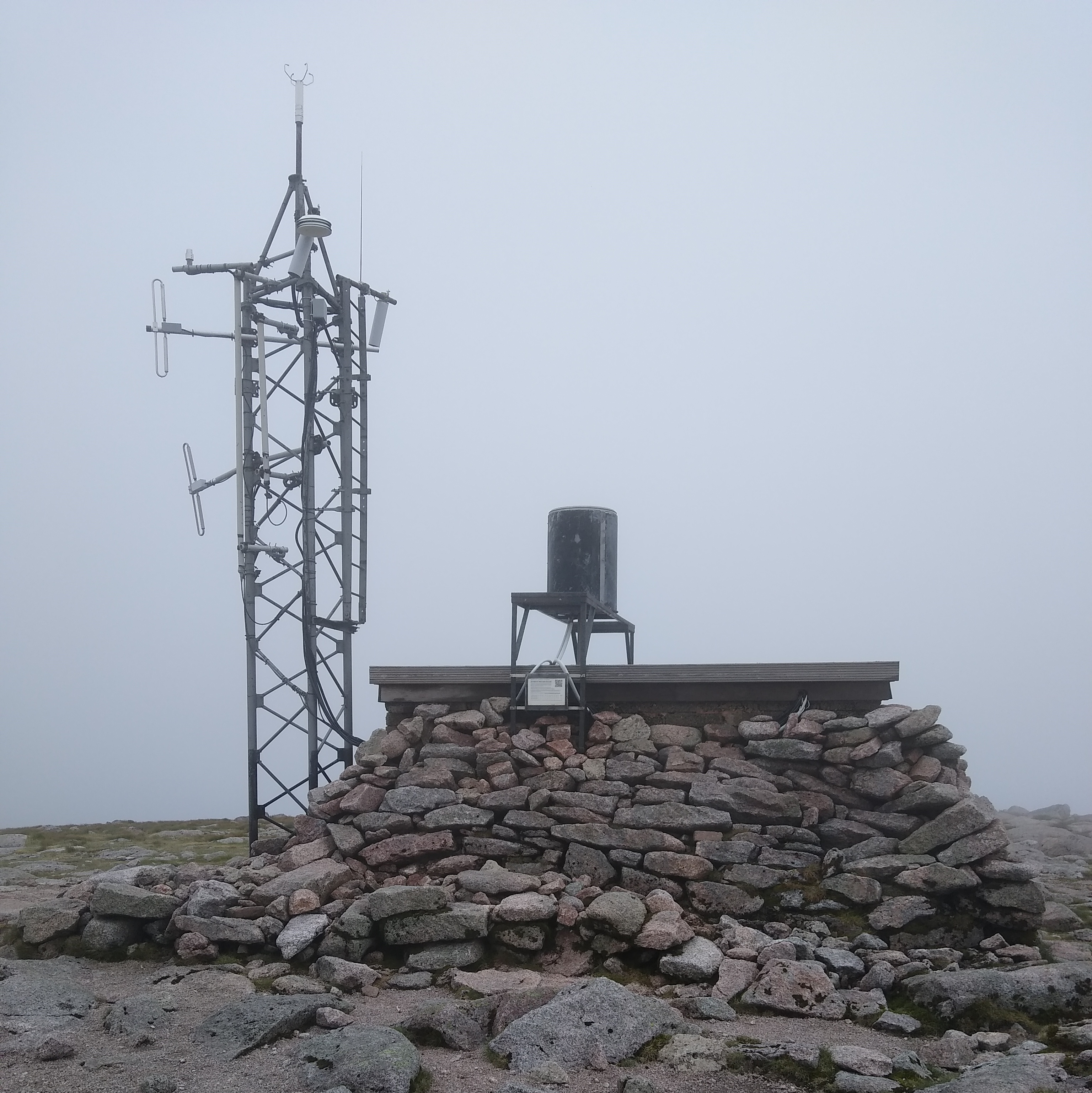
The automated weather station on Cairn Gorm

Cairn Gorm has a tundra climate (Köppen ET). There is an automated weather station (AWS) controlled by Heriot-Watt University on the summit of the mountain providing temperature and wind speed data. There is also a separate AWS run by the Met Office (synop code 03065) that publishes temperature and frost data. Cairn Gorm averages 212.8 frost days per annum, making it the coldest weather station in the United Kingdom. Winter low temperatures are not extreme when compared with some other UK stations, but the severity of the climate is illustrated by its cool summers.

The highest temperature since 1985 is 25.5 °C (77.9 °F), recorded on 23 May 1989. The coldest temperature is −26.9 °C (−16.4 °F) on 6 March 2007. Daytime temperatures staying below 0 °C (32 °F) all day occur most frequently between October and May but have been observed during every month of the year. Daytime maximum temperatures below −10 °C (14 °F) and night-time temperature above 15 °C (59 °F) are uncommon. The lowest daytime maximum was −12.7 °C (9.1 °F) on 28 February 2018. The Foehn wind can affect the mountain, particularly during late autumn and winter. This phenomenon presumably resulted in the November record high.

The warmest month on record is July 2006, with a mean temperature of 9.9 °C (49.8 °F). Conversely, the coldest month on record is March 2013, with a mean temperature of −6.7 °C (19.9 °F).

Cairn Gorm is notable for having the highest official recorded wind speed in the UK on land. A wind gust of 173 mph (278 km/h) was recorded on 20 March 1986. A wind gust of 194 mph (312 km/h) was recorded at Cairn Gorm on 19 December 2008 but was discovered too late to be verified by the Met Office.

Climate data for Cairn Gorm Summit, Elevation: 1,245 m (4,085 ft), 1991–2020
Month	Jan	Feb	Mar	Apr	May	Jun	Jul	Aug	Sep	Oct	Nov	Dec	Year
Mean daily maximum °C (°F)	−0.9 (30.4)	−0.9 (30.4)	−0.1 (31.8)	2.0 (35.6)	5.2 (41.4)	7.4 (45.3)	9.6 (49.3)	9.4 (48.9)	7.5 (45.5)	4.0 (39.2)	1.3 (34.3)	−0.2 (31.6)	3.7 (38.6)
Daily mean °C (°F)	−3.0 (26.6)	−3.1 (26.4)	−2.3 (27.9)	−0.3 (31.5)	2.4 (36.3)	4.8 (40.6)	7.1 (44.8)	6.9 (44.4)	5.0 (41.0)	1.8 (35.2)	−0.8 (30.6)	−2.5 (27.5)	1.3 (34.4)
Mean daily minimum °C (°F)	−5.1 (22.8)	−5.4 (22.3)	−4.6 (23.7)	−2.8 (27.0)	−0.4 (31.3)	2.2 (36.0)	4.5 (40.1)	4.4 (39.9)	2.6 (36.7)	−0.4 (31.3)	−2.9 (26.8)	−4.7 (23.5)	−1.0 (30.1)
Average snowfall cm (inches)	57 (22)	62 (24)	49 (19)	43 (17)	17 (6.7)	3 (1.2)	trace	0 (0)	trace	9 (3.5)	36 (14)	47 (19)	323 (126.4)
Average rainy days	1.8	1.3	1.2	3.4	8.6	14.9	16.6	16.6	12.2	9.8	4.1	2.6	93.1
Average snowy days	15.6	15.5	14.7	13.1	8.2	2.6	0.2	0.0	0.8	4.8	11.2	14.0	100.7
Source: Met Office, Tutiempo.net, and snowforecast.com

== Hiking and climbing ==
In clear, calm weather, the ascent of Cairn Gorm is a straightforward hike via the alpine ski area on the northern slopes. But when the mountain is stormbound, particularly in winter during blizzard and high avalanche risk conditions, any ascent or descent can be potentially lethal - particularly during white-outs when it is easy to lose one's bearings near the barren, featureless summit which is ringed in many directions by precipitous drops. In common with all the highest Cairngorm summits, ascents during winter conditions (which can and usually do extend well into springtime) will often require good navigation skills and winter climbing equipment such as crampons and ice-axes. The Windy Ridge path on Sròn an Aonaich lying to the northeast of Coire Cas is a steep and direct route, and is generally recommended by local Rangers, guides and guidebooks. Another route to the summit is the access road up the centre of Coire Cas, however this route is a track used by the railway operator's vehicles, and gives an indirect route with several steep sections. It is not recommended as an ascent route, especially during the skiing season, though it gives good views of the Cairngorm Mountain Railway in its lower sections. Also in Coire Cas, Fiacaill a' Choire Chais offers a good walking route to Cairn Gorm and the adjacent plateau. A circuit of the cliff tops overlooking the Northern Corries of Cairn Gorm is highly recommended in many guide books and publications, giving one of the finest views in Scotland. Walkers are advised to consult the local map and call in at the Ranger Base at the car park.

There are many climbing routes at the head of Coire an t-Sneachda and Coire an Lochain, and in winter these corries form one of Scotland's major ice climbing areas.

=== 1971 disaster ===
On 21–22 November 1971, five pupils from Ainslie Park High School in Edinburgh and a trainee instructor from Newcastle-under-Lyme died in a blizzard at Feith Buidhe on the Cairn Gorm plateau. It stands as the UK's worst mountaineering disaster.

== Wildlife ==
The mountain is home to a number of bird species, including dotterel and ring ouzel (in the spring and summer) and snow bunting and ptarmigan (also known as rock ptarmigan) (all year round). Mammals inhabiting the mountain include mountain hare, red deer and a herd of reindeer. Wildflowers found on the mountain include dwarf cornel, cloudberry and butterwort. For many of these species of flora and fauna, Cairn Gorm is one of their key strongholds.

== Cairngorm Mountain alpine ski area ==
Cairngorm Mountain
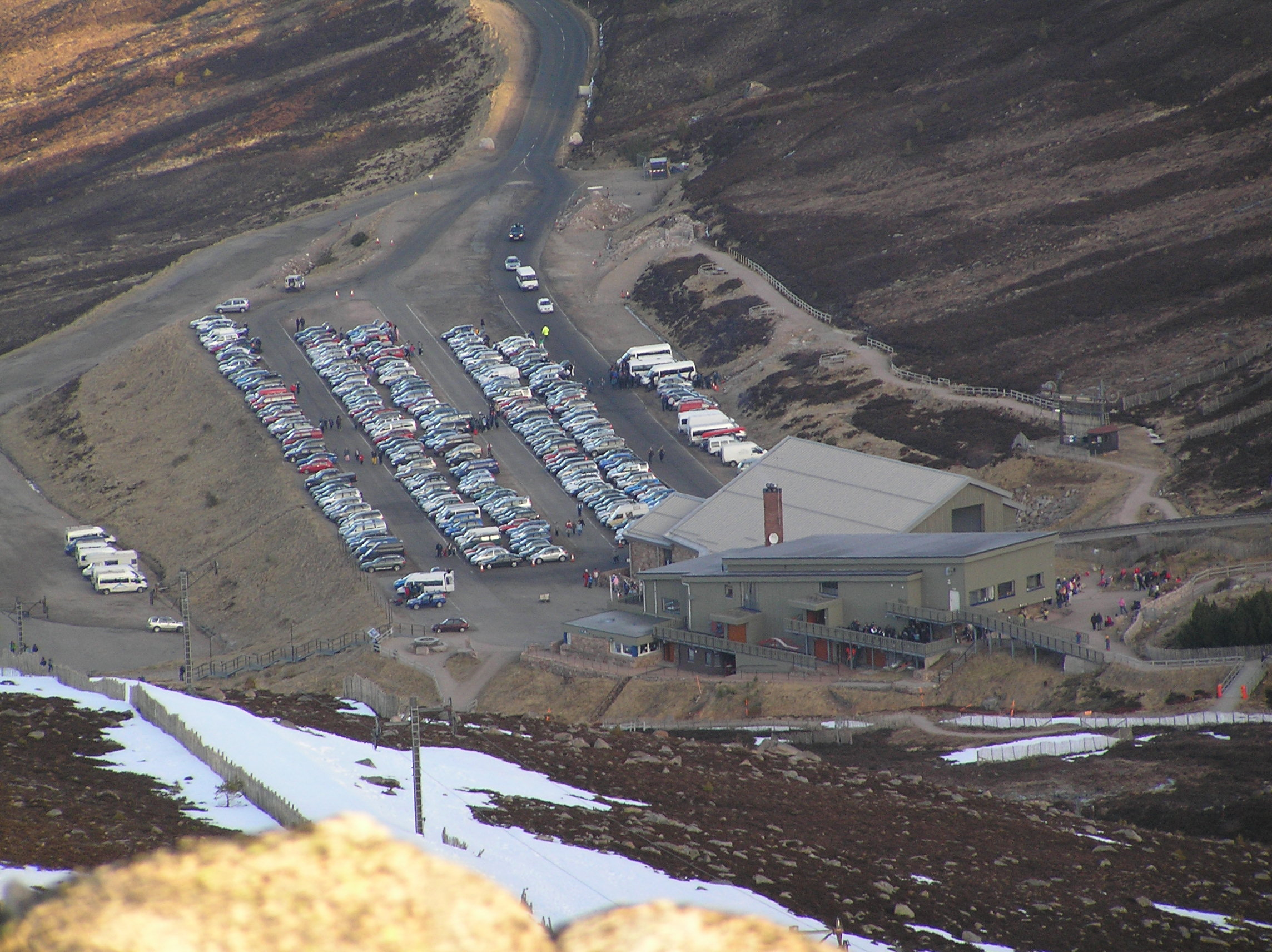
- Cairngorm Mountain base station in June 2008
- Interactive map of Cairngorm Mountain
- Location: Cairn Gorm, near Aviemore; Highland, Scotland; United Kingdom
- Nearest city: Inverness – 40 mi. (65 km)
- Vertical: 1,607 ft (490 m)
- Top elevation: 3,757 ft (1,145 m)
- Base elevation: 2,150 ft (660 m)
- Trails: 35: 11 easier; 10 intermediate; 11 difficult; 3 very difficult
- Lift system: 13: 1 railway (120 person); 4 T-bar lifts; 6 button lifts; 2 chairlifts (mothballed)
- Snowmaking: 4 TechnoAlpin T40, 1 TechnoAlpin TF10, 8 TechnoAlpin TR8, 1 TechnoAlpin double decker Snow Factory
- Night skiing: occasional
- Website: CairnGorm Mountain

=== History ===
The alpine ski area was developed on Cairn Gorm from 1960 onwards. A chairlift and chalet opened in December 1961. In the summer of 1968 a new half mile of road was built that improved access for skiing in the Coire-na-Ciste area. It is the second largest in Scotland (after Glenshee). By the 1980s, thousands of skiers were using the slopes on busy weekends, which could often become very crowded.

By the 2000s, the number of skiers at Cairngorm and Scotland's other ski areas had dropped, partly as a consequence of budget airline travel making access to the Alps more attractive.

Snow conditions in the Scottish Highlands are unpredictable and Global Warming has emerged as a potential threat to the viability of the Scottish ski industry. In 2004, Adam Watson predicted that there would be no more than twenty years left for the industry. However recent winters have had excellent snow cover and ski conditions and winter sports usage has recovered significantly resulting in improved finances. In 2011–12 the resort trialled a TechnoAlpin T40 snow cannon, and in 2012–13 three more were leased. A larger TF10 cannon was added for the 2013–14 season

In April 2014 Natural Retreats was chosen by HIE as the new operator of Cairngorm Mountain Ltd.

=== Funicular controversy ===
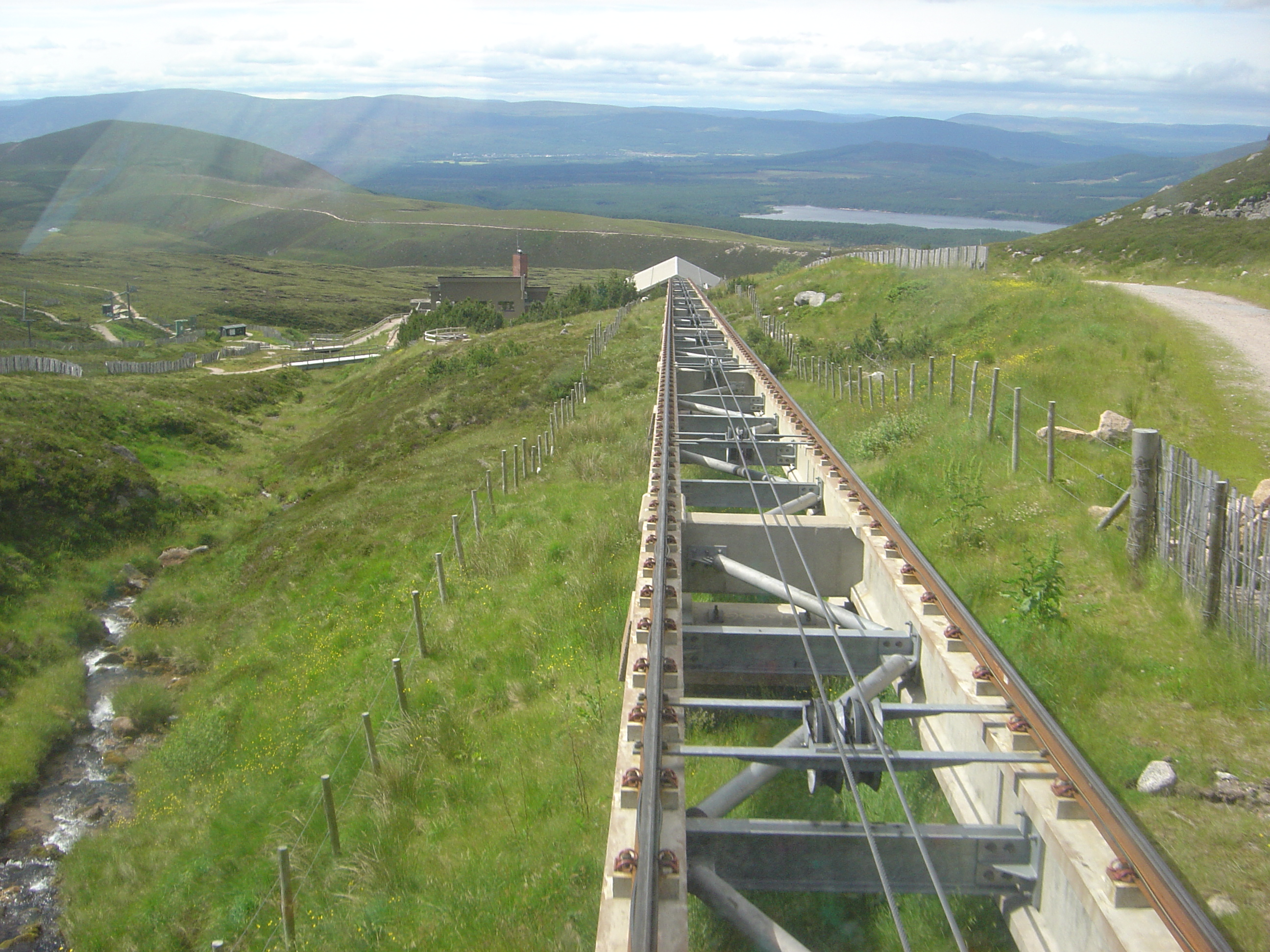
The funicular track

By 1990, much of the original infrastructure was ageing and proving increasingly difficult to maintain. The chairlifts and tows were susceptible to the high winds to which the mountain is prone, and were frequently forced to shut in winds above 25 mph (40 km/h). The operators, Cairngorm Chairlift Company, proposed removing the chairlift and replacing it with a funicular railway.

There was strong opposition to the funicular from environmental groups, who were concerned about damage to the mountain and its fragile soils and plants. The eventual compromise reached, after negotiations with Scottish Natural Heritage, allowed the Cairngorm Mountain Railway to be built, but with restrictions on its usage. Only those engaging in snow sports, or spectating, are allowed to exit from the top station. Other funicular users can visit the restaurant and visitor centre, but are currently restricted from leaving the building to start a walk. However, there are groups campaigning to remove this restriction.

Controversy mired the building project, with budget over-runs, allegations of conflicts of interest by those connected to both Highlands and Islands Enterprise and the construction company and questions raised about the use of public money. The construction was estimated to have cost around £19.6 million, mostly funded by Highlands and Islands Enterprise (HIE), a government body. £2.7 million was provided by the European Union.

The funicular opened in December 2001. The railway provides access from the ski centre's day lodge base station at 2,150 ft (660 m) up the Coire Cas to the ski centre's Ptarmigan building at 3,566 ft (1,087 m) AMSL, a total distance of 6,460 ft (1.97 km). Thie Ptarmigan station is the highest elevation train terminal in the British Isles.

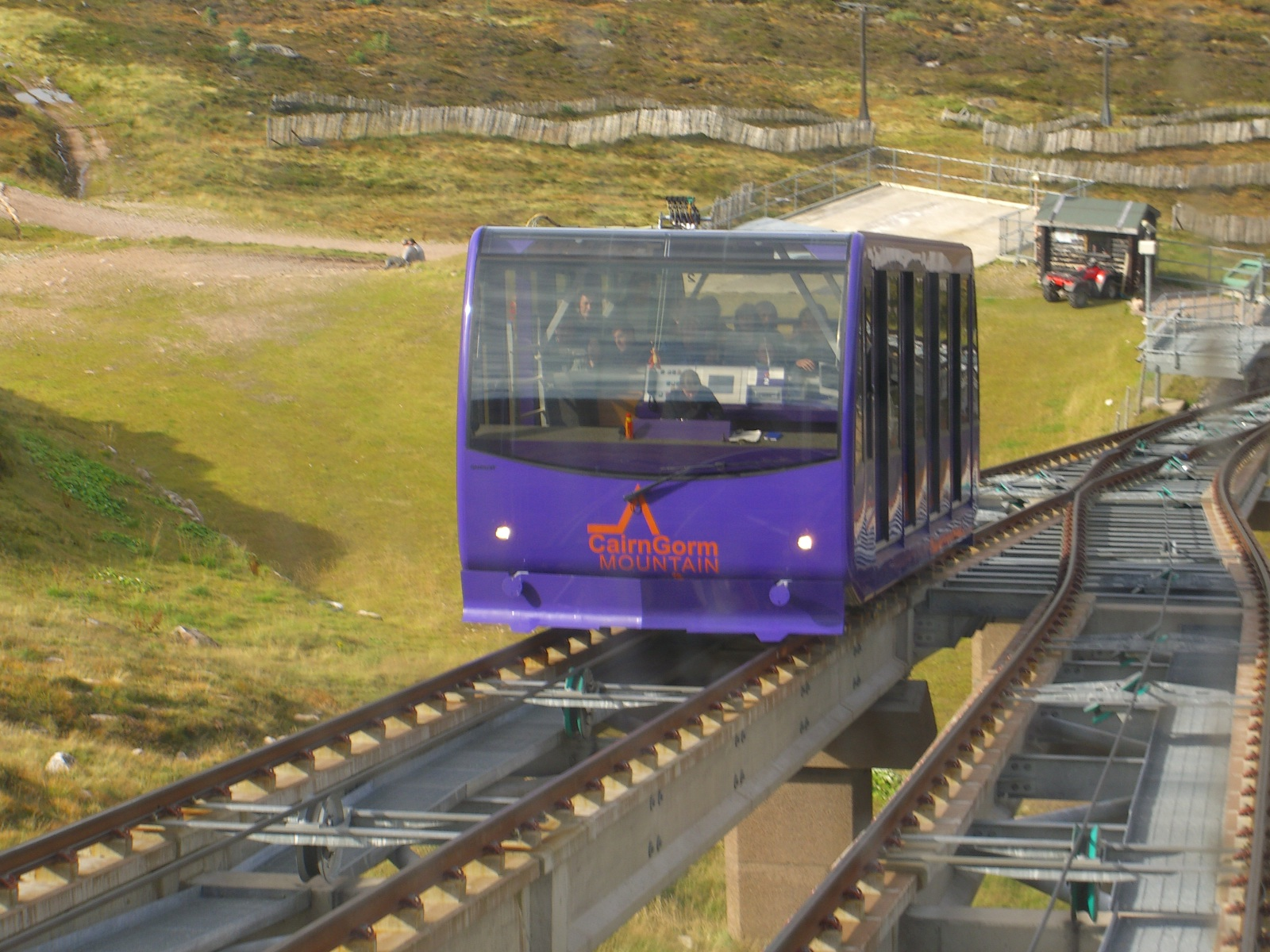
Funicular railway cars passing halfway up.

== Cairn Gorm Locomotive ==
A locomotive operated by Caledonian Sleeper, a train operator that offers sleeper trains from London Euston to Scotland. The locomotive is the only Class 67 locomotive to be operated by Caledonian Sleeper. The locomotive is the subject of a Hornby model with TTS Sound in OO gauge.
