= Sgòr an Lochain Uaine =

Mountain in Aberdeenshire, Scotland

Coordinates: 57.05754°N 3.72622°W

- The Angel's Peak
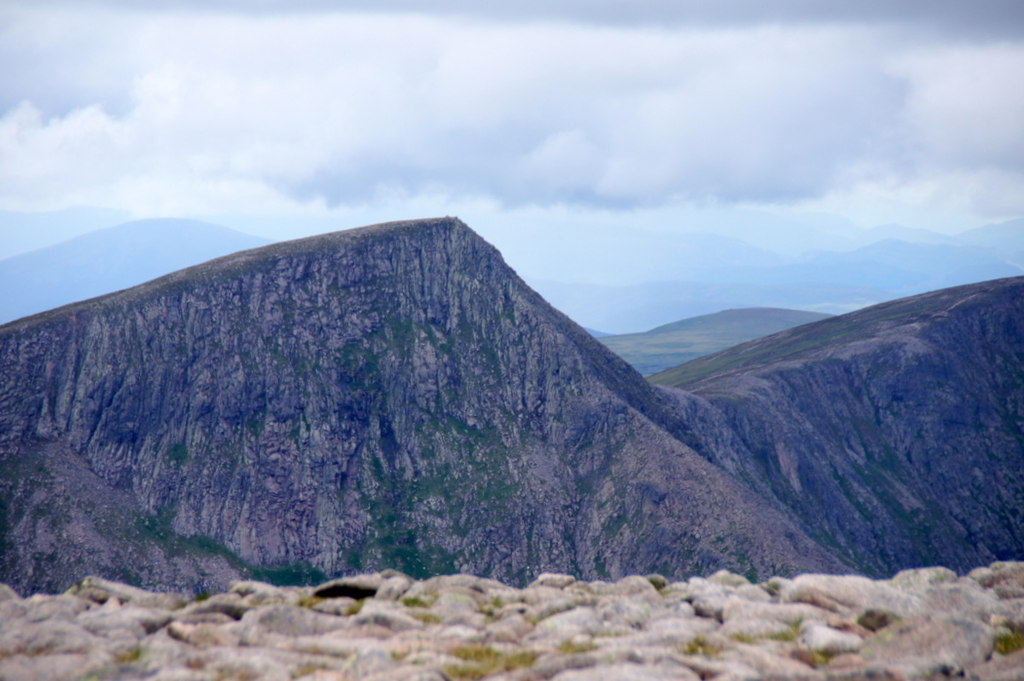
- Sgòr an Lochain Uaine from Ben Macdui

Highest point
- Elevation: 1,258 m (4,127 ft)
- Prominence: 118 m (387 ft)
- Parent peak: Cairn Toul
- Listing: Munro

Naming
- English translation: peak of the green lochan
- Language of name: Gaelic
- Pronunciation: Scottish Gaelic: [ˈs̪kɔɾ ə ˈl̪ˠɔxɛɲ ˈuəɲə]

Geography
- Location within Scotland
- Location: Cairngorms, Scotland
- Parent range: Grampian Mountains
- OS grid: NN954976
- Topo map: OS Landrangers 36, 43

Sgòr an Lochain Uaine (Scottish Gaelic for 'peak of the little green lake') is one of the Cairngorms mountains in the Scottish Highlands. Rising to 1,258 metres (4,127 ft), by some counts it is the fifth-highest mountain in Scotland (and the United Kingdom). It is in the western massif of the Cairngorms, standing between Braeriach and Cairn Toul, overlooking An Garbh Choire and the Lairig Ghru pass. It was promoted to Munro status by the Scottish Mountaineering Club's 1997 revision of the tables.

It is usually climbed together with other peaks: if coming from the south it may be climbed with Cairn Toul and The Devil's Point, whilst from the north one must first cross Braeriach.

The mountain takes its name from An Lochan Uaine, the lochan lying in the corrie on the north-east side of the peak. It is also sometimes called "The Angel's Peak", a name allegedly given to it in the 19th century by Alexander Copland, a founding member of the Cairngorm Club, in contrast to the nearby Devil's Point.

== See also ==
- List of Munro mountains
- Mountains and hills of Scotland
