= Cairn Toul =

Mountain in Scotland

Coordinates: 57.05415°N 3.71122°W

- Càrn an t-Sabhail
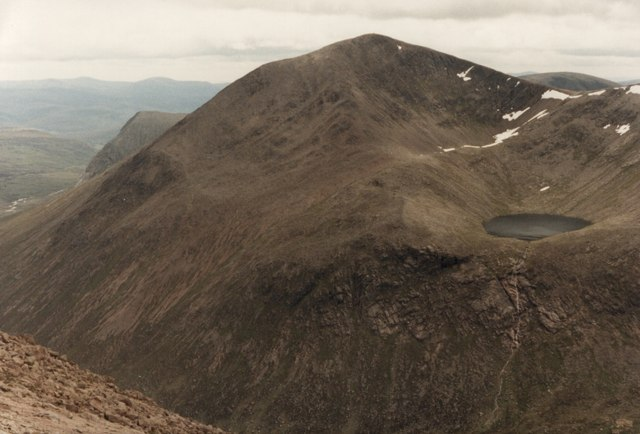
- Cairn Toul from Braeriach, with Lochan Uaine

Highest point
- Elevation: 1,291 m (4,236 ft)
- Prominence: c. 166 m
- Parent peak: Braeriach
- Isolation: 2.85 km (1.77 miles)
- Listing: Munro, Marilyn

Naming
- English translation: hill of the barn
- Language of name: Gaelic
- Pronunciation: Scottish Gaelic: [ˈkʰaːrˠn ən ˈt̪o.əl̪ˠ]

Geography
- Location: Cairngorms, Scotland
- OS grid: NN963972
- Topo map: OS Landrangers 36, 43

Cairn Toul (Scottish Gaelic: Càrn an t-Sabhail, 'hill of the barn') is the 4th-highest mountain in Scotland and all of the British Isles, after Ben Nevis, Ben Macdui and Braeriach. The summit is 1,291 metres (4,236 feet) above sea level. It is in the western massif of the Cairngorms, linked by a bealach at about 1125 m to Braeriach. The mountain towers above the Lairig Ghru pass.

Cairn Toul is often climbed together with other peaks. From the south, it may be climbed with The Devil's Point, which lies about 2.5 kilometres south-southeast. Alternatively, it may be climbed from the north, including Braeriach and Sgor an Lochain Uaine. Both routes are long days by Scottish standards: around 15 km (plus return) regardless of whether one starts from Coire Cas above Speyside, or Linn of Dee to the south. The mountain may also be climbed from the west, starting from Achlean in Glen Feshie. This provides for a slighter shorter route (around 27 km for the round trip), though the walker must negotiate a large expanse of undulating boggy plateau in order to reach the Braeriach-Cairn Toul massif.

There is a bothy, Corrour, at the point below Cairn Toul in the defile of the Lairig Ghru.

== See also ==
- List of Munro mountains
- Mountains and hills of Scotland
