= Corrour Bothy =

Stone building in Aberdeenshire, Scotland

Coordinates: 57°02′27″N 3°40′45″W

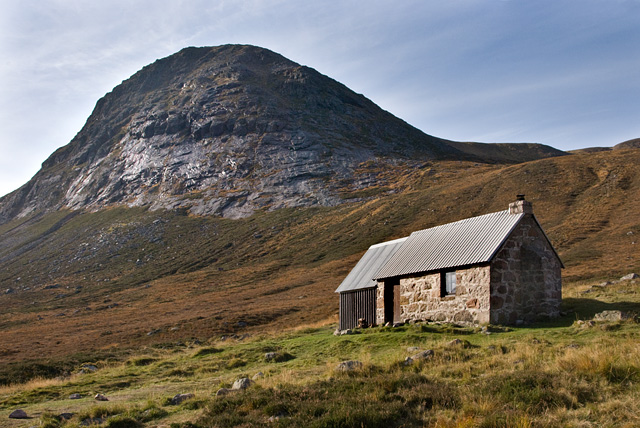
Corrour Bothy in October 2009

Corrour Bothy is a simple stone building on Mar Lodge Estate, Aberdeenshire, Scotland.

It is located below Coire Odhar between The Devil's Point and Cairn Toul on the western side of the River Dee in the Lairig Ghru.

The bothy is a single room with a fireplace and chimney in its northern gable. Its dimensions are 19.6 ft (6m) by 11.8 ft (3.6m). There is a toilet in the wooden extension to the building. It is used as a mountain refuge and as a starting point for ascents of Munros including The Devil's Point, Cairn Toul, and Braeriach.

== Name ==
The name Corrour is used as a name for the locality as well as specifically as a name for the bothy itself, the name being derived from Coire Odhar according to Adam Watson:

... was named after the wide Coire Odhar or dun corrie, which stretches behind the bothy from The Devils Point round to Cairn Toul

— Watson (1975), p. 145

Watson gave the local pronunciation as Corower, but without explanation. However, Seton Gordon, appears to suggest the final-vowels of Coire (and corrie) are dropped to give kor, and that the dh in Odhar are silent because they follow a vowel—giving what sounds like kor-Oar, or like the cor-ower suggested by Watson.

In spite of Watson's earlier work and his understanding of Gaelic—and its local dialect— Dixon and Green suggested an alternative origin for the place name as a shelter for the currour, or forester's assistant.

== History ==
In 1975 Watson wrote that the people of Mar used Coirie Odhar as a summer shieling for their cattle in the early part of the nineteenth century, but in the later part "the area was kept clear for deer".

=== Deer watchers ===
The original bothy was built in 1877 to house a deer watcher during the summer, and it housed several including Charles Robertson, John Macintosh, and Frank Scott before the estate stopped using the bothy in the 1920s. In 1948 Gordon gave some detail about its occupation by deer watchers:

The bothy on the opposite side of the Dee to the Tailors' Stone is known as the Corrour Bothy, receiving its name from the corrie behind it. In the lifetime of the Duke of Fife, a deer-stalker or deer-watcher lived in the bothy from July to October. When I first knew the Cairngorms an old watcher named Charles Robertson, a great character, inhabited the bothy, and was succeeded by John Macintosh

— Gordon (1948), p. 316

An even earlier mention, from 1901, gives an account of passing Corrour Bothy:

At mid-day we were abreast of Glen Geusachan, and Charlie Robertson saluted us from the door of his hut (Corrour) as we passed on the opposite side of the Dee. We thereafter made tracks across the glen, and, fording the Dee, prepared for the ascent of Cairn Toul

— Skea (1901), p. 272

=== Open bothy ===
In 1975 Watson wrote that the last watcher at Corrour Bothy was Frank Scott who left in 1920. After then it then became a 'famous open bothy' with a visitor book being left there in 1928 by the Rucksack Club of University College, Dundee.

In 1949 the bothy was reconstructed by members of the Cairngorm Club, with help from a wide range of individuals and other mountaineering clubs.

Archaeologically, the site is complicated: close to the bothy there are stones in the ground that appear to have formed part of some earlier construction, perhaps the remains of the summer shieling-huts. Dixon and Green considered that they found "the remains of a hut with stone-footings, which is set into the grassy slope a short distance south-east of the present hut".

== Present ==
Tait, in 2006, described the bothy's origin, its reconstruction in 1949 by the Cairngorm Club, and the fact that it is maintained by the Mountain Bothies Association when reporting on the acquisition of full planning permission by the Mountain Bothies Association to add an extension to the bothy to house toilet facilities. A composting toilet has been installed in the extension at the south gable end of the bothy.

Visitors' books started being kept in 1928 and many are preserved, being archived mostly by the Rucksack Club at the Dundee University Archives. Ralph Storer has published extensive extracts from the books, making the observation that, over the years, their literary merit has lagged behind the increase in visitors.

== Gallery ==
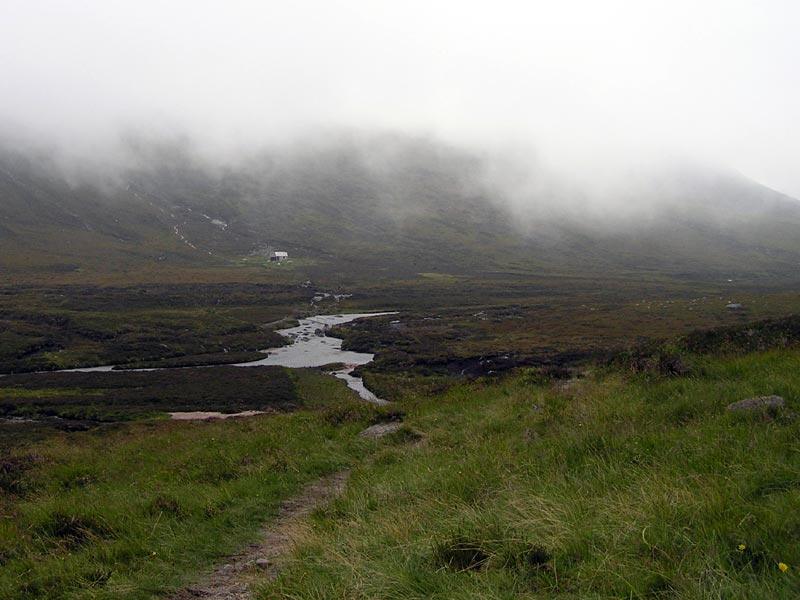
Corrour Bothy

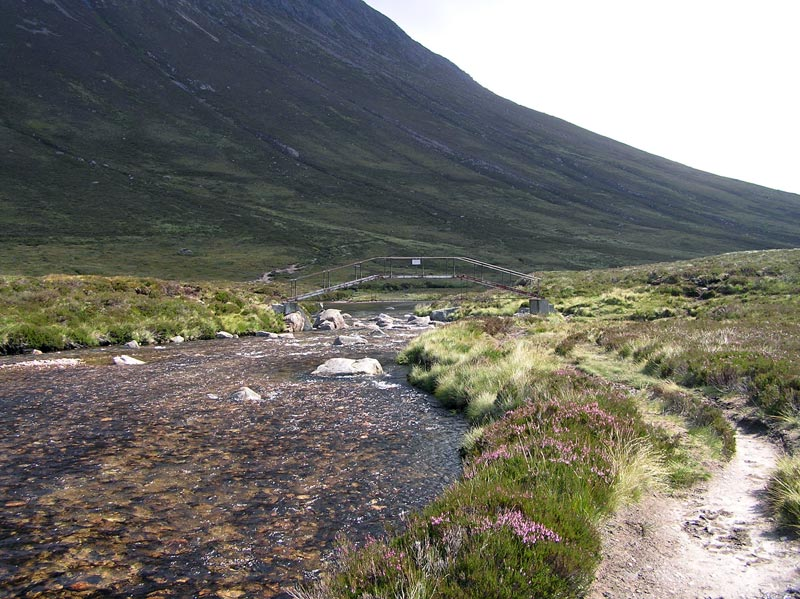
Bridge over Dee at Corrour Bothy

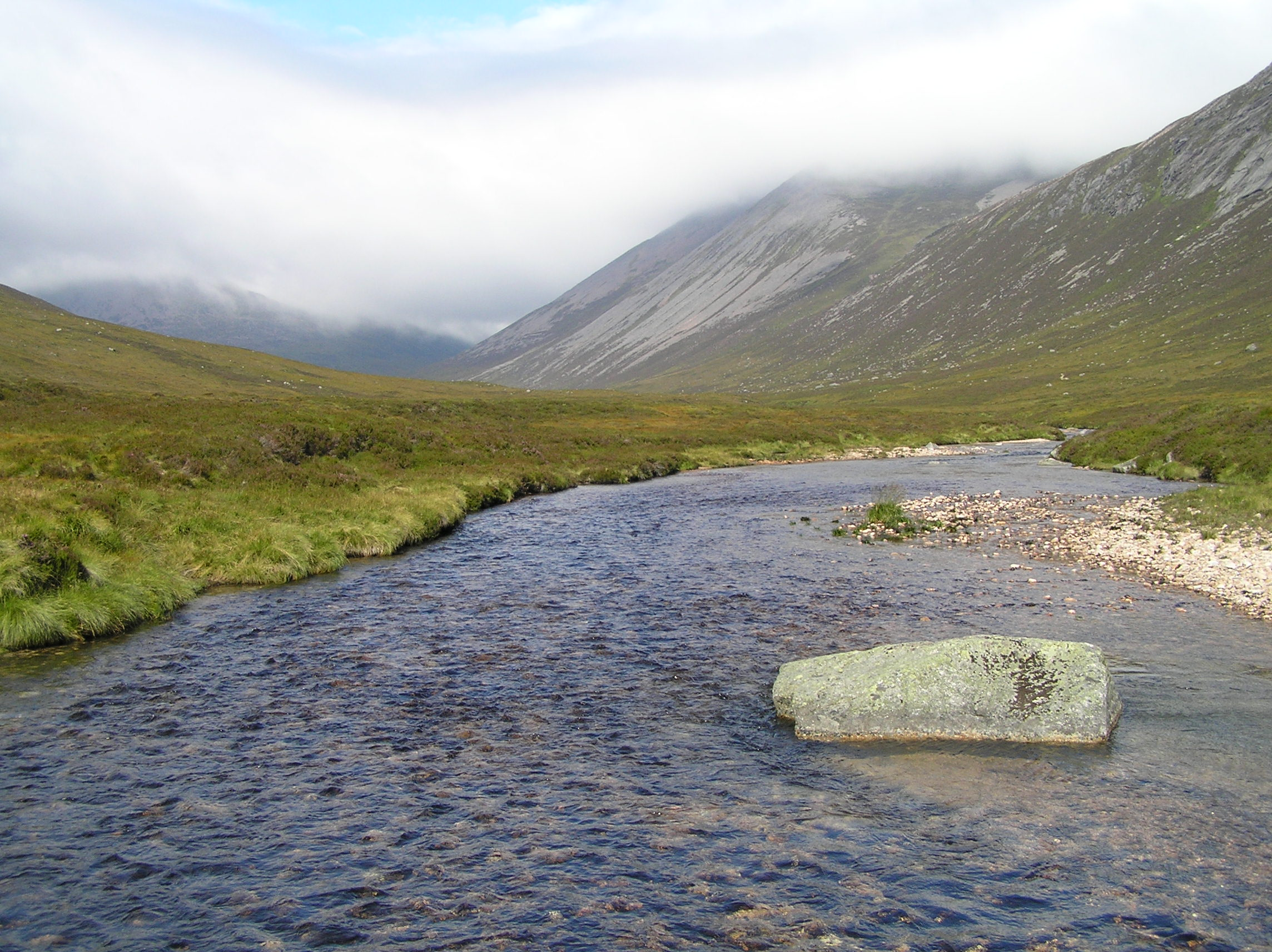
The Dee near Corrour Bothy

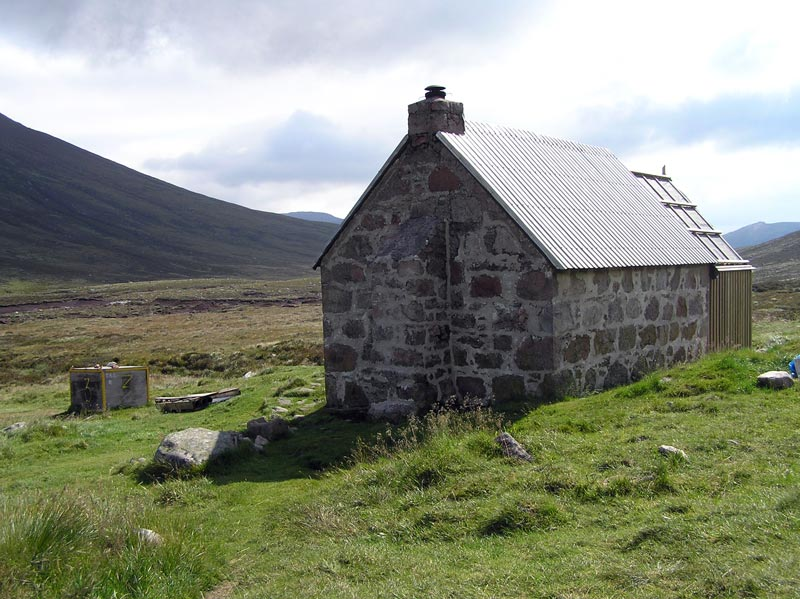
Corrour Bothy

== See also ==
- List of Mountain Bothies Association bothies
- Places, place names, and structures on Mar Lodge Estate

== Sources ==
- Dixon, P.J.; Green, S.T. (1995). Mar Lodge Estate Grampian : An Archaeological Survey (PDF). Royal Commission on the Ancient and Historical Monuments of Scotland, Edinburgh.
- Gordon, Seton (1948). Highways and Byways in the Central Highlands. MacMillan & Co. Ltd, London, England.
- Skea, William (1901). "Article title unknown". Cairngorm Club Journal (17). Aberdeen: Cairngorm Club.
- Storer, Ralph (2020). Corrour Bothy: a refuge in the wilderness. Edinburgh: Luath Press. ISBN 978-1-913025-56-4.
- Tait, Andrew (2006). "Report On Called-In Planning" (PDF). Cairngorms National Park Authority.
- Taylor, G.A (1950). "The Reconstruction of Corrour Bothy". Cairngorm Club Journal. XVI (87).
- Watson, Adam (1975). The Cairngorms. Edinburgh: The Scottish Mountaineering Trust.
