= Lairig an Laoigh =

Major mountain pass in Cairngorms, Scotland

Coordinates: 57°05′04″N 03°35′36″W

Lairig an Laoigh and Lairig Ghru passes

The Lairig an Laoigh (/ˈlɑːrɪɡ ən ˈluːi/ LAR-ig ən LOO-ee; Scottish Gaelic: Làirig Laoigh) is a mountain pass through the Highlands of Scotland. In speech and sometimes in writing the name is reduced to "Lairig Laoigh". It is of glacial origin, dissecting the Cairngorm plateau, and it runs roughly north–south from Speyside to Deeside at one time being used as a drove road. Between the public road in the Abernethy Forest and the one at Linn of Dee the trekking distance is 31 kilometres (19 mi).

== General situation ==
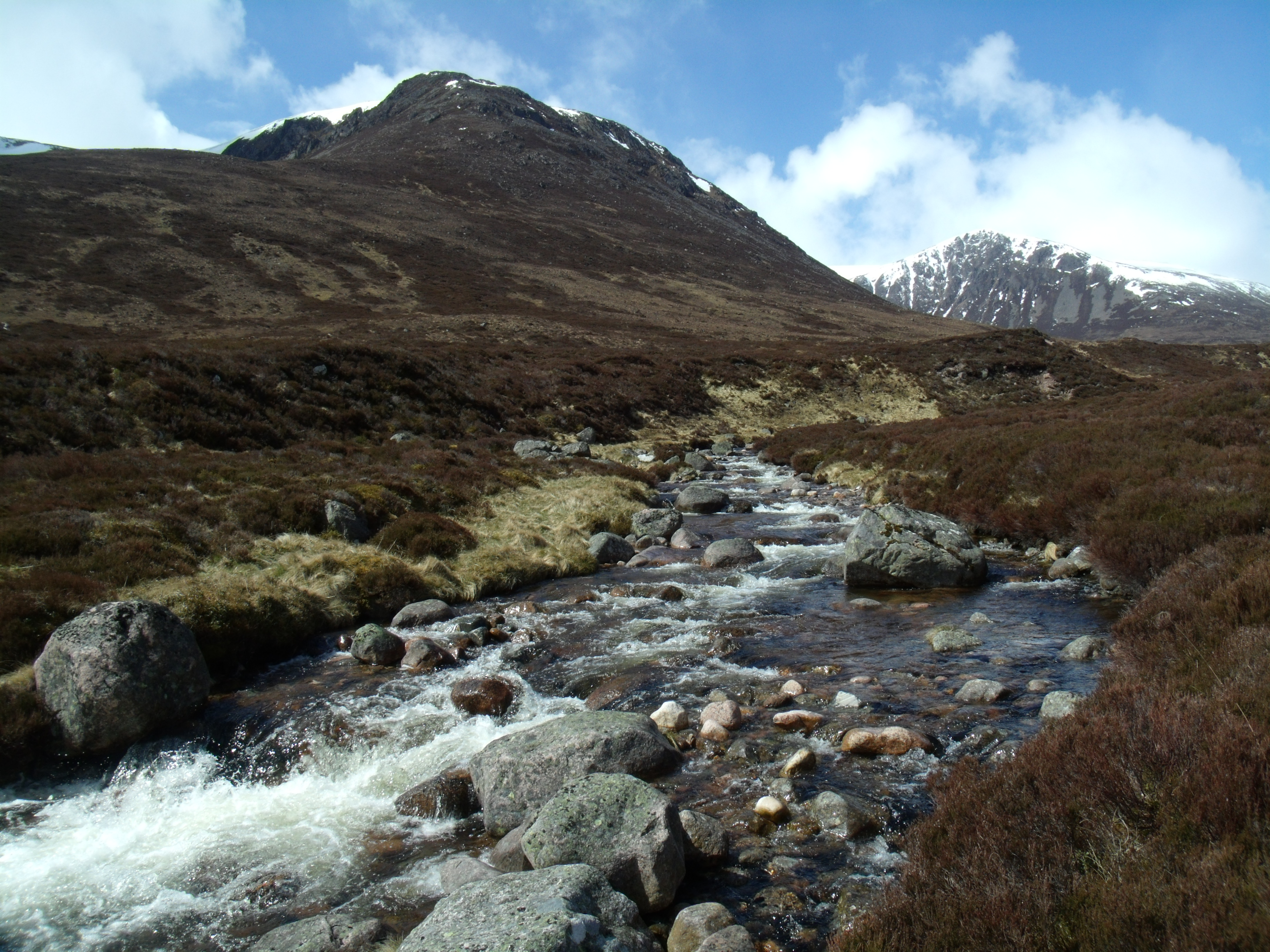
Derry Burn (Uisge an Doire), looking north

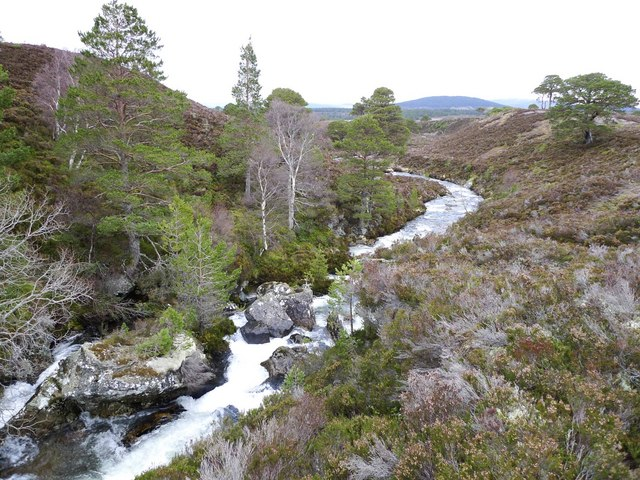
River Nethy

The name Lairig an Laoigh means "pass of Lui" or possibly "pass of the calves". In its southerly part it lies in the Mar Lodge Estate, owned by the National Trust for Scotland where Derry Burn flows into Lui Water, a tributary of the River Dee. The northern part is in the Abernethy Estate, owned by the Royal Society for the Protection of Birds where the River Nethy flows north to the River Spey. The whole area is in the Cairngorms National Park.

The Lairig an Laoigh runs roughly parallel to the somewhat grander and far better-known Lairig Ghru which lies some 6 kilometres (4 mi) to the west. They both dissect the high granite Cairmgorm plateau which is at about 1,200 metres (3,900 ft). The Lairig an Laoigh reaches 740 metres (2,430 ft) at the watershed between the rivers Dee and Avon and the lairig attains 792 metres (2,598 ft) further north in more open country where it skirts Bynack More before reaching the River Nethy. At its highest point the pass is above 760 metres (2,500 ft) – the height for a peak to be a Corbett. The Avon and Nethy are tributaries of the River Spey. Between the lairigs Ghru and Laoigh is the central Cairngorn Plateau, with Ben Macdui and Cairn Gorm situated on it, the second and sixth highest mountains in Britain.

The pass (and the nearby Lairig Ghru) is an example of glacial breaching where ice cuts through the watershed between two valleys. With glaciers flowing down the Dee and Spey valleys, it is thought that the Dee became choked so that ice was forced to the north, grinding a route through the granite of the Cairngorms. With a series of glaciations the original valleys remain but breaches right across the watershed are produced.

== History ==
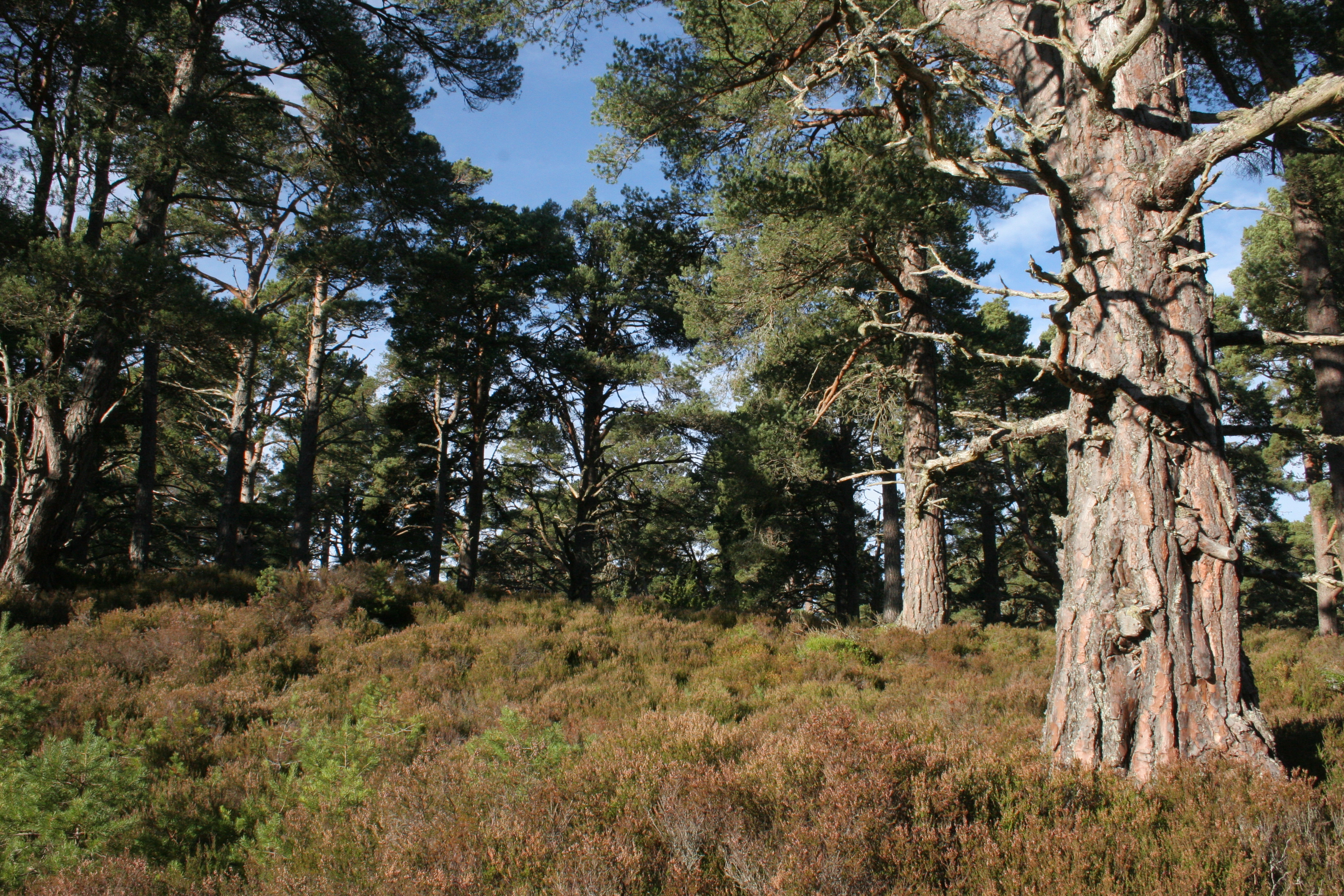
Abernethy Forest

From about 1766, cattle droving was carried out on a large scale to move cattle from Scotland to England. Beef cattle from the far north and northeast of Scotland were driven through several passes through the Cairngorms, but particularly the Lairig an Laoigh, to reach Braemar and then onwards south often to the Falkirk Tryst where English drovers continued the journey. Droving died out in the late 19th century. As with other passes, there were castles near both approaches at Kindrochit Castle and, later, Braemar Castle and Castle Roy at Nethy Bridge and where there also used to be agricultural dwellings.

To the north of Derry Lodge is a point on the burn called Derry Dam. A sluice was built here early in the 19th century by Alexander Davidson who used it to help float timber down the glen. Further north the Lochan Uaine is in a high corrie to the west where William Smith, an 18th century deer stalker, wrote a poem which later became a well-known song "Allt an Lochain Uaine".

== Trekking routes ==
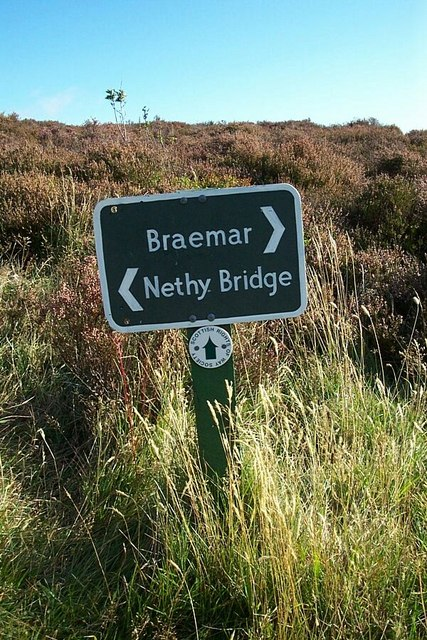
Lairig an Laoigh at Ryvoan Pass signing Braemar and Nethy Bridge

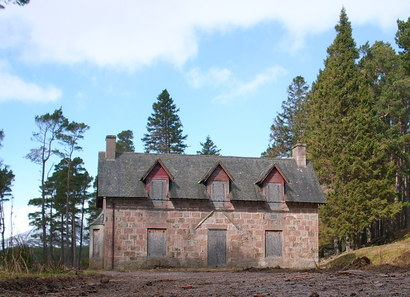
Derry Lodge

Travelling south to north, the route through the pass goes from just east of Linn of Dee up Glen Lui beside Lui Water as far as Derry Lodge – 5 kilometres (3.1 mi). At this point Glen Lui veers to the west and Derry Burn (Scottish Gaelic: Uisge an Doire, "Water of the Copse") flows down from the north through Glen Derry, the name given to the more southern stretch of Lairig an Loaigh. After another 6 kilometres (3.7 mi) Coire Etchachan Burn flows in from the northwest coming down from Loch Etchachan.

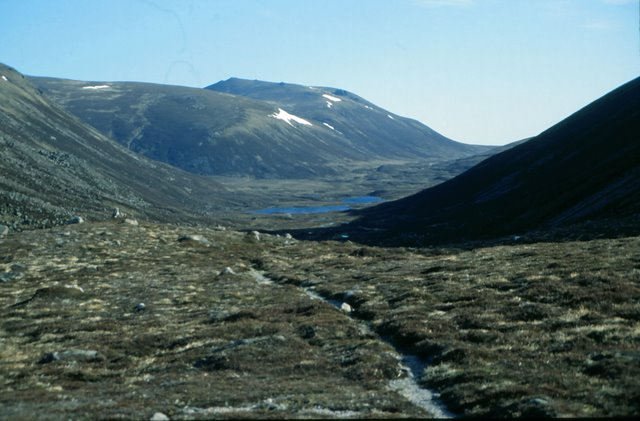
Looking north from the Dee–Avon watershed

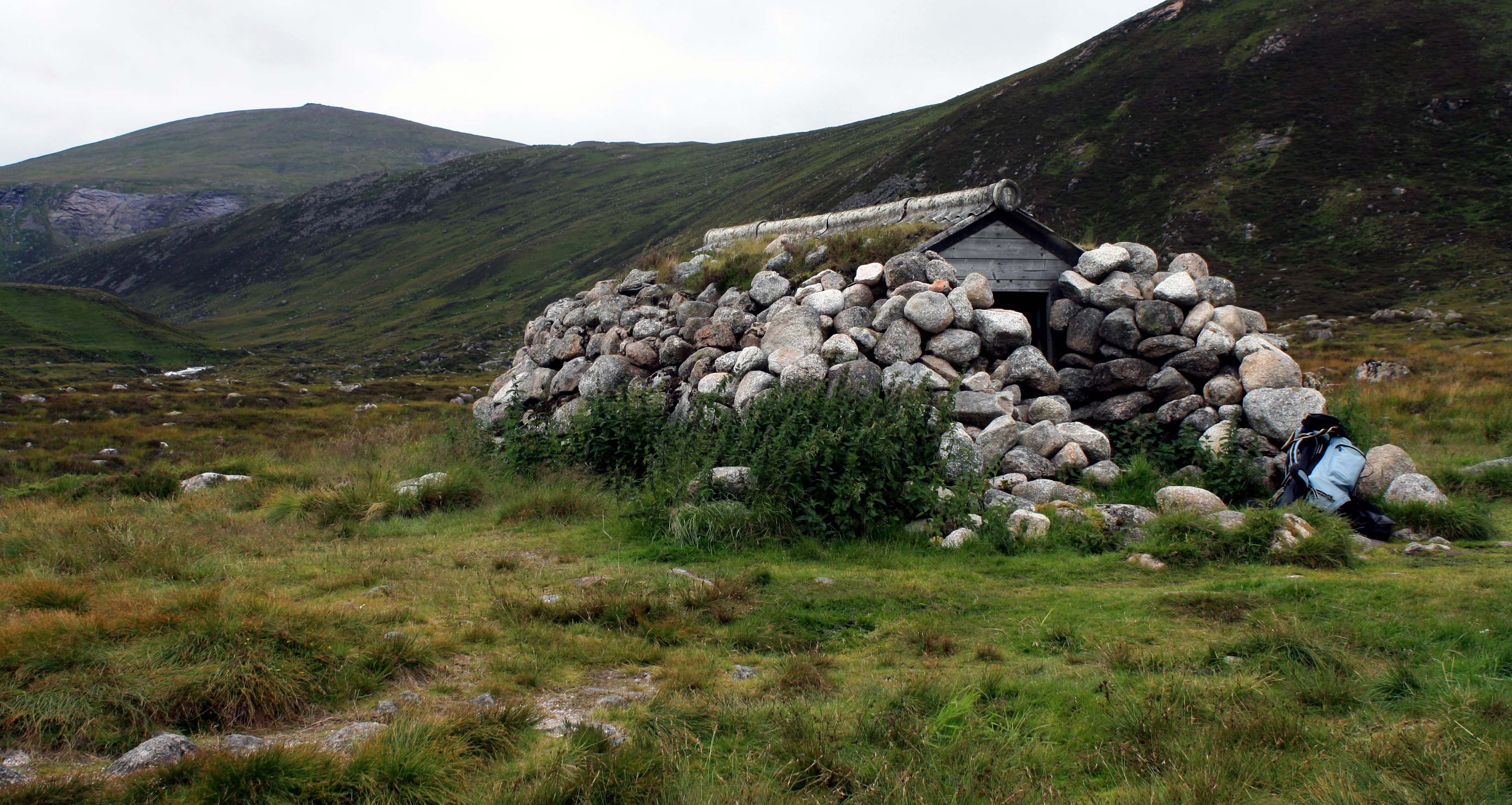
Fords of Avon refuge

Continuing north the Laoigh crosses the Dee–Avon watershed at 740 metres (2,430 ft) and descends to the Fords of Avon refuge, another 4 kilometres (2.5 mi). Here the line of the Laoigh is crossed by the River Avon flowing west–east down from Loch A'an. Despite the stepping stones over the Avon, it may not be possible to cross safely so it may be necessary to go upstream past the Shelter Stone and make a crossing of Garbh Uisge Mor at the head of Loch A'an before returning to Fords of Avon but on the other side of the river. This adds nearly 10 kilometres (6 miles) to the journey. Ascending again to 792 metres (2,598 ft) the route continues north to Bynack Stable, 9 kilometres (5.6 mi) from Fords of Avon.

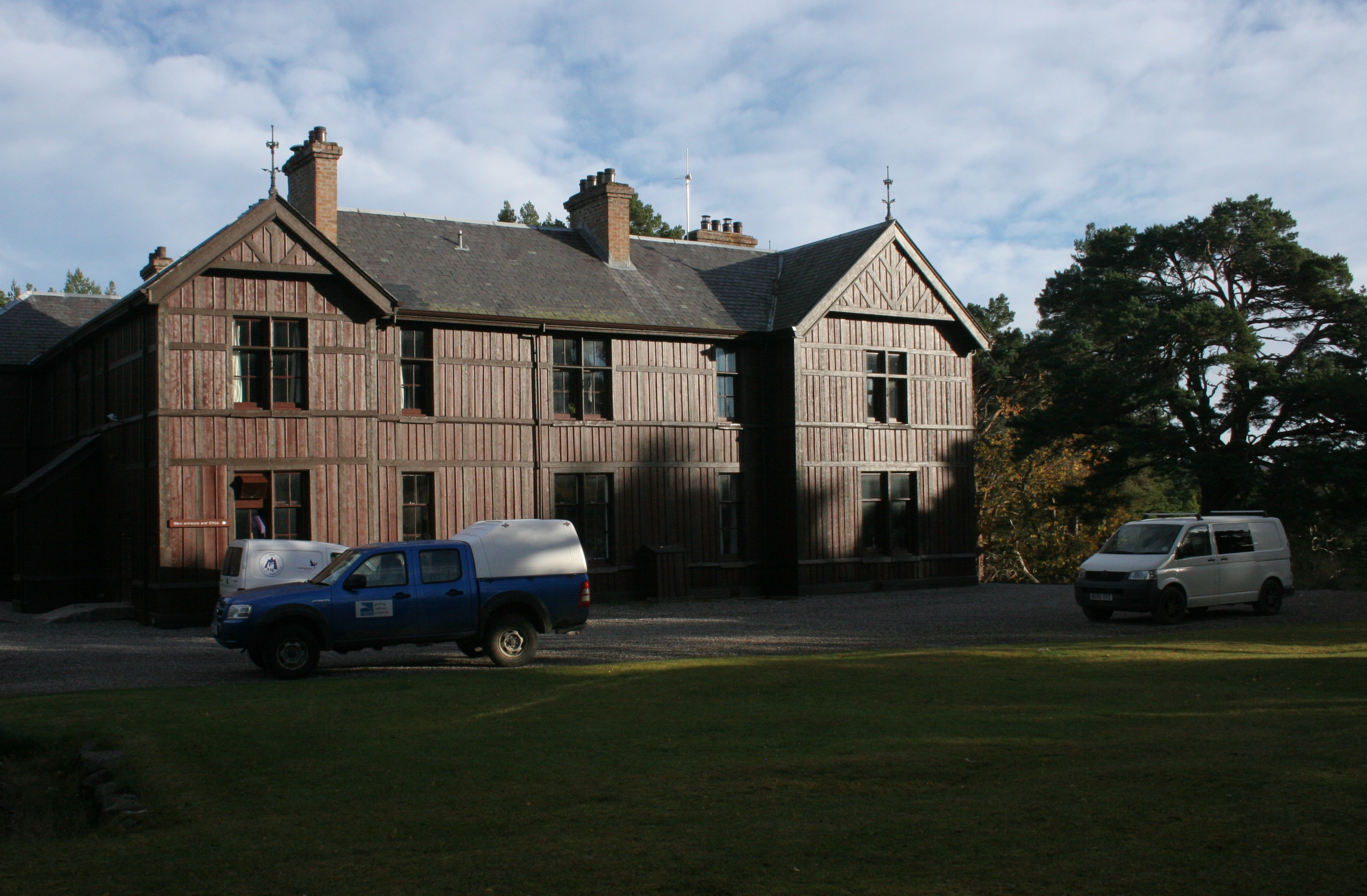
Forest Lodge, Scottish HQ of RSPB

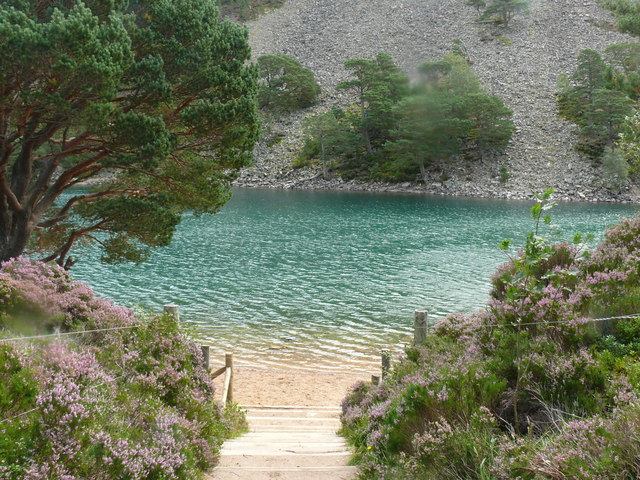
Lochan Uaine, west of Bynack Stable

The route then passes just south of Loch a' Garbh-choire and passes Ryvoan Bothy to reach Forest Lodge, the headquarters of the RSPB in Scotland. The nearest public road, somewhat west of Forest Lodge, is 7 kilometres (4.3 mi) from Bynack Stable. An alternative route from Bynack Stable, which involves leaving the Laoigh, is to travel west past Lochan Uaine (a different lochan from the one in the song) to Glenmore Lodge beside Loch Morlich – this shortens the total distance by 2.5 kilometres (1.6 mi).

However, from Fords of Avon a different walking route is often taken by turning sharply to the west and following the River Avon upstream. After reaching the north shore at the foot of Loch A'an the route turns north, passes over The Saddle at 807 metres (2,648 ft) and follows the headwaters of the River Nethy down Strath Nethy to Bynack Stable. This route is possibly more interesting and it is safer in winter. Another consideration: in winter navigation is more straightforward travelling north to south.
