= The Devil's Point =

Mountain in Aberdeenshire, Scotland

Coordinates: 57.03558°N 3.68895°W

- Bod an Deamhain
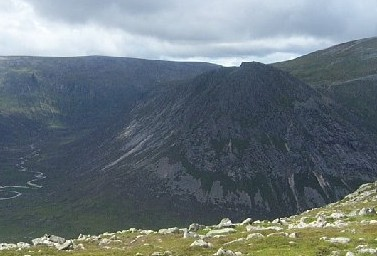

Highest point
- Elevation: 1,004 m (3,294 ft)
- Prominence: c. 89 m
- Parent peak: Cairn Toul
- Listing: Munro

Naming
- English translation: Penis of the demon
- Language of name: Scottish Gaelic
- Pronunciation: Scottish Gaelic: [ˈpɔt̪ əɲ ˈtʲãũ.ɪɲ]

Geography
- Location: Cairngorms, Scotland
- OS grid: NN976951
- Topo map: OS Landranger 43

The Devil's Point (Scottish Gaelic: Bod an Deamhain) is a mountain in the Cairngorms of Scotland, lying to the west of the Lairig Ghru pass. The Gaelic name means "Penis of the Demon". The English name is a result of a visit to the area by Queen Victoria. She asked her local ghillie, John Brown, to translate the name; to avoid embarrassment he gave a euphemistic answer.

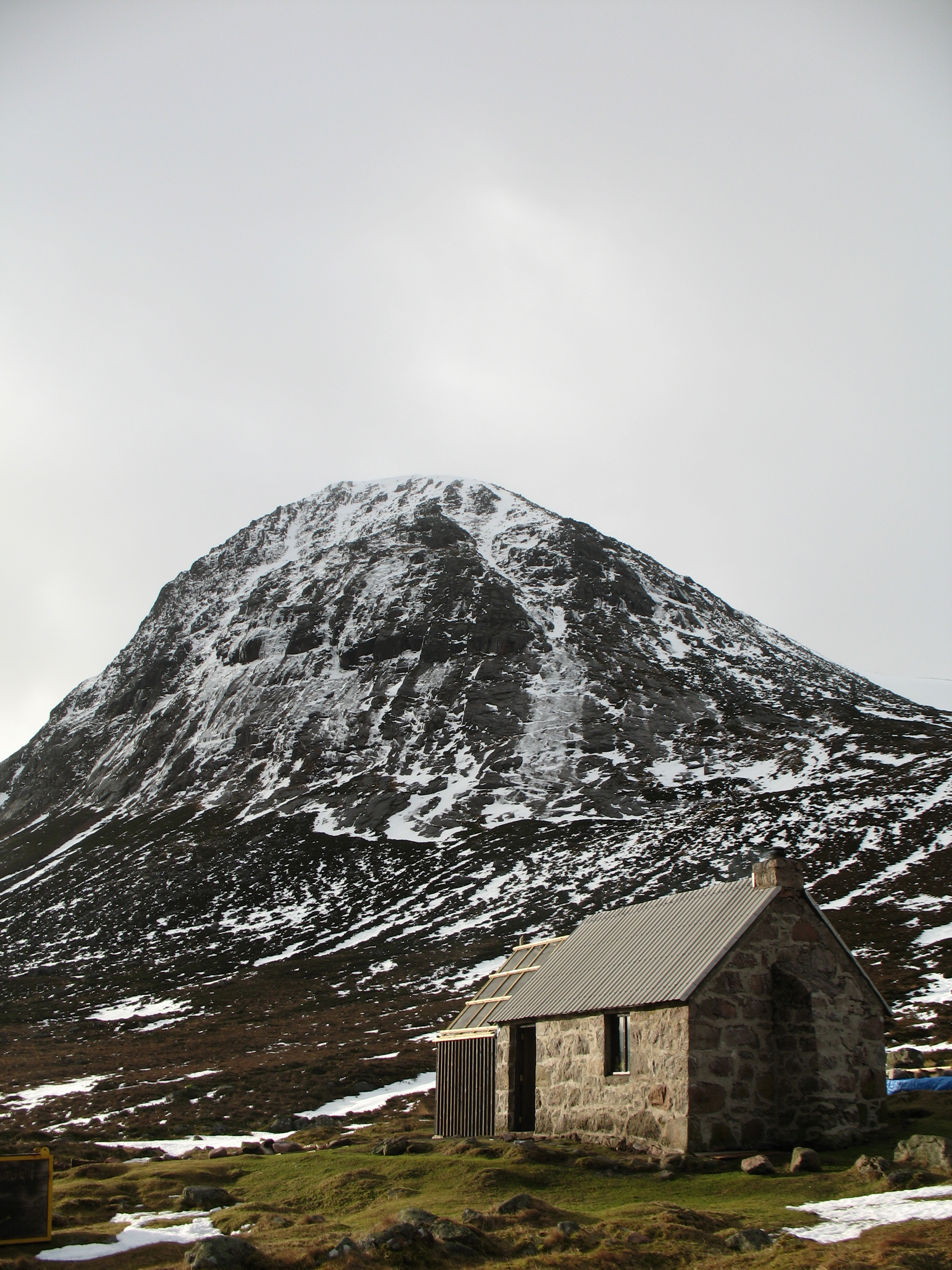
Devil's Point and Corrour Bothy

Although The Devil's Point is strikingly distinct when seen from the south, it is a subsidiary peak of Cairn Toul, the summit of which lies some three kilometres (two miles) to the north. The easiest route is to follow the path leading up the Coire Odhar from Corrour Bothy, on the eastern side of the mountain. To reach the bothy requires a long walk in; the most usual route is to follow the Lairig Ghru from Linn of Dee, a distance of some 12 km (7 1/2 mi).

The Devil's Point is often climbed along with Cairn Toul. Sgòr an Lochain Uaine, which lies to the north of Cairn Toul is sometimes called The Angel's Peak, in contrast to The Devil's Point.

== See also ==
- The Devil's Arse, Derbyshire, England
