= Glen Lui =

Valley in Aberdeenshire, Scotland

Coordinates: 57.011°N 3.557°W

Glen Lui from Gleann Laoigh – calves' glen – Gordon (1925) is one of the major glens on the Mar Lodge Estate, in Aberdeenshire, Scotland.

Its main watercourse is the Lui Water a tributary of the River Dee, which it joins about a half-mile downstream from the Linn of Dee.

== Canadian Campsite to Linn of Lui ==
Known colloquially as the Canadian Campsite – this Lumber Camp was occupied during World War II by Canadian Lumberjacks. The Canadian Campsite covered the corner of land on the East bank of the Lui Water and the North bank of the River Dee and extending northward across the public road – the area is now covered by a plantation created in the 1980s.

Before the Plantation was created the wartime occupation was evident on the ground with concrete blocks on the surface, partially rotted logs 'nailed' together with ½" spikes. In some of the standing Scots Pines were mounted insulators for carrying wire – presumably for their telephone system.

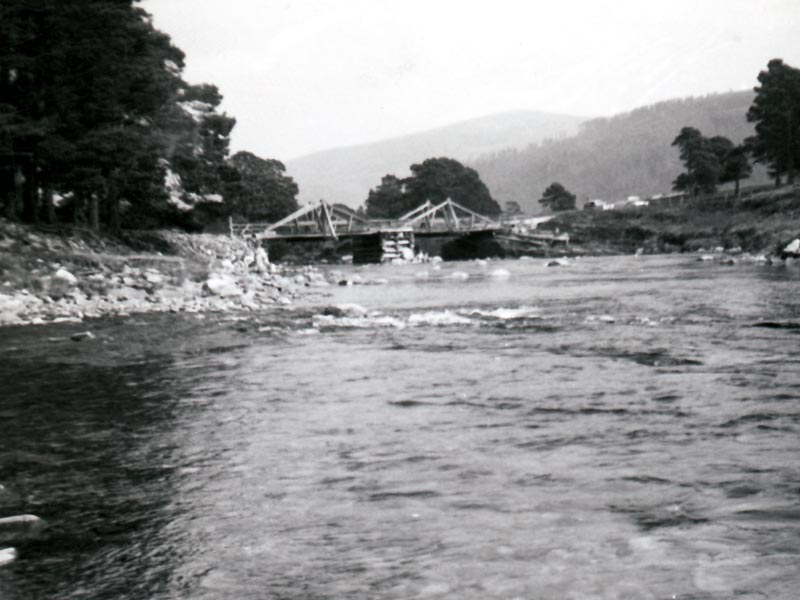

Near the small beach on the south side of the Canadian Campsite a log-bridge crossed the River Dee and there are still spiked-logs on the north bank and spikes in the rock on the south-bank to show its exact position. The bridge survived into the 1960s – Wyness (1968) shows a photograph of the bridge adding in his notes:

The bridge built over the River Dee above Inverey by Canadian lumbermen during the Second World War. Damaged by floods, it was eventually demolished.

— Wyness, Fenton

Until the Plantation was created the Canadian Campsite was used as a campsite by campers and caravaners. Hillwalkers camped overnight before heading into the Cairngorms or continuing their journey to Braemar. Some of the caravan owners left their caravans at the Canadian Campsite on a semi-permanent basis with 'regulars' maintaining a weekend and holiday community. Mar Lodge Estate more than tolerated the use of this area as a campsite – they managed the 'rubbish problem' on the campsite by maintaining a rubbish pit – covering it over when full, and digging another nearby.

Also on the Canadian Campsite there was a 'big ditch' apparently man-made, that appeared to have been open to the Lui Water. At its deepest and widest point the ditch was over 10 feet deep, and 20 feet wide. There were many 'spiked' logs at regular intervals along the ditch and perpendicular to its axis.

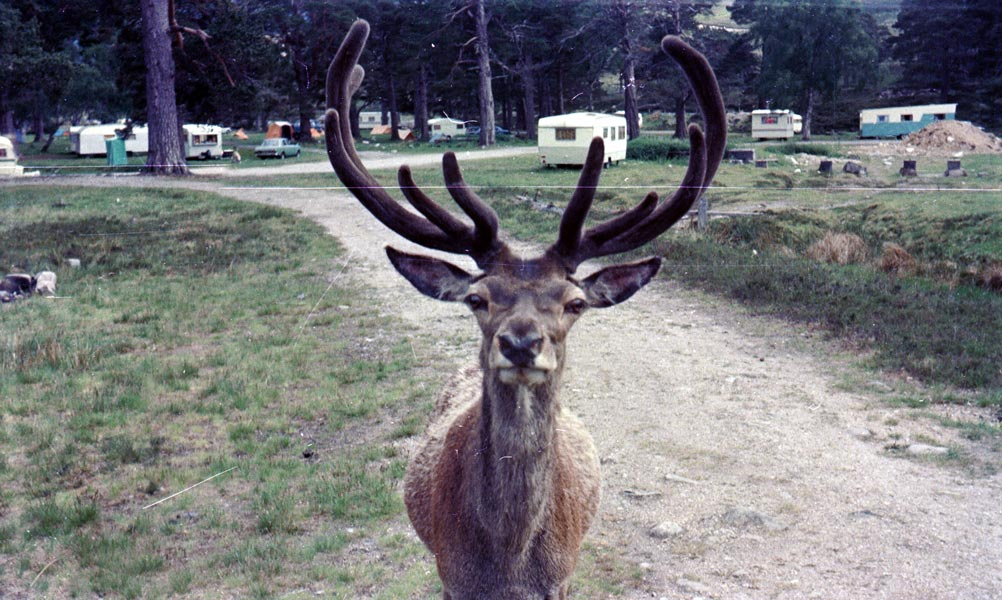
The Canadian Campsite showing concrete blocks and rubbish-pit spoil (1970s).

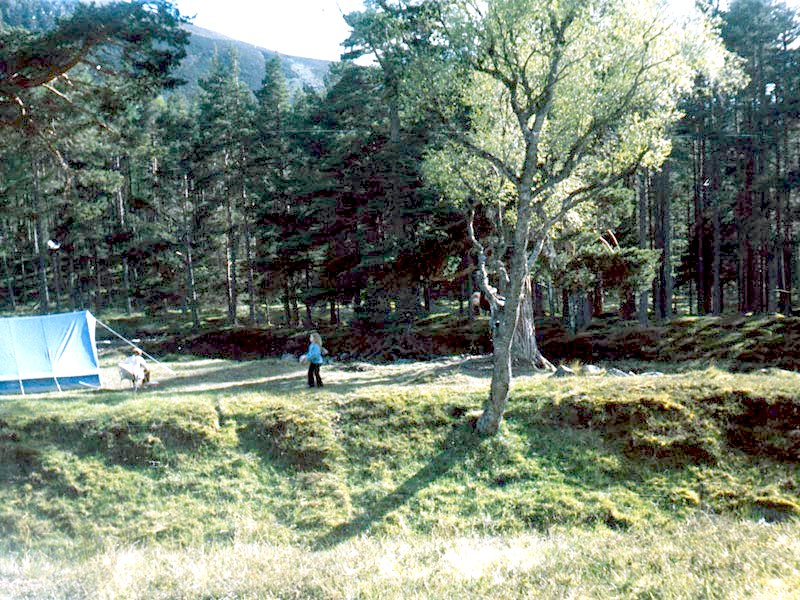
The Canadian Campsite showing the 'big ditch' (1970s).

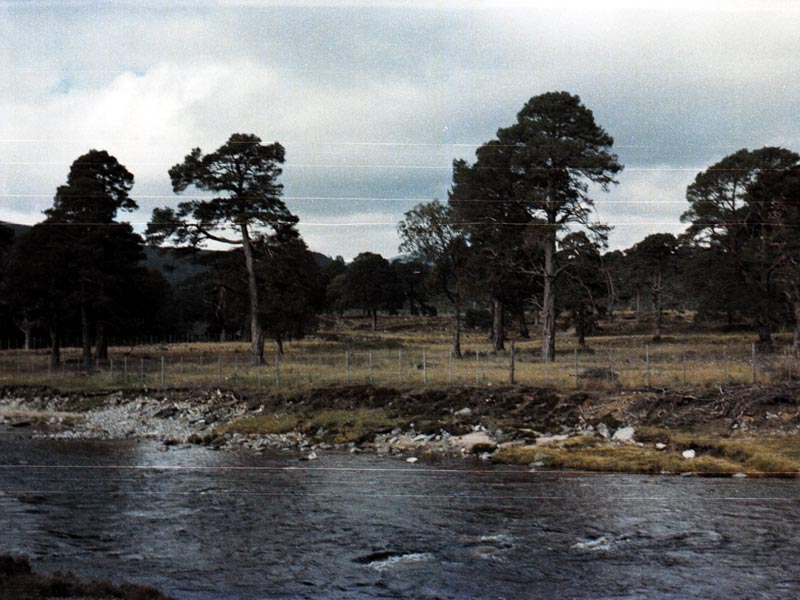
The Canadian Campsite after it was fenced off (1980s).

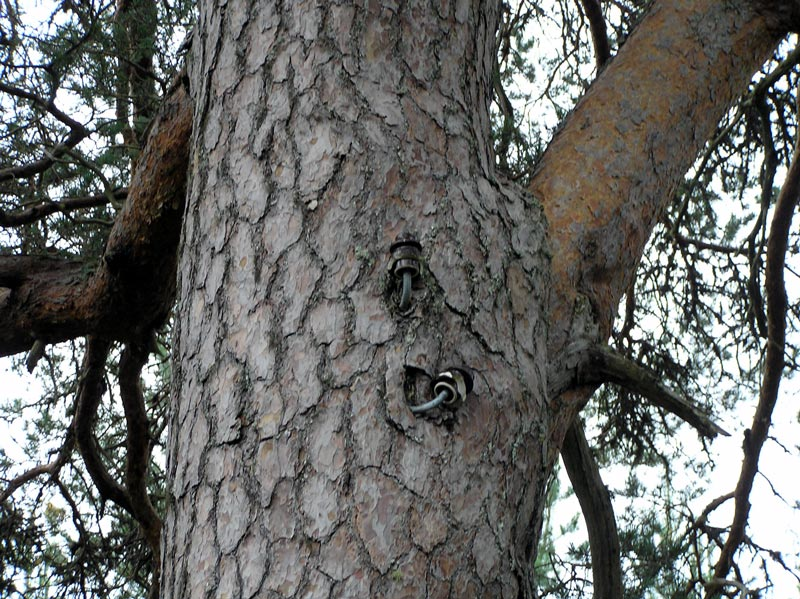
Isolators in a tree.

About a hundred and fifty yards from its confluence with the River Dee, the Lui Water is bridged by a public road at the Linn of Lui. This public road leads (roughly E) towards Mar Lodge and Allanaquoich, and (roughly W) towards Linn of Dee.

== Linn of Lui to Black Bridge ==
Along the public road (roughly W) one hundred yards or so from the Linn of Lui is a wooden gate across a four-wheel drive road that marks the start of one of the main routes from the South to the Lairig Ghru. This route can be followed up Glen Lui following the course of the Lui Water from either the wooden gate at the public road or from the Linn of Dee car park by follow the signposted track through the plantation. Either way – heading (roughly N) the four-wheel drive road leads to the Black Bridge. Although now painted red it is still referred to as the Black Bridge.

In the Lui Water slightly upriver from the bridge are the remains of 'sluices and concrete banks' created by the Canadians in their occupation of the area – Watson (1975).

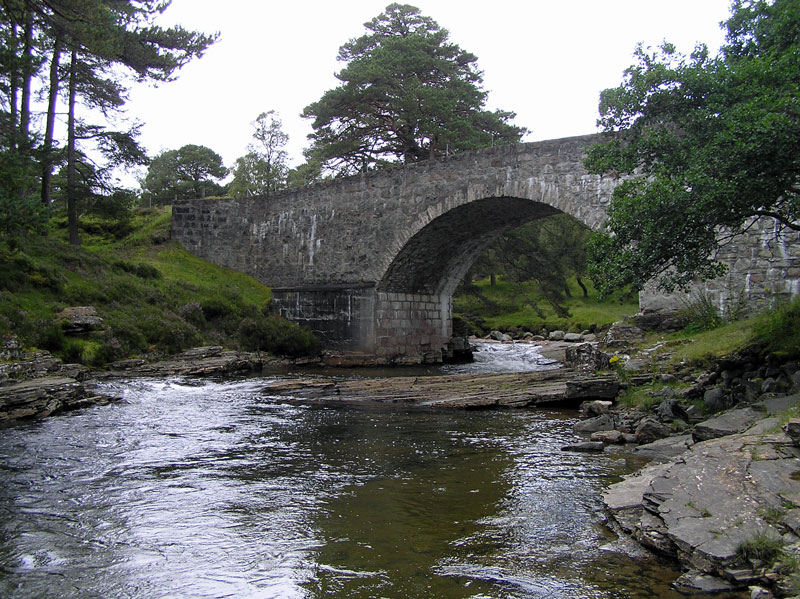
Linn of Lui

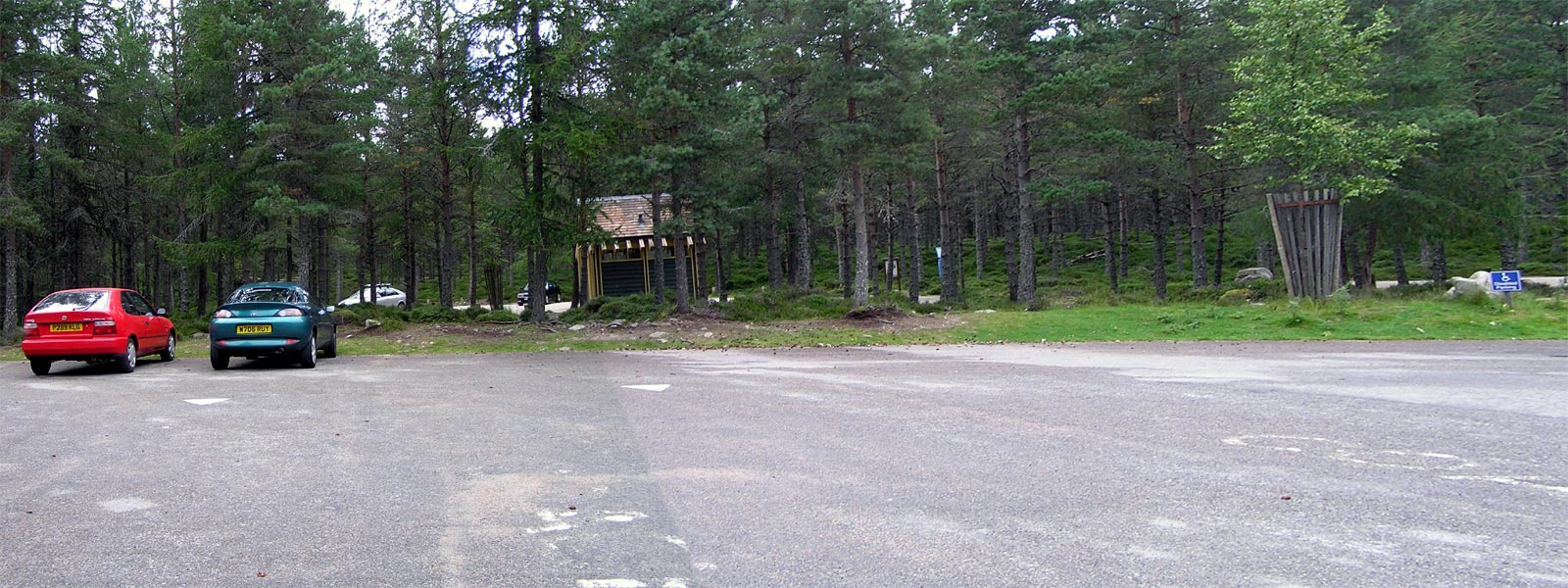
Linn of Dee car park

== Black Bridge to Derry Wood ==
Crossing Black Bridge – turn left (roughly NNW) following the four-wheel drive road up Glen Lui and towards The Derry.

This part of Glen Lui is a broad glaciated valley dotted with moraines – the remains of the ancient glacial past. Other remains – seen as grassy, roughly rectangular outlines – are those of the townships and farms.

In Gordon (1925) the author laments:

In the old days each hollow, knoll, and thicket had a name. Now many of these old names are no longer used. Even their existence is unknown, so they are irreparably lost

— Gordon (1925) (p9)

Fortunately for us – in Gordon (1925) and Gordon (1948) the author has done much to record local place-names, and knowledge of the Cairngorms, that would otherwise be lost.

For example, – in Gordon (1925) the author gives name to the two moraines of Glen Lui just upriver from Black Bridge – Da Shithean – Two Fairy Mounds.

Black Bridge - Rebuilt in 1988 by 118 Field Squadron 1 Troop and 3 Troop. Captain Michael Emsley commanding.

=== Clais Fhearniag ===
A little more than half-a-mile above Black Bridge – just before the burn named Allt a' Mhadaidh on the Ordnance Survey 1:25 000 maps – a footpath leads up the hillside, and through the narrow valley named Clais Fhearniag – The Hollow of the Alder – the track leads through Clais Fhearniag to Glen Quoich. According to Watson (1975) Clais Fhearniag was created as a result of the Ice Age – the rivers under the ice created by the melting glaciers 'cut the dry cliffed gullies so common in the region' – presumably in some kind of waterfall action. The dam at the east end is man made.

=== The Townships ===
Before the Jacobite rising of 1715 Glen Lui supported many people and the valley floor was dotted with farms and townships. Following the acquisition of the forfeited Mar Estate by James Erskine, Lord Grange and David Erskine, Lord Dun in 1724 the 'Farmers of Glen Lui were forcibly evicted in 1726' – Watson (1975).

In Gordon (1948) the author quotes from a letter dated 15 September 1726 from Lord Grange to James Farquharson of Balmoral who was Factor and Forester of the estate at the time, referring to Glen Lui and instructing him to eject those people after their harvest is over. The reason for this clearance appears to have been economic, to make timber extraction from the glen easier. In any case the glen appears to have been resettled by 1732, and finally cleared again by 1777 by which time all the tenancies in Glen Lui had reverted to the landowner – Earl Fife – Dixon and Green (1995).

Some old maps show place names in the glen, but do not fix locations accurately. To the north of the Lui Water – Roy (1747–1755) shows : Achavadie, Aldvattigally, and Rinton, and to the south : Dalgirmich, and Knockinted – showing that these place names (at least) existed in Glen Lui before 1755. Although these place names appear to be phonetic transcriptions of the Gaelic there is no great difficulty in connecting these phonetic-transcriptions with the actual place names they represent.

Similarly to the north Dixon and Green (1995) shows : Wester Auchavrie, Easter Auchavrie, Croislish, Allt a' Mhadaidh-allaidh, and Ruigh an t-Sidhein, and to the south : Dail Rosaigh, Dail Gainimh, and Cnoc na Teididh.

However – in Gordon (1925) the author gives the name of the burn as Allt a' Mhadaidh Allaidh – the Wolf's Burn, commemorating the killing of the last Wolf in the Forest of Mar. In Watson (1975) the author gives its name as Allt Mhad-allaidh and the pronunciation as like Vat Aalie.

In Gordon (1948) the author suggest the township named Aldvattigally by Roy (1747–1755), and Allt a' Mhadaidh-allaidh by Dixon and Green (1995) should be Allt a' Mhadaidh Allaidh – Burn of the Wild Dog (Wolf), and the township named Achavadie by Roy (1747–1755), and the Wester and Easter Auchavrie by Dixon and Green (1995) should be Ach' a' Mhaidaidh – Field of the Dog.

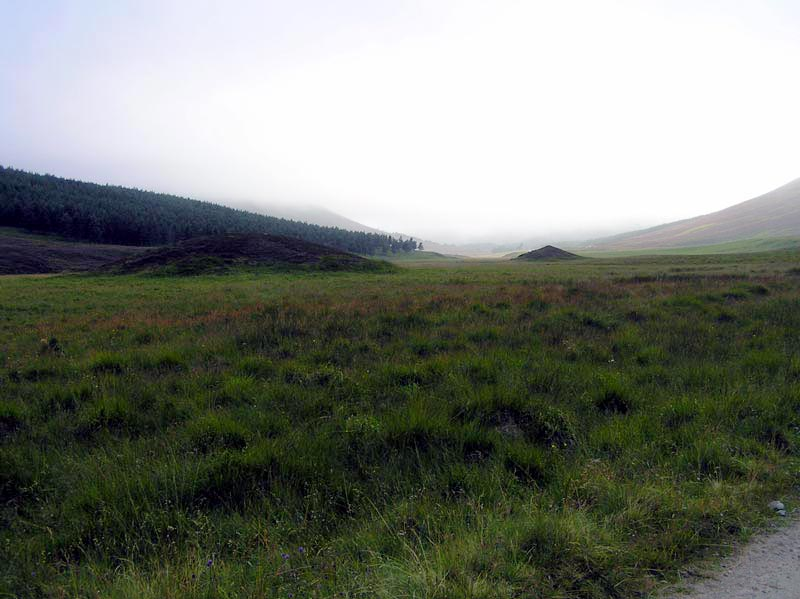
Moraines

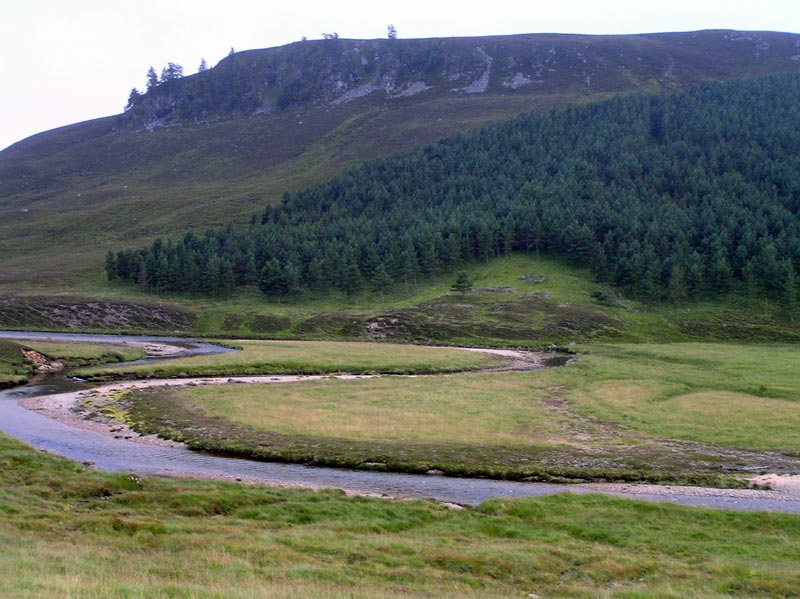
Cnoc na Teididh

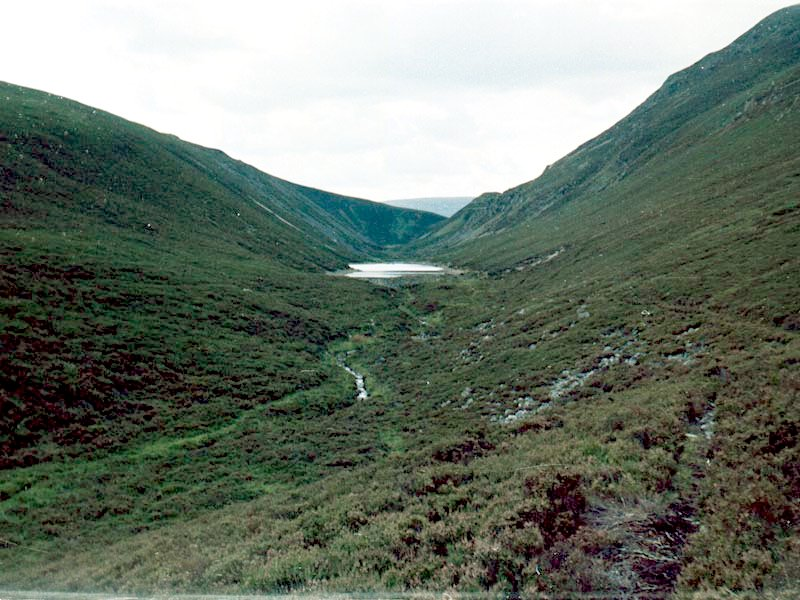
Clais Fhearniag (1970s)

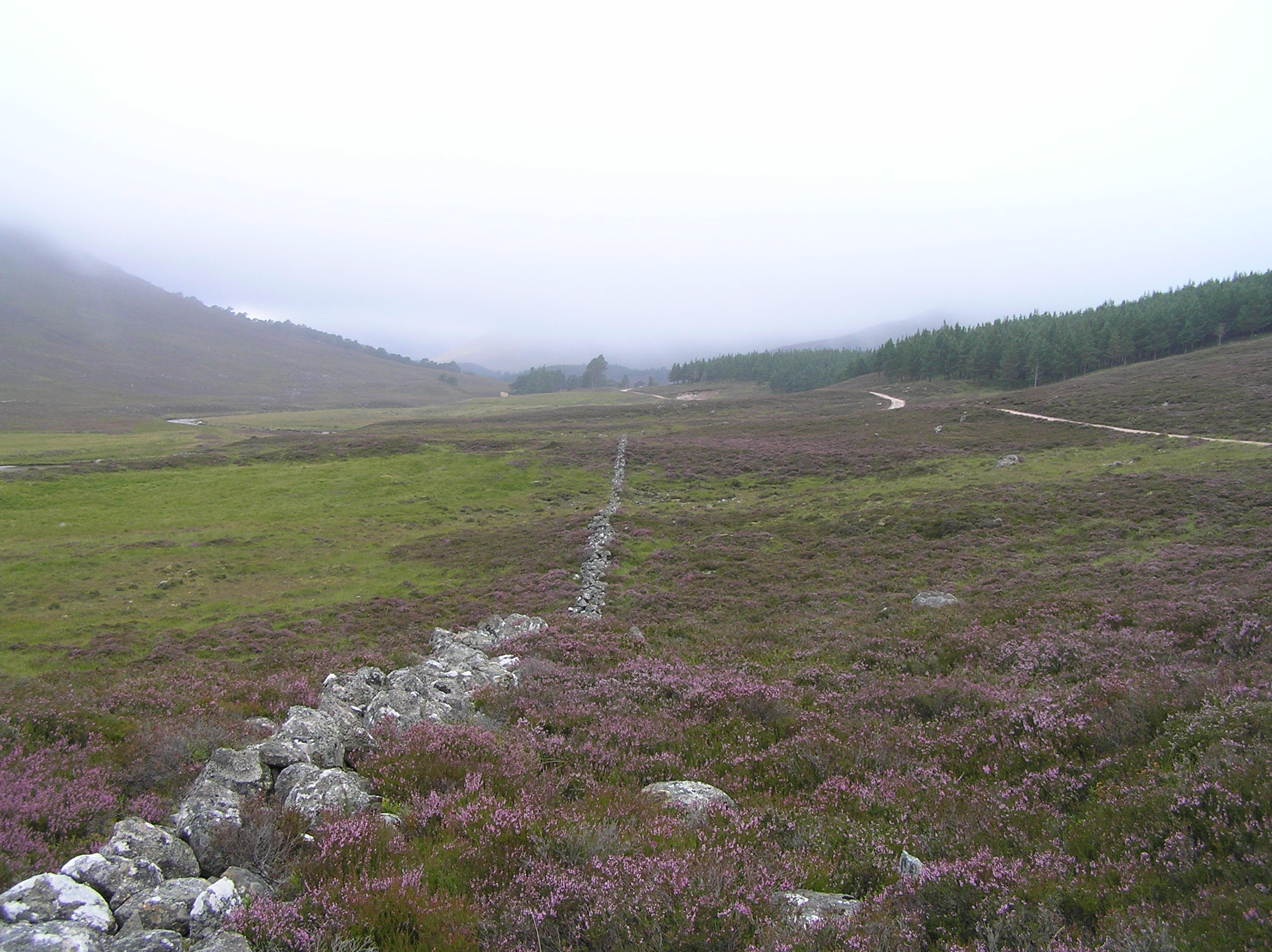
Easter Auchavrie, and Wester Auchavrie

=== Derry Wood ===
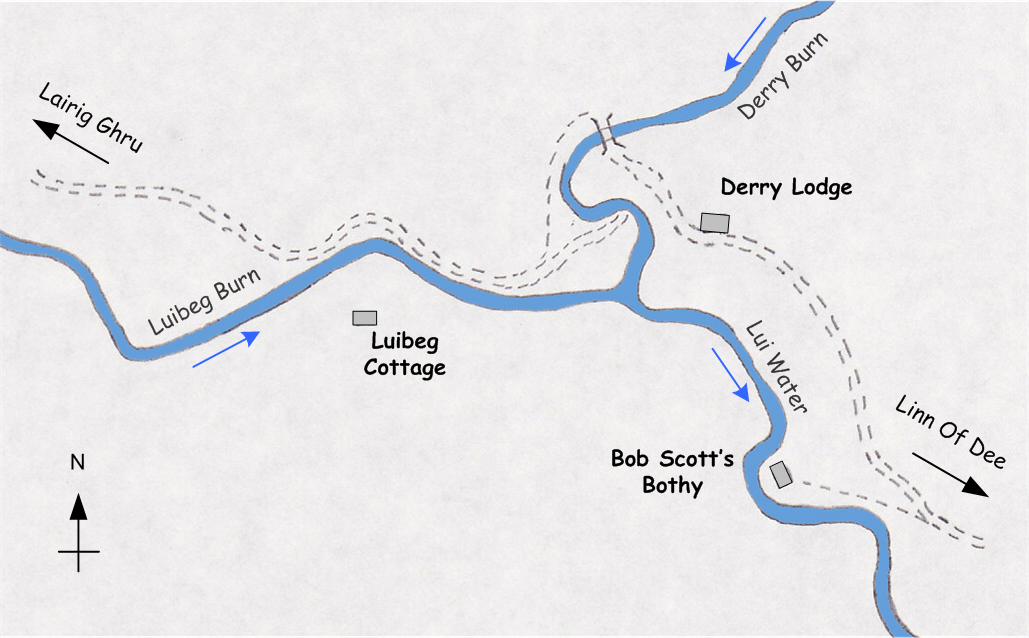
Sketch map of Derry Wood and Luibeg

The name Derry Wood (colloquially 'The Derry') is from An Doire – the grove (Watson 1975). Approaching Derry Wood from Linn of Dee – Carn Crom a spur of Derry Cairngorm is seen directly behind it.

In the Derry Wood is the old Hunting Lodge named Derry Lodge – in spite of the speculation by Dixon and Green (1995) that it was possibly the Head Keeper's house ... A building of one storey and attic, it was suitable for the person second in rank on the estate to the factor – local knowledge and existing records (Census records for example) indicate that Ronald McDonald the Head Keeper at the end of the 19th and the start of the 20th centuries lived at Claybokie – and that Derry Lodge was probably intended as temporary accommodation for hunting parties.

The routes through Derry Wood can be confusing – especially when trying to follow a map. Arriving from the direction of Linn of Dee – the four-wheel drive road leading SW to the Lui Water does not lead to a bridge. Just beyond Derry Lodge another four-wheel drive road leading SW to the Derry Burn does not lead to a bridge either – it once did continuing over the Luibeg Burn towards Luibeg Cottage where Bob Scott lived for many years.

To continue – straight on – past Derry Lodge crossing Derry Burn by the footbridge and (roughly W) staying close to the North bank of the Luibeg Burn until picking up the four-wheel drive road again.

On the West bank of the Derry Burn – a (roughly N) route leads up Glen Derry to Lairig an Laoigh.

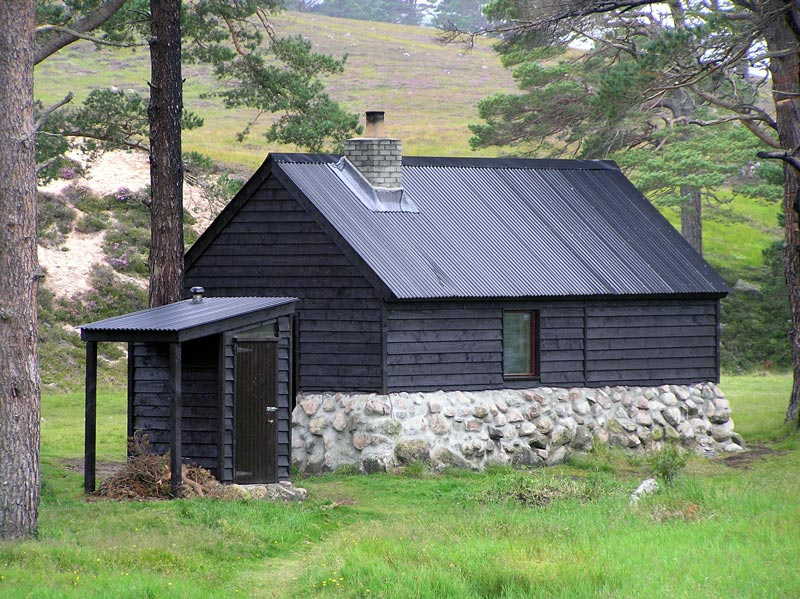
Bob Scott's Bothy (MK3)

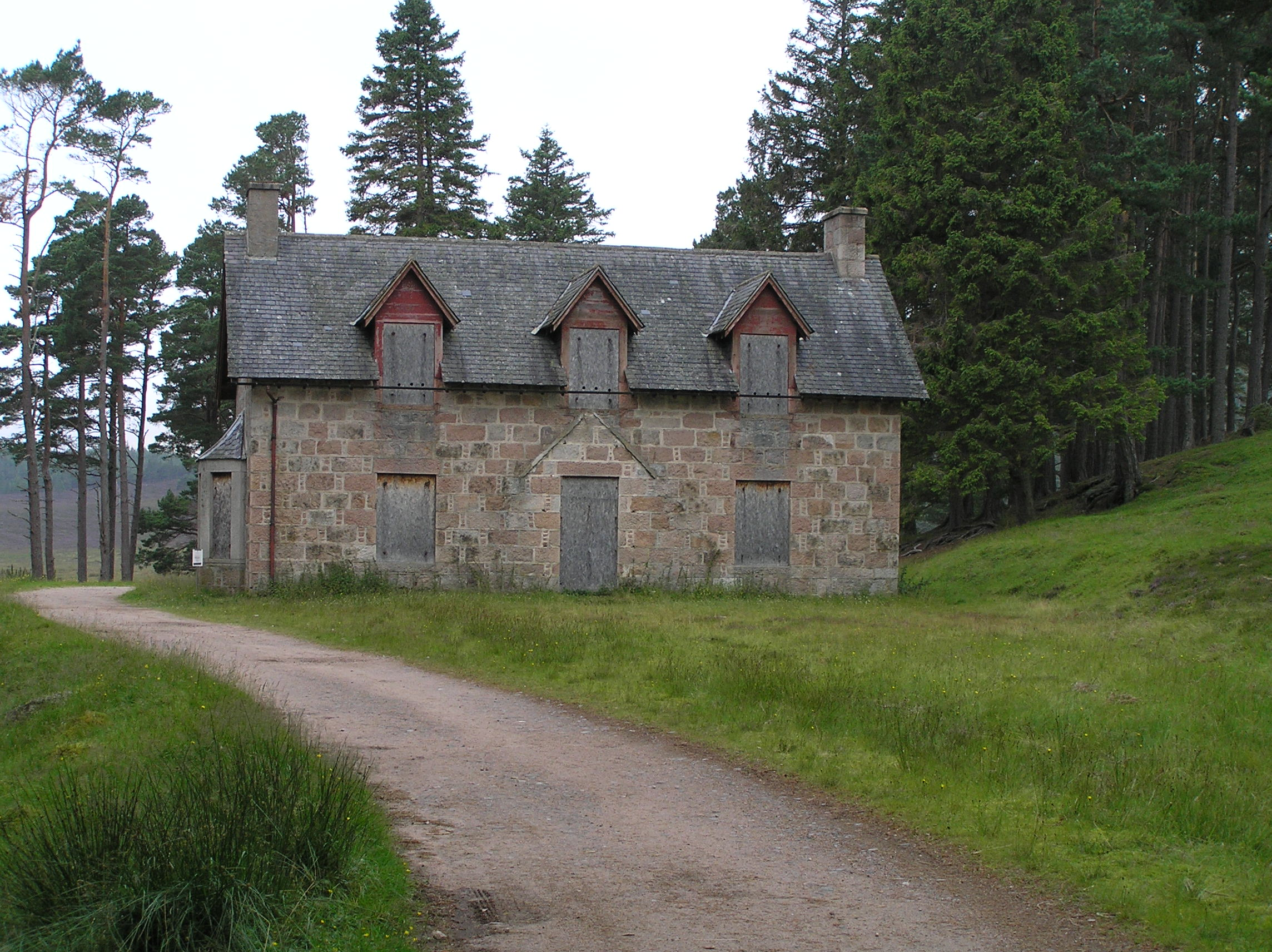
Derry Lodge

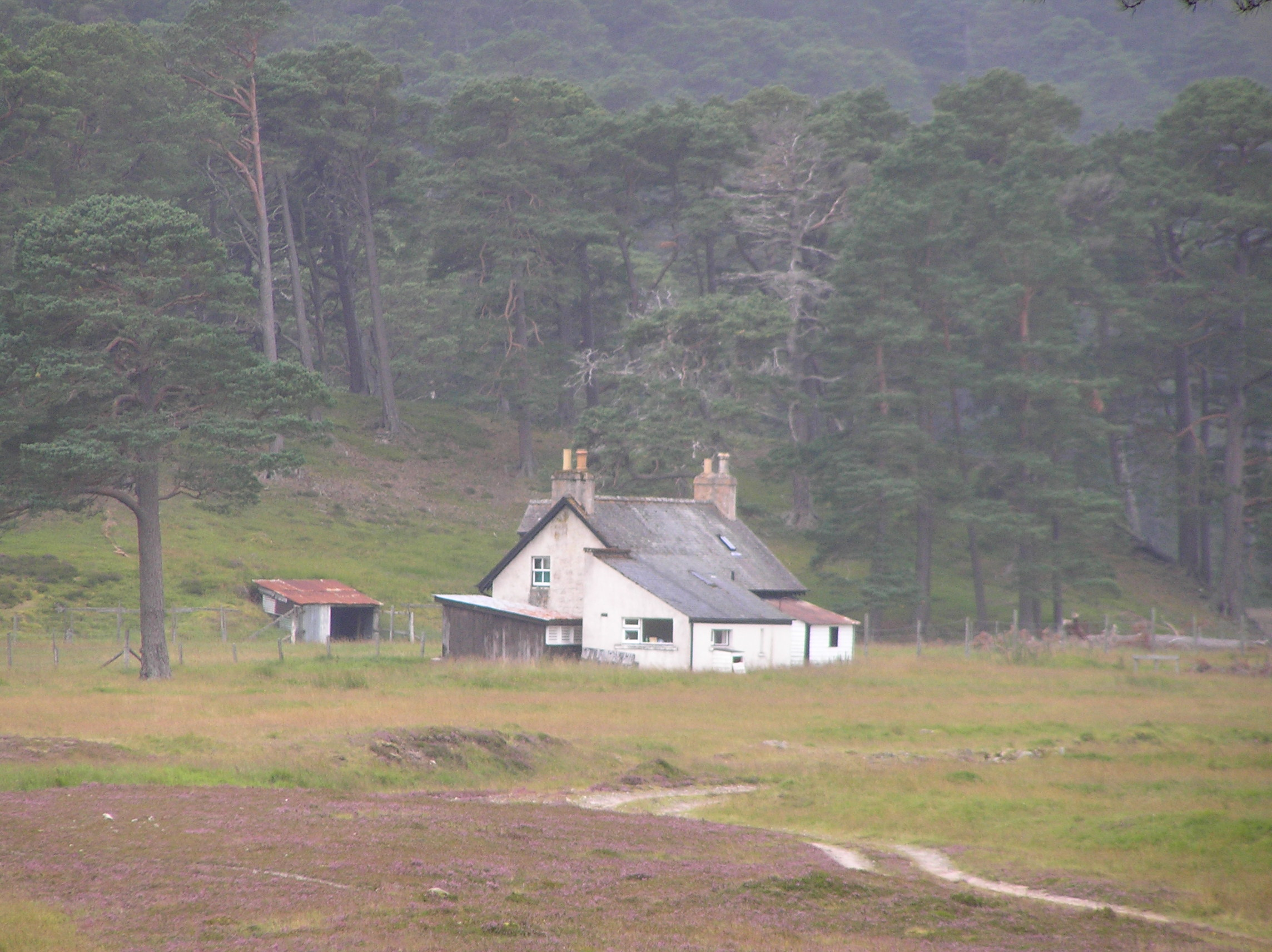
Luibeg Cottage

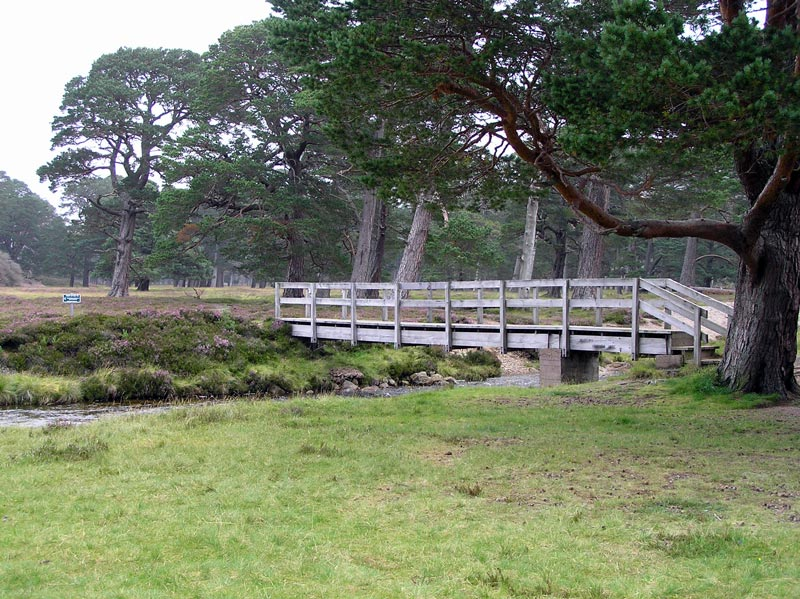
Derry Burn footbridge

== Derry Wood to Glen Dee ==
=== Glen Luibeg ===
Glen Luibeg starts – perhaps – at the confluence of Derry Burn with Lui Water. If so – Luibeg Burn starts at this point too. From here the route is in Glen Luibeg along the northern bank of Luibeg Burn. The four-wheel drive road used to cross the bridge at Derry Lodge pass Luibeg Cottage then crossing Luibeg Burn and leading all the way to Preas nam Meirleach – Robber's Copse : Watson (1975). The route from Luibeg has recently been improved and narrowed, and is no longer regularly driven over by vehicles.

=== Coire Craobh an Oir ===
Just west of Luibeg on the south facing slope of Carn Crom is the shallow corrie named Coire Craobh an Oir – corrie of the tree of gold : Watson (1975). The legend attached to the name reported in (among others) Gordon (1925) and Watson (1975) relates to one of the Mackenzies who held Dalmore – the name of the building and locality where the present Mar Lodge stands. Generations of Mackenzies were feudal-holders of Dalmore under the Earls of Mar until Mar Lodge Estate was forfeited in 1716. In Gordon (1925) the author reports that [some] Mackenzie of Dalmore buried his treasure from a raid in Lochaber beside this tree for a while, before moving it to Cairn Geldie – where it remains to this day.

=== Preas nam Meirleach ===
At Preas nam Meirleach the Luibeg Burn cuts across the footpath forcing a fording or detour upstream to the Luibeg Bridge. The older 7th series Ordnance Survey maps do not show the detour because and earlier bridge spanned the Luibeg Burn here – it was destroyed by a flood, remnants of it can still be seen in the burn near the ford. In Alexander (1928) the author mentions a usable foot bridge being here.

From Preas nam Meirleach the route continues around the base of Carn a' Mhaim (roughly W) becoming (roughly N) as it approach the junction with the River Dee Route, Corrour Bothy and the Lairig Ghru itself.

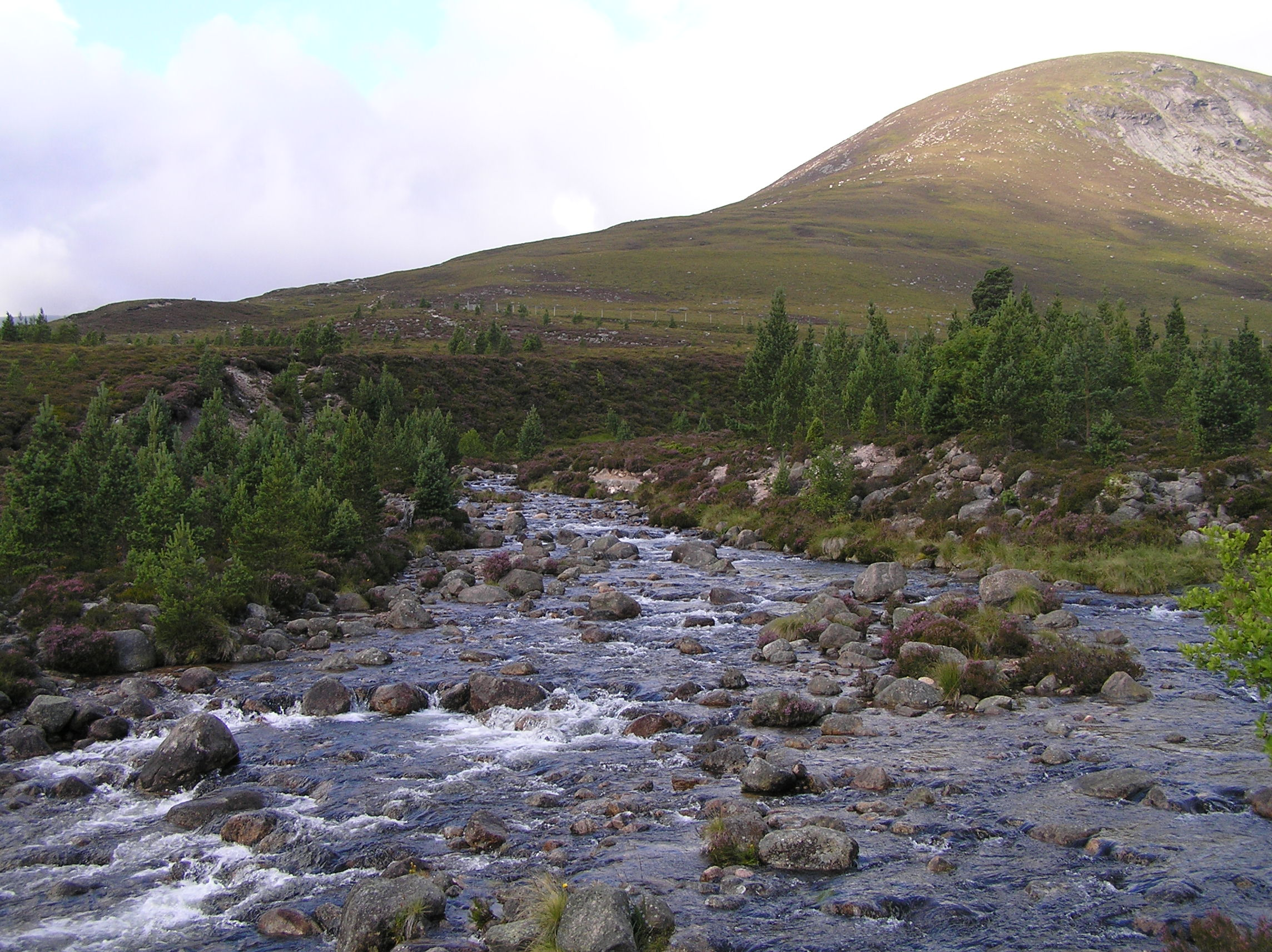
The Luibeg Burn at the Robber's Copse

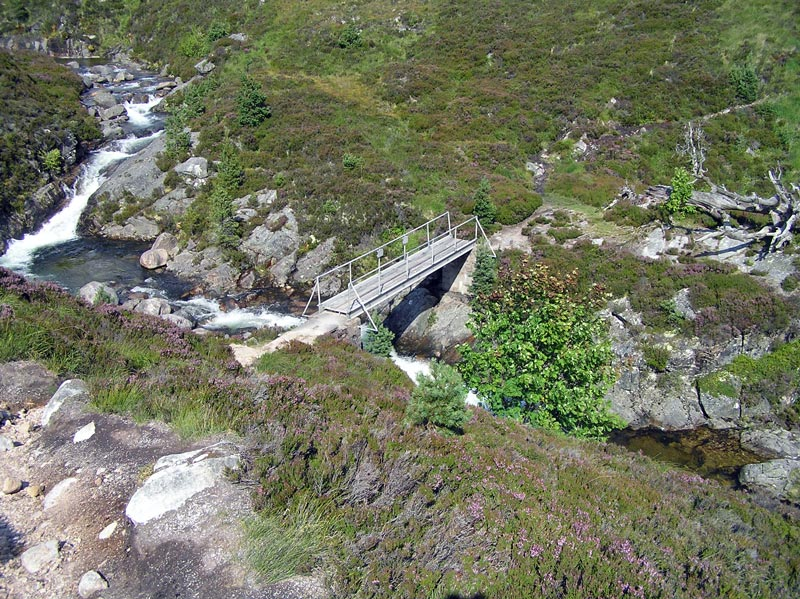
The footbridge over the Luibeg Burn upstream from the Robber's Copse

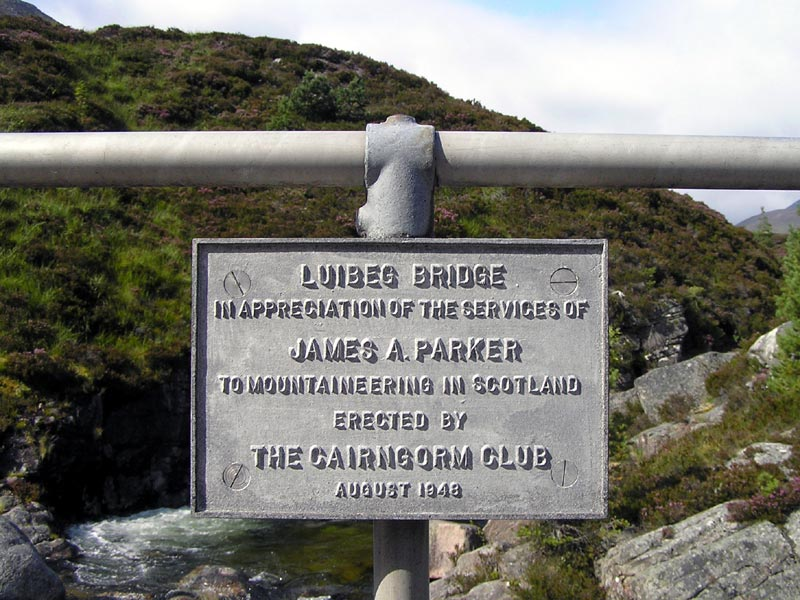
The plaque on the footbridge over the Luibeg Burn

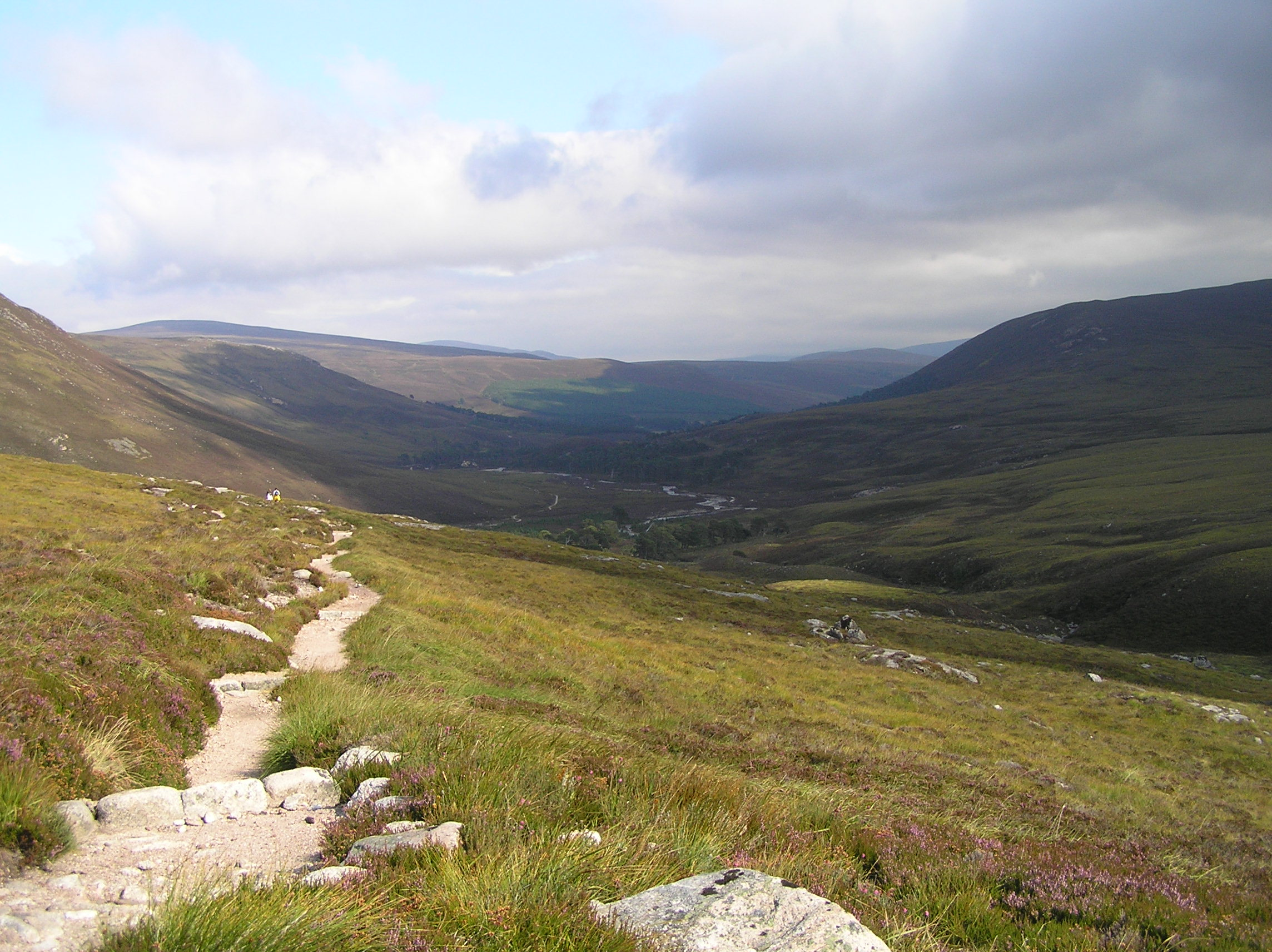
Looking back towards the Robber's Copse and Glen Luibeg

== Sources ==
- Alexander, Henry (1928). The Cairngorms. Edinburgh: The Scottish Mountaineering Club.
- Dixon, P.J.; Green, S.T. (1995), Mar Lodge Estate Grampian : An Archaeological Survey, Royal Commission on the Ancient and Historical Monuments of Scotland, Edinburgh
- Gordon, Seton (1925). The Cairngorm Hills of Scotland. London, England.: Cassell and Company.
- Gordon, Seton (1948), Highways and Byways in the Central Highlands, MacMillan & Co. Ltd, London, England.
- Roy, William (1747–1755), Military Survey of Scotland, MS (British Museum)
- Watson, Adam (1975). The Cairngorms. Edinburgh: The Scottish Mountaineering Trust.
- Wyness, Fenton (1968), Royal Valley : The Story Of The Aberdeenshire Dee, Alex P. Reid & Son, Aberdeen
