= Lairig Ghru =

Mountain pass in the Cairngorms, Scotland, UK

Coordinates: 57°5′27″N 3°41′38″W

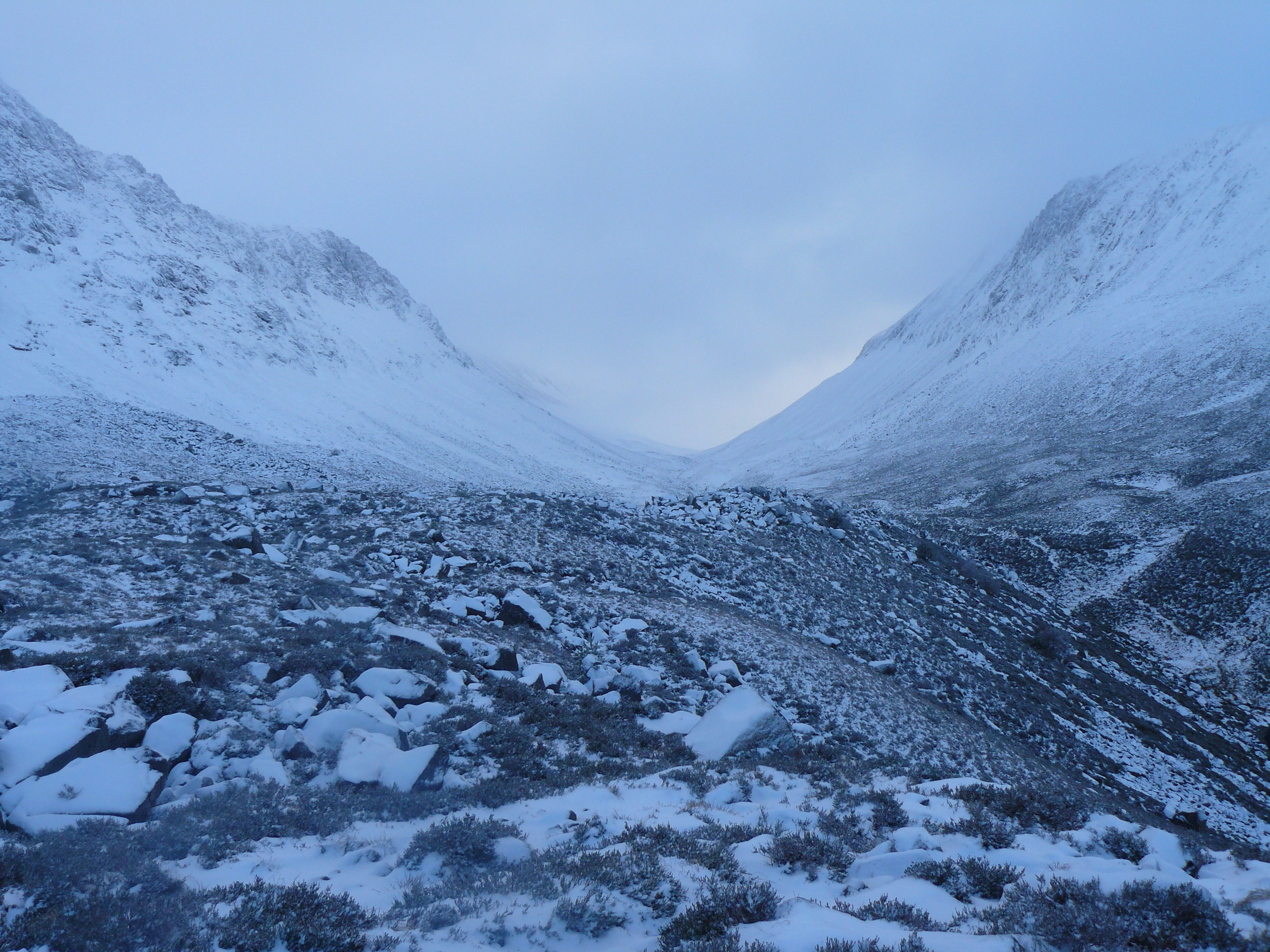
The northern entrance to the Lairig Ghru, with Lurcher's Crag (left) and Braeriach (right)

Lairig Ghru and Lairig an Laoigh

The Lairig Ghru (Scottish Gaelic: Làirig Dhrù) is one of the mountain passes through the Cairngorms of Scotland. The route and mountain pass partially lies on the Mar Lodge Estate.

Like many traditional routes, the ends of the route through the Lairig Ghru are like the ends of a frayed rope. From the south the Lairig Ghru can be approached from Braemar through Glen Lui, or Glen Dee, and from Blair Atholl through Glen Tilt. From the north the Lairig Ghru can be approached from Glenmore through the Chalamain Gap, and from Aviemore through the Rothiemurchus Forest by way of the Crossroads above Allt Drùidh.

== Name ==
Watson gives the place name "Làirig Dhrù", meaning pass of Dhru or Druie, with the local pronunciation "Laarig Groo". He suggests the "probable" derivation as from Drùdhadh meaning oozing. Any visitor to the summit of the Lairig Ghru would accept that as a possible derivation because two watercourses, one on each side of the summit, appear to "ooze" from the valley floor.

However, Gordon is much less certain about the derivation of the name, writing:

As a place-name Lairig Ghru remains an enigma. Lairig means hill pass, and map-makers of the nineteenth century solved the problem to their own satisfaction by substituting for Ghru the word Ghruamach, for which they had apparently not the slightest authority. Ghruamach means forbidding or surly, and forbidding the Lairig often is in wild weather ... But authorities on place-names reject these suggestions, and are obliged to leave the name Ghru a mystery, although it seems to contain the same root as the Allt Dhru burn which drains it to the north. MacBain a distinguished philologist, writes that the name is "probably the Pass of Druie river, from root dru, flow, as in Gaulish Druentia"

— Gordon (1948) (p308)

The weight of suggestion is - therefore - that Lairig Ghru is certainly the hill pass (of something) and that something is probably related to the water flowing from the floor of the valley close to the summit.

Many Gaelic place names have lost their original spelling and meaning through translation into English. The prolific and late Dundonian mountaineer, Syd Scroggie felt that the name Lairig Ghru was such a case and suggested that the Lairig Ghru was the Lairig Ruadh (Red Pass). This fits with the original name of the mountain range, "Am Monadh Ruadh" (The Red Mountains).

== History ==
Historically the Lairig Ghru has been used simply as a route between Deeside and Strathspey. It is often referred to as a drove road, and while it's not wrong to do so, arguably that over-emphasises one specific use. The Lairig Ghru has been a route used by many different people, for many different purposes as made clear in Haldane (1952), and was in regular use long before the height of the droving trade in the more peaceful times after the middle of the 18th century:

The natural barrier of hills which stand round the head waters of the two rivers [the Dee and Don] was thus less of a protection than a source of danger, and it was over paths trodden by centuries of raiding traffic that, when more peaceful times came, the drovers of north-east Scotland passed on their way to the trysts and their lawful occasions

— Haldane (1952) (p115)

The Lairig Ghru was used as a droving-route as late as 1873 - Haldane (1952) - to Braemar and farther south. Until approximately the 1870s, men from Rothiemurchus annually, in the spring, cleared the track of rocks that had fallen on to it during the winter.

Modern road traffic now travels over the Pass of Drumochter via the A9 or The Lecht on the A939, and the Lairig Ghru is left to walkers.

The full route from Aviemore to Braemar is about 43 km (27 mi), though many walkers cut the walk short by starting or finishing at Linn of Dee. The 8 km (5.0 mi) from there to Braemar is along a tarmac road.

== Recreational use ==
Although the Lairig Ghru has long been used by travellers to get between Strathspey and Deeside, it has also been used recreationally since at least the early twentieth century. Anderson (1911) writes:

In the days before railways it was much used as a means of intercommunication, particularly for the driving of cattle from all the Highlands around to the great southern "trysts" or fairs; but now the pass is seldom traversed except by gillies and foresters, or by pedestrians ambitious to add the feat of "doing" it to their "record".

— Anderson (1911)

An even earlier recreational mention is a report on the snow conditions in the Lairig Ghru by C. G. Cash in April 1901:

On the 17th I went up the Lairig Ghru [from Rothiemurchus] as far as the watershed. Here I reached snow at the 1750 [feet] contour, and found it much greater in quantity than I have previously seen it. After the first half-mile I found it unbroken, except for a narrow strip along the edge of the ridge usually occupied by the intermittent track. The snow was in capital walking condition, but seemingly I was the first person to go up the pass. At the watershed the depth of the snow must have been great, for a notable ridge of rocks crossing the pass just at the watershed was buried, and the large cairns in its neighbourhood were invisible. Indeed I barely found enough exposed rock to serve as a dry seat, while I took a rest, a lunch, and a look at the Deeside view

— C. G. Cash - Cairngorm Club Journal 17, July 1901 (p 313-314)

This snow report by C. G. Cash implies both his own and his readers' familiarity with the Lairig Ghru.

== Waypoints (from the south) ==
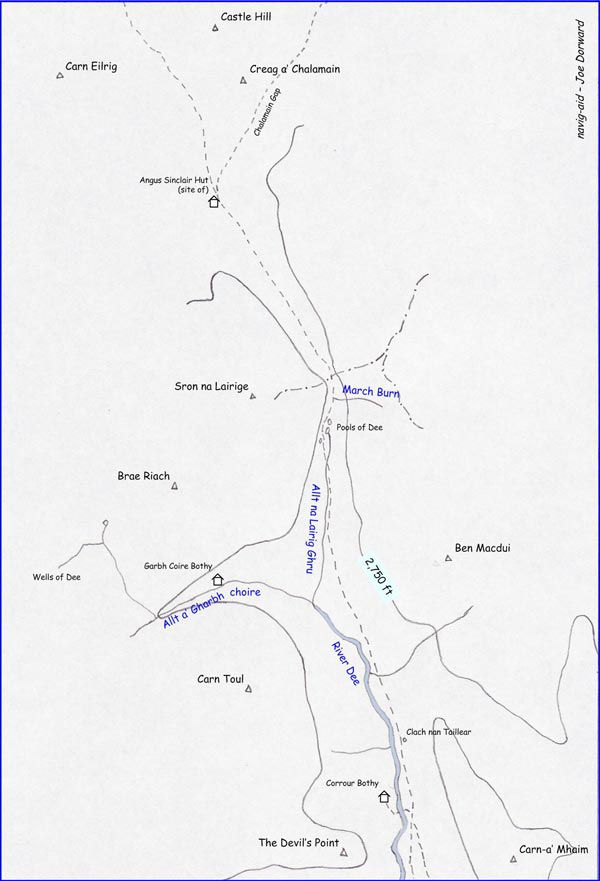

There are many waypoints and features in the Lairig Ghru which, because of map scale, do not appear on the old 1-inch, nor 1:50,000 scale maps. Others only exist in older books Gordon (1925), Watson (1975) - for example - because the authors, acquainted with local people and traditions, have described these features and recorded their names.

There is no objective measure of where the ends of the Lairig Ghru are. Gordon defines "Lairig" as a "Hill Pass". In that case, the landscape is arguably too open for the "ends" of the Lairig's track to extend much beyond the imaginary lines drawn between the summits of Carn a' Mhaim and The Devil's Point at the southern end, and Carn Eilrig and Castle Hill at the northern end.

From the south, the two main approaches to the Lairig Ghru follow the Glen Lui Route or the Glen Dee Route. These two routes come together soon after crossing the imaginary line between Carn a' Mhaim and The Devil's Point, creating the first waypoint. Soon after this coming together, the track splits again with the left-hand (roughly NW) branch leading to the Cairngorm Club footbridge across the River Dee towards Corrour Bothy and the mountains to the west of the Lairig Ghru.

=== Corrour Bothy ===
Corrour Bothy is a simple stone building below Coire Odhar, which lies between The Devil's Point and Cairn Toul on the western side of the river. It is now used as a mountain refuge and maintained by the Mountain Bothies Association. The single room has a fireplace and chimney in its northern gable, there is also an outer composting toilet facility in its own room.

=== Clach nan Taillear ===
Literally "stone of the tailors" (Watson (1975)) is a large ribbed stone by the side of the Lairig Ghru track close to where the Allt Coire an t-Saighdeir joins the river.

Gordon describes how this stone got its name, writing:

...Tailor's Stone, named after certain tailors who for a wager attempted to dance, during the hours of a winter day, at the "three Dells" - the Dell of Abernethy, the Dell of Rothiemurchus and Dalmore in Mar. They danced at Abernethy and at Rothiemurchus and had crossed the most exposed miles of the Lairig when a blizzard overtook them in Glen Dee, and they succumbed as they vainly sought shelter behind the stone that is their memorial

— Gordon (1948) (page 316)

=== River Dee ===
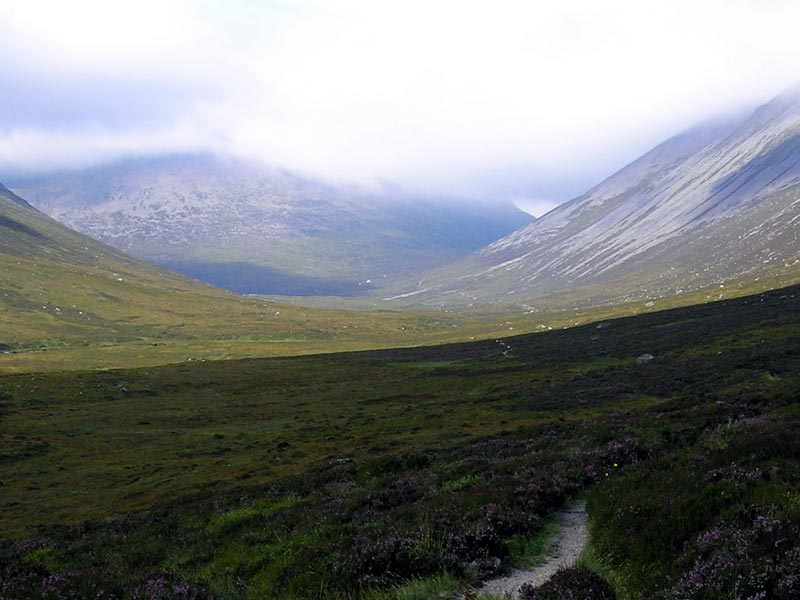
From Corrour, roughly N towards the head of Glen Dee and the hanging valley

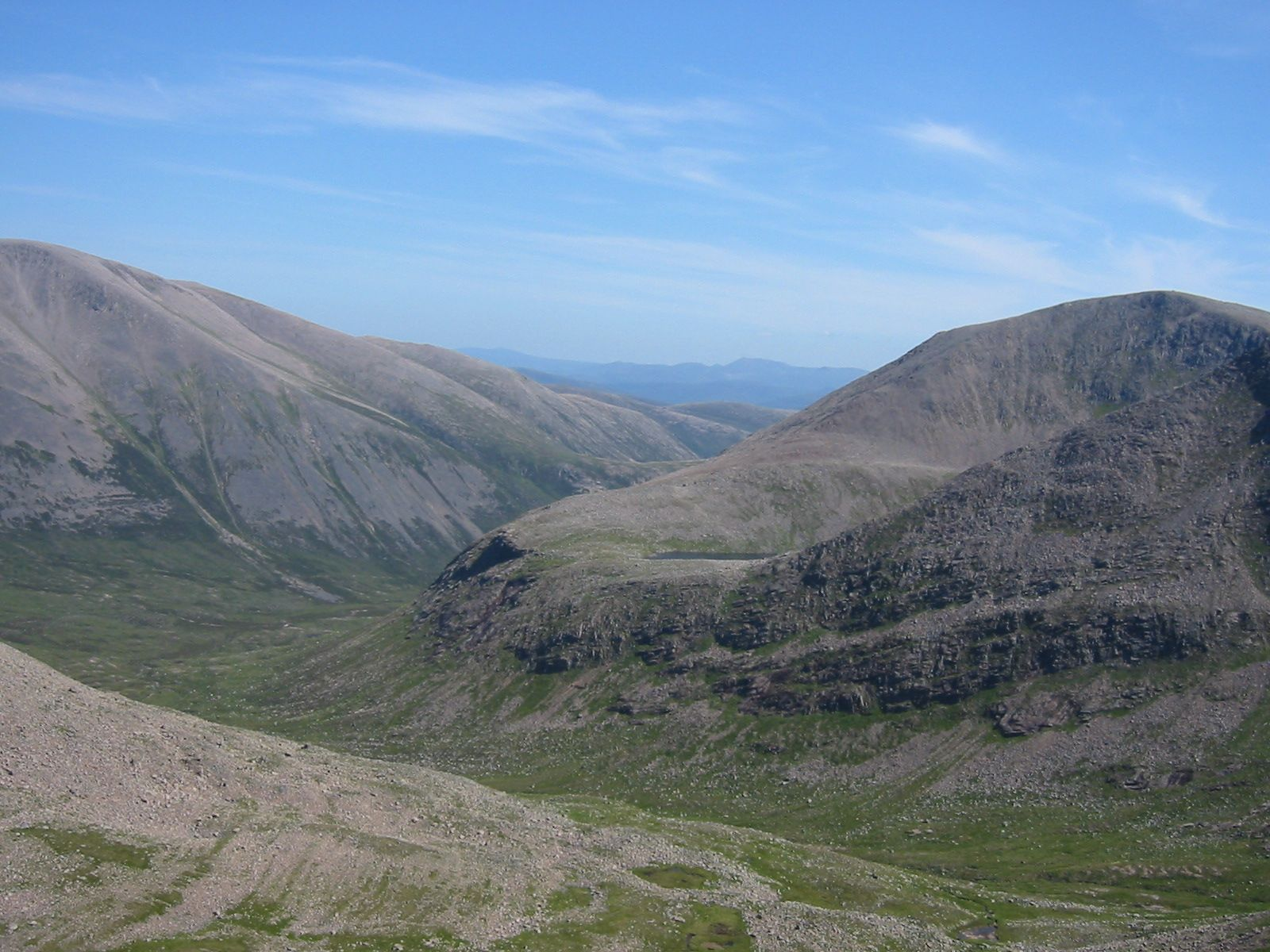
From Braeriach, roughly SW towards the head of Glen Dee

All the rain that falls on the slopes at either side of the southern half of the Lairig Ghru eventually drains into the River Dee, and the "official" source of the River Dee, the Wells of Dee, is high on Braeriach. However the River Dee (as a named watercourse on maps) starts at the confluence of Allt a' Gharbh choirie and Allt na Lairig Ghru. At this point, near the head of Glen Dee, the main valley turns roughly west towards An Garbh Choire, and the Lairig Ghru track continues northward into the hanging valley as shown in the photograph.

=== The Duke's Path ===
Only shown on the 1:25,000 scale maps, The Duke's Path is a made-path on the western side of the Lairig Ghru, following the course of the burn draining Coire Ruadh and leading to the bealach between Braeriach and Sron na Lairige.

During the nineteenth century, what was then the Mar Estate (see Mar Lodge Estate) was a private hunting estate owned by the Duke of Fife (created Duke in 1889, and dying in 1912). In Gordon (1925) the author describes using this path on an ascent of Braeriach, continuing:

It is (1925) some thirty years since the late Duke of Fife constructed it, but as the corrie is one of the most outlying of all in the wide Forest of Mar the path has scarcely been used since the day it was made and is now difficult to follow, except near the top of the corrie

— Gordon (1925) (p 108)

=== Pools of Dee ===
The Lairig Ghru track winds around a series of pools on the Mar side of the summit. These are thought by many (incorrectly) to be the source of the River Dee. Watson (1975) explains that the Pools of Dee are an invention rather than a pure Anglicisation of the old name Lochan Dubh na Lairige (black tarn of the Lairig). At least one of these pools is reputed to contain trout in spite of these pools having no obvious outflow, nor inflow.

Slightly to the south of the largest pool, the burn named Allt na Lairig Ghru flows from the floor of the valley flowing south to join with the burn named Allt a' Gharbh choirie to create the River Dee proper.

=== March Burn ===
The March Burn is a burn on the Mar side of the summit, draining the eastern-slope above it and disappearing below the rocks before it reaches the floor of the valley. Gordon (1925) describes it as falling in a white spray to the Lairig from the northern spur of Ben Mac Dhui.

"March has nothing to do with the month of the year, but refers to the old use of the word meaning boundary. The summit of the Lairig Ghru marks the boundary between Deeside (Aberdeenshire) and Strathspey (Inverness-shire). Watson (1975) gives the old name of Allt na Criche (the burn of the boundary), giving the local pronunciation as Creech."

=== Summit ===
Watson gives the summit height as about 835 metres (2,740 ft), and the Cairngorm Tourist Map (1975) gives a spot-height of 2,733 feet.

=== Angus Sinclair Memorial Hut ===
Plaque now attached to a rock marking the site of the Sinclair Memorial Hut

A bothy was built in 1957 by members of the Edinburgh University OTC as a memorial to Dr William Angus Sinclair FRSE, who died on Cairn Gorm on 21 December 1954. The refuge was located near the cross-roads where the tracks from Sron na Lairige and the Chalamain Gap cross the Lairig Ghru. Like many other man-made shelters in the mountains of Scotland that were very accessible from public roads, it was demolished and removed in about 1991.

=== Chalamain Gap ===
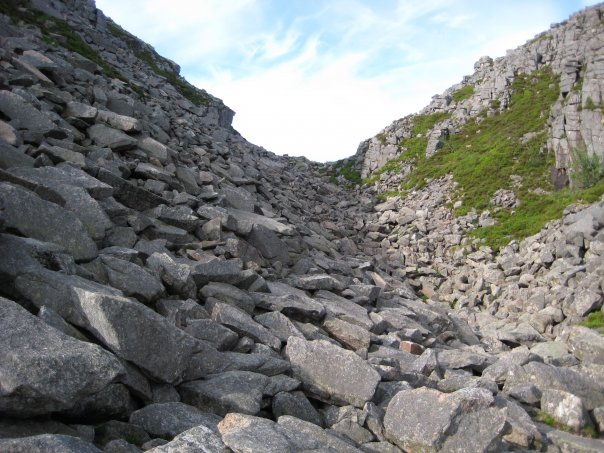
View of The Chalamain Gap

This boulder-strewn ravine is used as a route between the Lairig Ghru and Glen More. The name "Chalamain Gap" has been applied relatively recently to this ravine, since in Alexander (1928) the author does not name the gap, but describes it - writing:

a fine example of the "dry dens" or ravines which are found at various points on the Cairngorms, and which are supposed to have formed by glacier overflows or side streams

— Alexander (1928) (p 121)

Watson does not name the ravine "Chalamain Gap" either, but refers to it as the location of the Sinclair Hut:

an alternative path to this spot comes in on the left [north-east] from Glen More. It leads through a rocky gap SE of Creag a' Chalamain, named Eag Coire a' Chomhlaich

— Watson (1975) (p129)

More recently, Diack (2006) gives the name as Eag Coire na Comhdhalack {The Ravine of the Corrie of the Assembly}.

== Sources ==
- Alexander, Henry (1928). The Cairngorms. Edinburgh: The Scottish Mountaineering Club.
- Anderson, Robert (1911), Deeside, Adam & Charles Black, 4 Soho Square, London
- Cash, C. G. (July 1901). "A Day on Braeriach" (PDF). Cairngorm Club Journal (17). Aberdeen: Cairngorm Club.
- Diack, Dr. Alison M.G.; Dr. James H. Grant (2006), Place-Names of the Cairngorms National Park (PDF), Cairngorms National Park Authority, archived from the original (PDF) on 3 March 2016
- Gordon, Seton (1925). The Cairngorm Hills Of Scotland. London, England.: Cassell and Company.
- Gordon, Seton (1948), Highways and Byways in the Central Highlands, MacMillan & Co. Ltd, London, England.
- Haldane, A. (1952), The Drove Roads Of Scotland, Thomas Nelson and Sons, Edinburgh, Scotland.
- Watson, Adam (1975). The Cairngorms. Edinburgh: The Scottish Mountaineering Trust.

== See also ==
- Places, place names, and structures on Mar Lodge Estate
- Lairig Ghru is the location of 1976 BBC show : "BIG JIM's Big BOOZY Bike Trip to Braemar"
