= Robert Lippe =

Robert Lippe (18 June 1833 – 28 January 1913) was a Scottish minister mainly serving as chaplain to public services in Aberdeen. He is chiefly remembered as an archaeologist and mountaineer, notably founding the Cairngorm Club in 1887.

== Life ==
He was born in Kennethmont in Aberdeenshire on 18 June 1833 the eldest son of Robert Lippe, a mill-wright.

He studied Divinity at Marischal College in Aberdeen 1851 to 1856, graduating MA. In 1862 he became a schoolteacher in the village of Forgue where he continued until 1879. During this period (in 1868) he was licensed to preach by the Presbytery of Turriff on behalf of the Church of Scotland, but failed to find a position.

In 1879 he obtained a joint appointment as Chaplain to both Aberdeen Royal Infirmary and Aberdeen Lunatic Asylum. He then lived at 28 Argyll Place in Aberdeen.

He was a member of the New Spalding Club and a founder of the Cairngorm Club and was its first Vice President.

Aberdeen University awarded him an honorary doctorate (LLD) in 1895.

He died on 28 January 1913.

== Family ==
In December 1862 he married Mary McCondach (d.1903) daughter of John McCondach, a builder. Their daughter Mary Lippe became Principal of Queen's Gate School in Aberdeen. His son Charles Lippe (1868-1919) became an advocate.

== Publications ==
- Missale Romanum Mediolani
- A Historical Sketch of the Cairngorm Club (1894)
- Selections from Wodrow's Biographical Collections (1890)
