= Cairngorm Club =

Scottish mountaineering club

The Cairngorm Club is a mountaineering club, based in Aberdeen, Scotland formed in June 1887.

== History ==
The Cairngorm Club was founded by Alexander Copland, Rev. Robert Lippe, Alexander Inkson M'Connochie, Rev. C. C. Macdonald, W. A. Hawes, and W. Anderson at Clach Dhion - the Shelter Stone, above Loch A'an in the Cairngorms on 24 June 1887. The date of formation is given as 1889 in the SMC District Guide, and corrected in a later edition. The founders had climbed Ben Macdui and let off fireworks to celebrate the Queen's Jubilee. The first formal meeting was held in Aberdeen on 9 January 1889, re-appointing the office-bearers and forming a committee. The first meet was held on 9 July 1889, staying at Nethy Bridge Hotel and ascending Cairn Gorm and Ben Macdui from Glenmore Lodge.

Reverend Lippe served as the first Vice President.

The club was registered as a charity on 11 July 2017. The current President (2022) is Garry Wardrope, aged 60.

== Club huts ==
=== Derry Lodge ===
The club leased Derry Lodge from Mar Lodge Estate from 1951 until 1967. Now empty, the Lodge still lies at the confluence of the Derry and Luibeg burns, at the end of a private road. The Lodge had been requisitioned by the army in 1942 and had lain empty since the army left in 1944. There was no significant structural damage. It was furnished to accommodate 24 people and was comfortable during the summer months. In winter, the water system had to be drained and the back scullery was draughty and let in snow. After agreeing that the lease would continue until 1966, the club replaced the corrugated iron scullery and rear passageway in 1955. In 1966, the lease was renewed, with rent increased from £25 to £100 pa and only every year. This made it uneconomic to spend further money on the building and the club gave up the lease in 1967. The Lodge has been unoccupied since. NTS submitted a plan to convert the building into a 20-bedroom hostel with space for two staff, retaining its lounge and dining rooms.

=== Muir Cottage ===
While negotiating for Derry Lodge, the club was offered a lease on Muir Cottage as a club hut from June 1950. Known as Muir of Inverey, it is located west of Braemar, on the north side of the Linn of Dee road. The accommodation initially consisted of a combined kitchen and sitting room, and beds for 12 in three bedrooms, two in adjacent wooden annexes. A lean-to was built, adding a scullery and washroom.

After purchasing the building, a timber extension was constructed in 1972, with four dormitories sleeping a total of 18, two toilets with showers, and a separate small sitting room. The small sitting room is now a members' room.

The hut is bookable for use by members of recognised hillwalking and climbing clubs throughout the year.

== Cairngorm Club Journal ==
The club has published a journal (CCJ) since 1893. The editor for the first 36 issues was Alexander Inkson McConnochie. As well as notes on the activities of the club, each issue contains a variety of articles, many with a focus on the Cairngorms. All issues have been digitised and are available on-line. The latest issue, Volume 23, Number 114, was produced in 2022. Articles in the early volumes include:

=== Volume I ===
- The Flowering Plants and Ferns of the Cairngorms - Prof. J. W. H. Trail
- The Eastern Cairngorms - A. I. McConnochie
- The Central Cairngorms - A. I. McConnochie
- Outlying Nooks of Cairngorm - Rev. W. Forsyth

=== Volume II ===
- The Western Cairngorms - A. I. McConnochie
- The Braemar Highlands after the '45
- The Mountains of Scotland over 2000 feet: The Cairngorms - C. G. Cash
- Outlying Nooks of Cairngorm - Rev. W. Forsyth
- Outline View of the Cairngorms from Aviemore - C. G. Cash

=== Volume III ===
- The Torridon Hills - W. Brown
- A Hillwalk in Norway - J. Geddie
- Outlying Nooks of Cairngorm - Rev. W. Forsyth
- Mount Battock and Clochnaben (sic) - R. Anderson
- Arthur's Seat - C. G. Cash
- Mountain Measurements - J. C. Barnett
- An Arctic Summer Day on Cairntoul - J. Gordon

== Projects ==
The club has funded a variety of projects in the Cairngorms.

=== Summit indicators ===
- Lochnagar (1924)
- Ben Macdui (1925)

=== Bridges ===
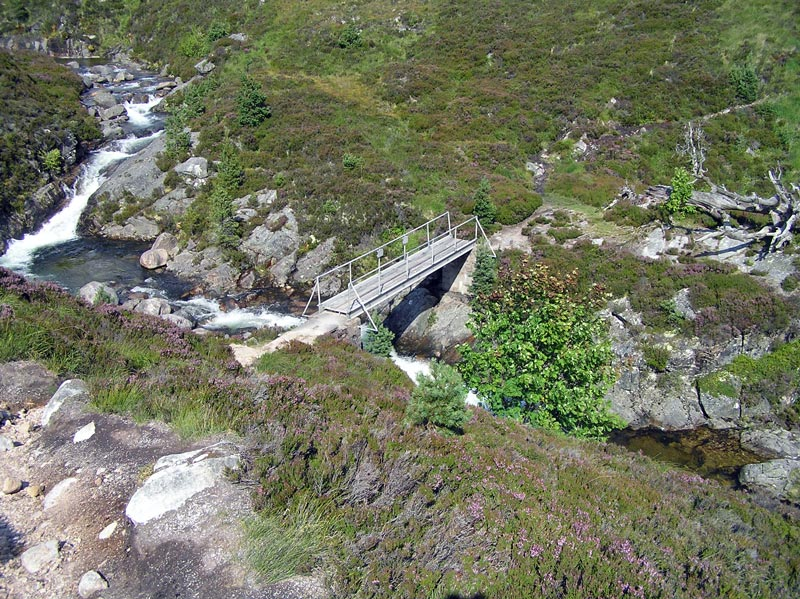
Footbridge over Luibeg Burn

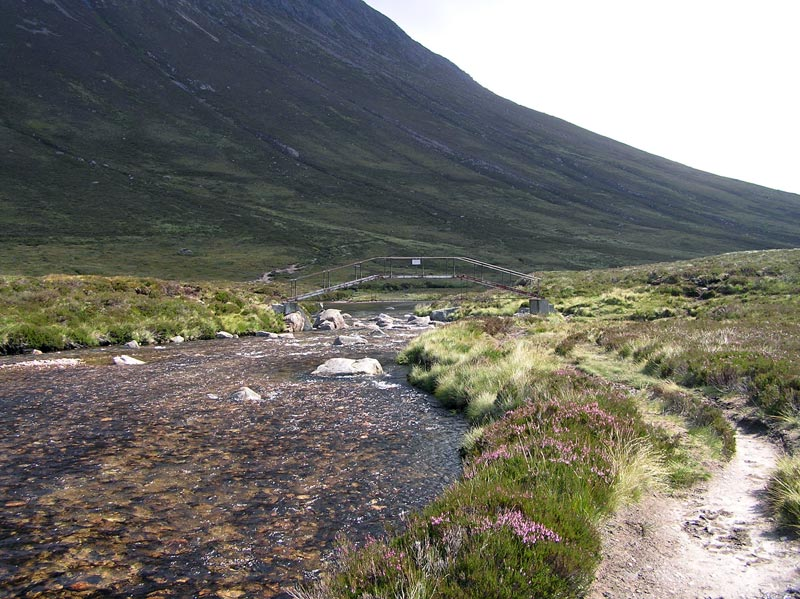
Footbridge near Corrour

The Cairngorm Club Footbridge (1912) was built over the Am Beanaidh in Rothiemurchus Forest. Also known as the Iron Bridge, its construction is largely mild steel, with cast iron upstands. Other bridges have been built over the Luibeg Burn at Preas nam Meirleach (1948), over the River Dee near Corrour Bothy and over the River Quoich near Linn of Quoich (2016–17).

=== Footpaths ===
- Repair of eroded parts of the footpath into Coire Etchachan (1995)
- Access and waymarking at the Pass of Ballater (2012)
- Footpath repair on Clachnaben (2019)

=== Woodland ===
- Piper's Wood: 1.72 ha native woodland regeneration in Glen Ey (1987)
- Piper's Wood extension (2013)
- Altanour: also in Glen Ey (2015)

=== Other projects ===
Corrour Bothy reconstruction (1950)

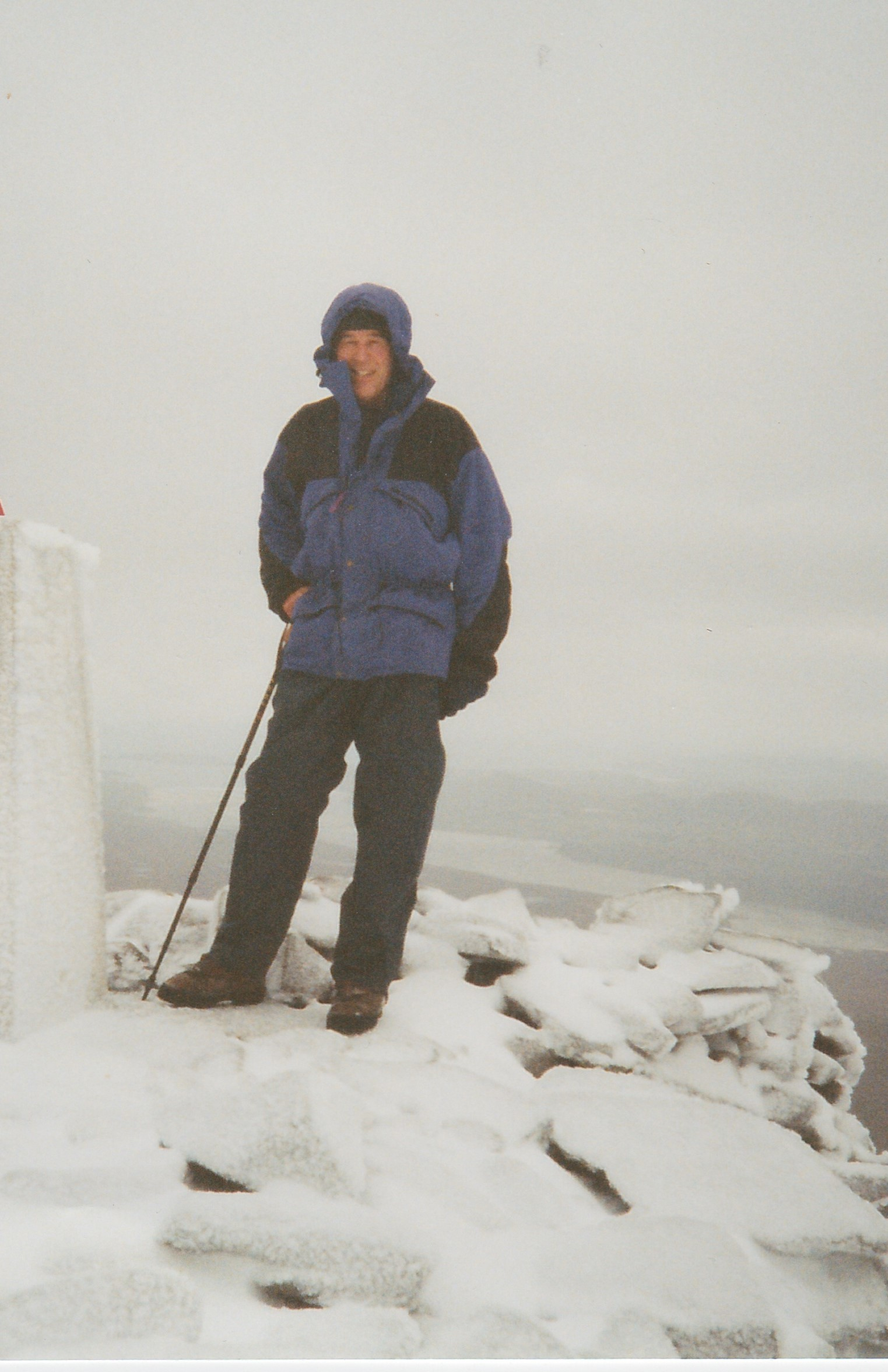
John at Ben Hope

== Deaths ==
Several members have died while pursuing their mountaineering. John Elgie aged 62, died in an avalanche in Lochnagar's Black Spout during a meet on 12 January 2003.
