= Braeriach =

Mountain in Scotland

- Am Bràigh Riabhach
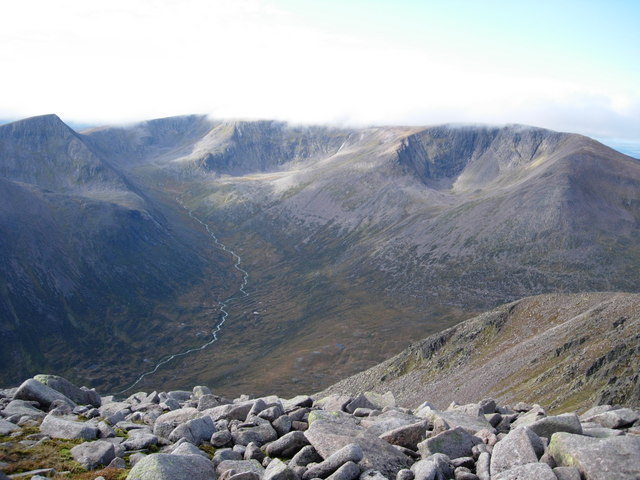
- Braeriach from the southeast

Highest point
- Elevation: 1,296 m (4,252 ft)
- Prominence: 461 m (1,512 ft)
- Parent peak: Ben Macdui
- Listing: Marilyn, Munro
- Coordinates: 57.07817°N 3.72883°W

Naming
- English translation: The brindled upland
- Language of name: Gaelic
- Pronunciation: Scottish Gaelic: [əm ˈpɾaːj ˈrˠiəvəx]

Geography
- Location within Scotland
- Location: Cairngorms, Scotland
- OS grid: NN953999
- Topo map: OS Landranger 36, 43

Listed summits of Braeriach
Name	Grid ref	Height	Status
Braeriach	NN953999	1,296 m (4,252 ft)	Munro, Marilyn
Carn na Criche	NN939982	1,265 m (4,150 ft)	Munro Top
Sròn na Lairige	NH964006	1,184 m (3,885 ft)	Munro Top

Braeriach or Brae Riach (Scottish Gaelic: Am Bràigh Riabhach, 'the brindled upland') is the third-highest mountain in Scotland and all of the British Isles, after Ben Nevis and Ben Macdui, rising 1,296 metres (4,252 ft) above sea level. It is in the Scottish Highlands and is the highest point in the western massif of the Cairngorms, separated from the central section by the Lairig Ghru pass. The summit is a crescent-shaped plateau, overlooking several corries.

Probably the most commonly used route up Braeriach starts from Sugar Bowl car park, on the road leading to the Cairn Gorm ski area. From here a path leads over the hillside to a steep-sided rocky ravine known as the Chalamain Gap, before descending around 100 metres (330 ft) to the Lairig Ghru. After crossing this pass the route heads for the summit via Braeriach's north ridge, crossing a subsidiary peak, Sròn na Lairige. The summit is about 10.5 kilometres (6 1/2 miles) from the car park by this route.

== Snow patch ==
The lingering snows of Braeriach are amongst the most persistent snow patches in Scotland and the whole British Isles. Sphinx is a remote patch of snow in Cairngorms National Park on Braeriach, which is historically known for its semi-permanent year-round longevity; the north-facing corrie of Garbh Coire Mor has entirely melted only in 1933, 1959, 1996, 2003, 2006, 2017, 2018, 2021, 2022, 2023, 2024 and 2025. The rate and occurrence of melting appears to be increasing, with the snow having melted completely in each of the last 5 years. Named for a nearby climbing route, it was first noted by members of the Scottish Mountaineering Club in the 1840s, and is thought by scientists to have fully melted in the 18th century, given the climatic and meteorological records. More generally, Garbh Choire Mor is Scotland's snowiest corrie, where snow typically persists into the summer months. Declining snow cover has persisted in the area since the winter of 1983–1984.

== See also ==
- List of Munro mountains
- Mountains and hills of Scotland
