= Beinn a' Bhùird =

Munro in the Cairngorm mountain range of Scotland

Coordinates: 57.08787°N 3.49907°W

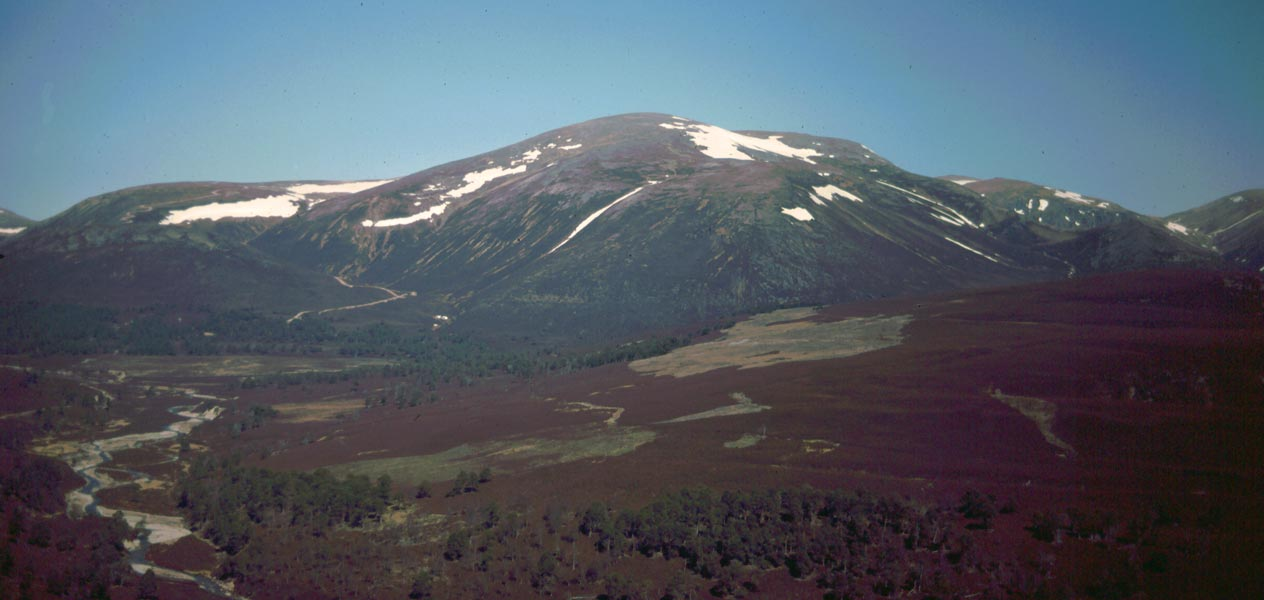

Highest point
- Elevation: 1,197 m (3,927 ft)
- Prominence: c. 456 m
- Parent peak: Cairn Gorm
- Listing: Munro, Marilyn

Naming
- English translation: Mountain of the table
- Language of name: Gaelic
- Pronunciation: Scottish Gaelic: [ˈpeiɲ ə ˈvuːrˠtʲ]

Geography
- Location within Scotland
- Location: Moray / Aberdeenshire
- Parent range: Cairngorms
- OS grid: NJ092006
- Topo map: OS Landranger 36

Beinn a' Bhùird is a Munro in the Cairngorm mountain range of Scotland.

In Watson (1975) the author suggests the mountain should be named Beinn Bòrd – table hill, saying that local Scottish Gaelic speakers pronounced the mountain Paing Bòrd, with some of the older local folk still using Painna Bòrd.

The closest 'village' to Beinn a' Bhùird is Braemar, Aberdeenshire and the most common approach by car is through this village. To reach Beinn a' Bhùird by car, the most common approach is by the Linn of Dee road along the south side of the River Dee to the Linn of Dee, looping back along the north bank to the car park at Allanaquoich where camping is permitted. By this route, the distance between Braemar and Allanaquoich is about 10 miles (16 kilometres).

In 2006, a glider pilot from Deeside Gliding Club crashed on the hillside, spending 24 hours trapped in his plane until he was located by the RAF.

== Ascents ==
The usual ascent of Beinn a' Bhùird is from the car park at Allanaquoich walking up Glen Quoich and following the new path along the line of the old Land Rover road up An Diollaid.

An alternate ascent follows the Quoich Water through the Am Beitheachan to the bealach named The Sneck (Watson, 1975) (and the 1:25000 series Ordnance Survey maps) - between Beinn a' Bhùird and Ben Avon.

== Skiing ==
In the early 1960s, there was an attempt to develop a large ski area on Beinn a' Bhùird. The development was financed by the Panchaud brothers (Gerald and Jhon) of Switzerland who had purchased the estate when skiing in Scotland was booming. The area was to be called Mar Lodge and opened in 1963 after a series of record snowfalls. At the time of opening, there were two T-bars on site, one 620 ft (190 m) long and one 2,050 ft (620 m) long. These offered a total uphill capacity of 1,400 people per hour. Unfortunately, the seasons of 1963–64 and 1964–65 offered very little snow to the area, meaning that the ski lifts were rarely used, with the resort becoming abandoned in 1965. When the resort closed both T-bars were moved to Glenshee to become the Cairnwell T-Bar and Trainer Tow (removed for the 2003 season).

== Gallery ==
Media related to Beinn a' Bhùird at Wikimedia Commons

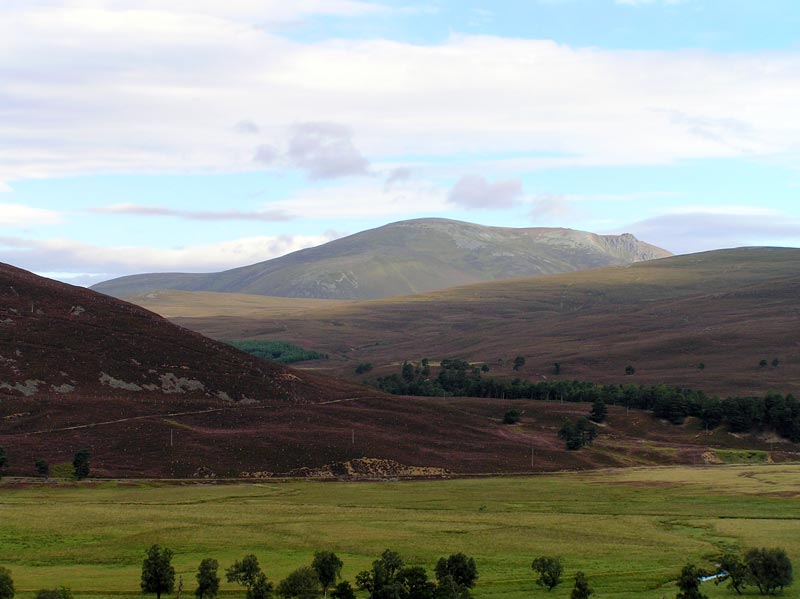
Beinn a' Bhùird from Linn of Dee road

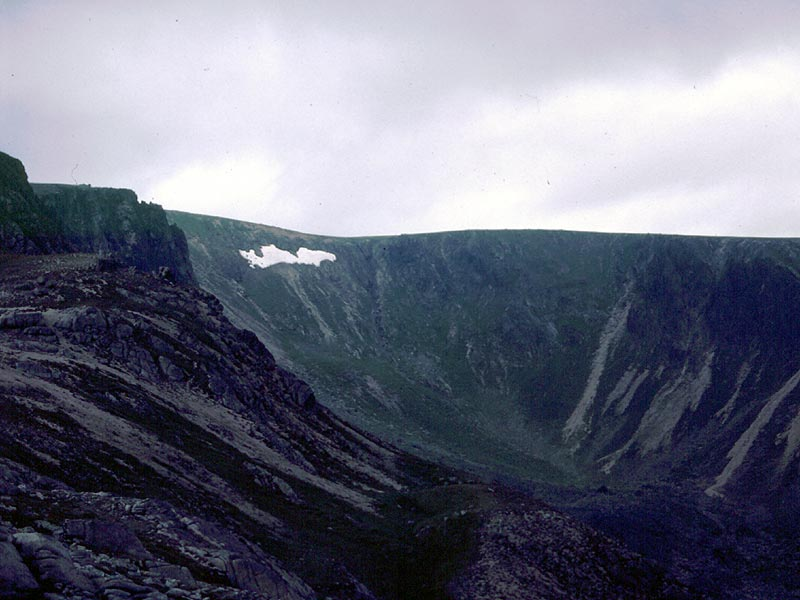
Garbh Choire on Beinn a' Bhùird

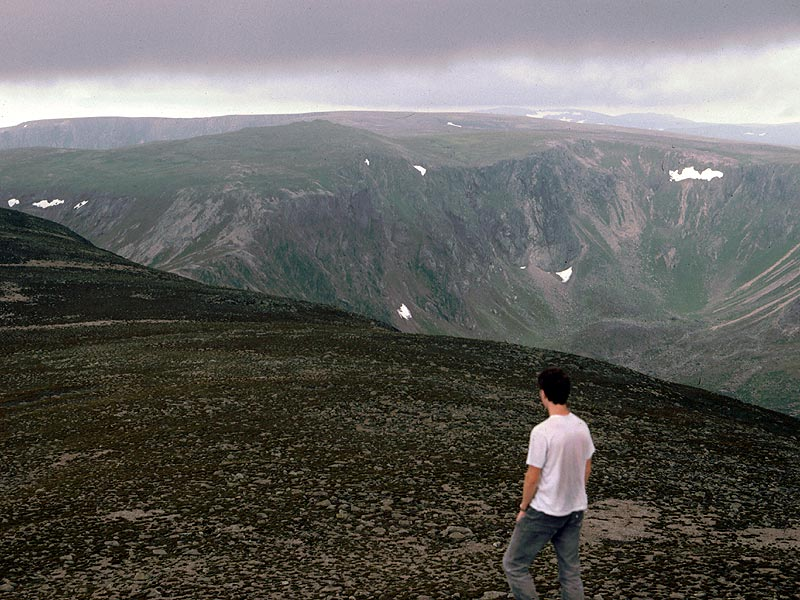
Beinn a' Bhùird from Ben Avon

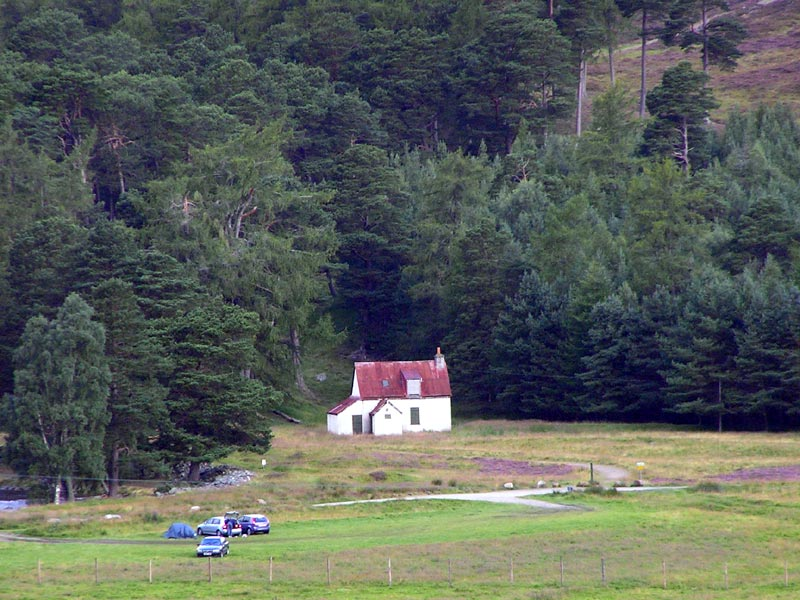
Parking at Allanaquoich

== See also ==
- Ben Nevis
- List of Munro mountains
- Mountains and hills of Scotland

== Sources ==
- Watson, Adam (1975). The Cairngorms. Edinburgh: The Scottish Mountaineering Trust.

–
