= Inverey =

Coordinates: 56°59′04″N 3°30′19″W

Inverey: Scottish Gaelic: Inbhir Eidh
- Location within Aberdeenshire
- OS grid reference: NO088892
- Council area: Aberdeenshire
- Lieutenancy area: Aberdeenshire
- Country: Scotland
- Sovereign state: United Kingdom
- Post town: BALLATER
- Postcode district: AB35
- Police: Scotland
- Fire: Scottish
- Ambulance: Scottish
- UK Parliament: West Aberdeenshire and Kincardine
- Scottish Parliament: Aberdeenshire West

Inverey (/ˌɪnvəˈraɪ/; Scottish Gaelic: Inbhir Eidh) is a hamlet on Mar Lodge Estate, in Aberdeenshire, Scotland.

== Description ==
The hamlet straddles the Ey Burn close to its confluence with the River Dee.

Inverey comprises two 'communities' separated by the Ey Burn – Muckle Inverey (Scottish Gaelic: Inbhir Eidh Mhòr) on the east bank and Little Inverey (Scottish Gaelic: Inbhir Eidh Bheag) on the west.

The ruins of John Farquharson's old castle are still visible a short distance to the north of the road through Inverey, and the old burial-ground a short distance to the north-west of it.

In 1798, Inverey was added to Mar Estate by James Duff, 2nd Earl Fife.

== Notable people ==
=== John Farquharson, 3rd of Inverey ===
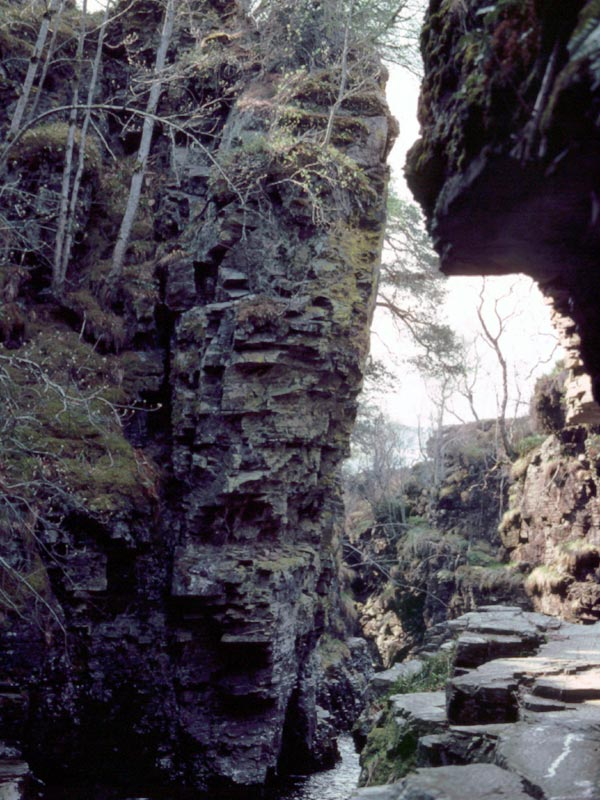
The Colonel's Bed

During the 1689 Jacobite rising of John Graham of Claverhouse following the arrival, in November 1688, of William III and Mary II in Britain – John Farquharson was commissioned as colonel by John Graham. Due to his swarthy complexion, John Farquharson is usually referred to as the Black Colonel. The Black Colonel participated in this rising, and after preventing a Government force of 100 men from occupying Braemar Castle he burnt it preventing its use by Government troops.

The final clash of the rising came on 17 July 1689 at the battle of Killiecrankie – where John Graham was killed. After this battle John Farquharson returned to the Braemar area – frequently staying at his home in Inverey Castle. During at least one visit by the ‘red-coats’ led him to hide-out in Glen Ey (pronounced iy, not eye) on the shelf of rock still known as The Colonel's Bed. The ‘red-coats’ made do with plundering and burning the castle – the Black Colonel's loyal retainers ensuring he died of old-age about 1698, and was buried in Inverey.

=== John Lamont ===
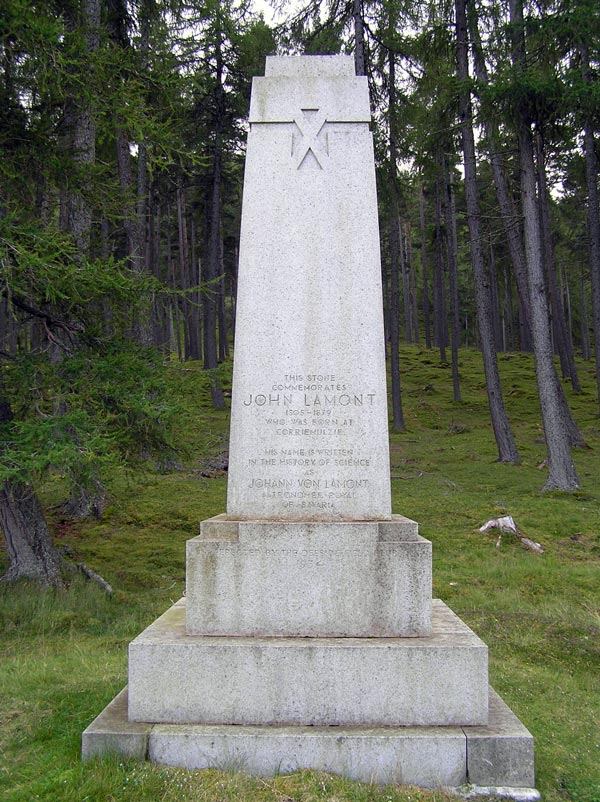
Memorial to John Lamont

John Lamont was a highly regarded astronomer was born at Corriemulzie near Inverey the son of Robert Lamont (forester to James, 2nd Earl Fife) and his wife Elizabeth Ewan.

In 1934 the Deeside Field Club erected a memorial to John Lamont in Inverey. The gray granite memorial stands on the south side of the road about the middle of Muckle Inverey.

== Gallery ==
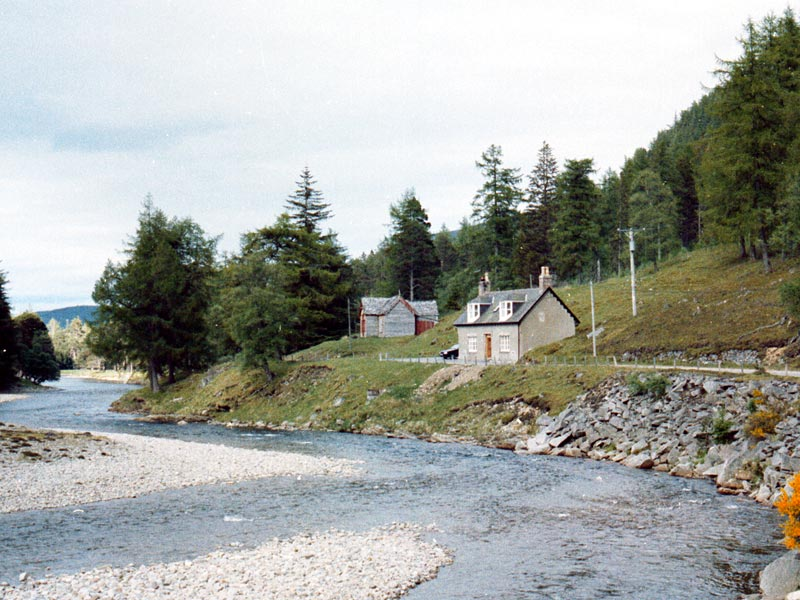
Meall Darroch

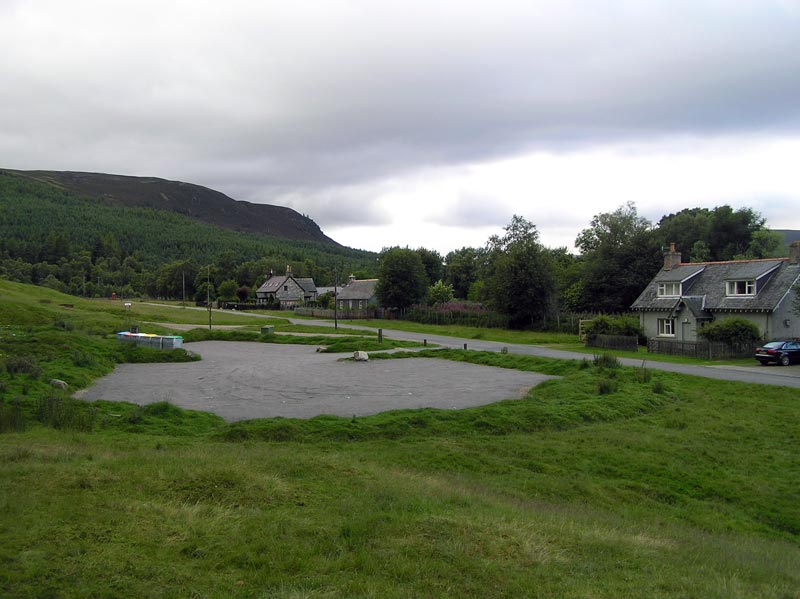
Inverey

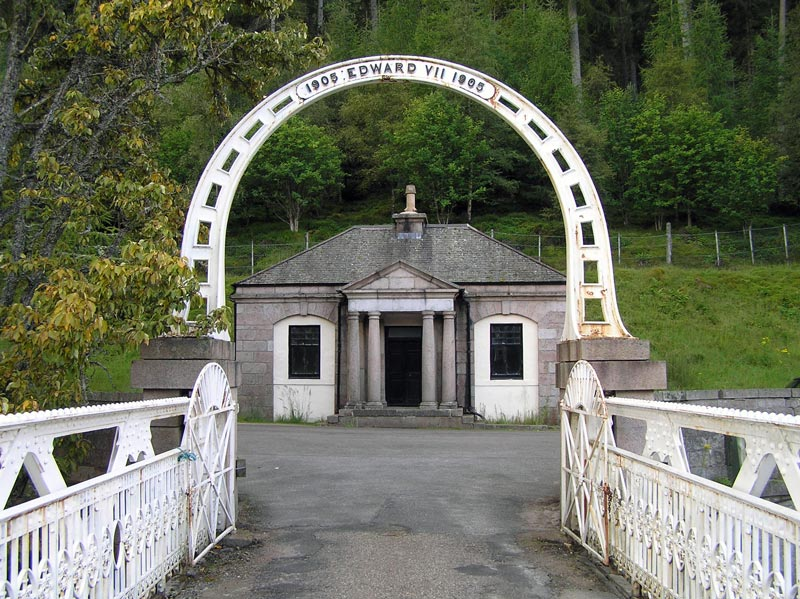
Victoria Bridge, Inverey

== Sources ==
- Watson, Adam (1975). The Cairngorms. Edinburgh: The Scottish Mountaineering Trust.
- Wyness, Fenton (1968). Royal Valley : The Story Of The Aberdeenshire Dee. Alex P. Reid & Son, Aberdeen.

== See also ==
- Places, place names, and structures on Mar Lodge Estate
