= Places, place names, and structures on Mar Lodge Estate =

Coordinates: 56.976836°N 3.61565°W

Mar Lodge Estate is the largest remnant of the ancient Earldom of Mar in Aberdeenshire, Scotland and is now owned by the National Trust for Scotland.

== Allanaquoich ==
A locality on the east bank of the Quoich Water close to its confluence with the River Dee.

== Altanour Lodge ==
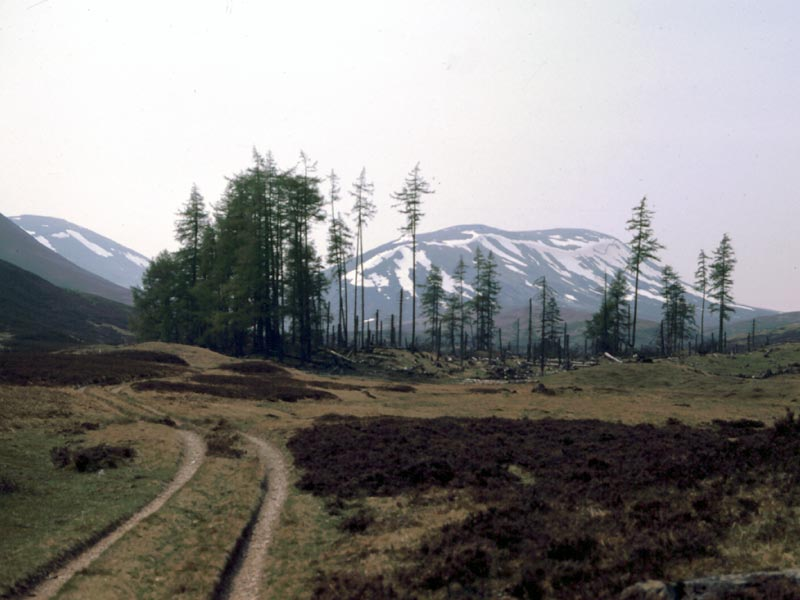

A ruined hunting lodge (pronounced like Altan Ower), at the head of Glen Ey (southern-end), in a small plantation of spruce and larch.

Named from the nearby stream Alltan Odhar - dun streamlet (Watson 1975).

A four-wheel drive road runs between Altanour Lodge and the public road at Inverey.

== Am Beitheachan ==
A locality (pronounced like be-a-chan) in Glen Quoich upstream of where the Dubh Ghleann joins it near the foot of Beinn a' Bhùird - the little birch place - (Watson 1975).

Although local people always call this E [Glen Quoich as it turns eastward] part the Beitheachan and not the Quoich, all the maps have omitted it.

— Watson (1975)

In Watson (1975) the author is evidently relying on his deep understanding of the local Gaelic for spelling and pronunciation, because in Dixon and Green (1995) (relying of documents) refer to the locality as Beachan - discussing a proposal to put the rental of specific shielings up for public roup (auction):

... and disputes between the tenants of Dalmore and Allanaquoich, led to a proposal in 1727 to put the shielings of Beachan (upper Glen Quoich), Glen Quoich, Glen Lui (recently cleared) [of farmers], Glen Derry, Glen Luibeg and the north side of Glen Dee to public roup (GD 124/1300/4)

— Dixon and Green (1995)

== Black Bridge ==
The bridge in Glen Lui over the Lui Water roughly halfway between Linn of Lui and Derry Wood - see main reference in Glen Lui article.

== Bynack Lodge ==
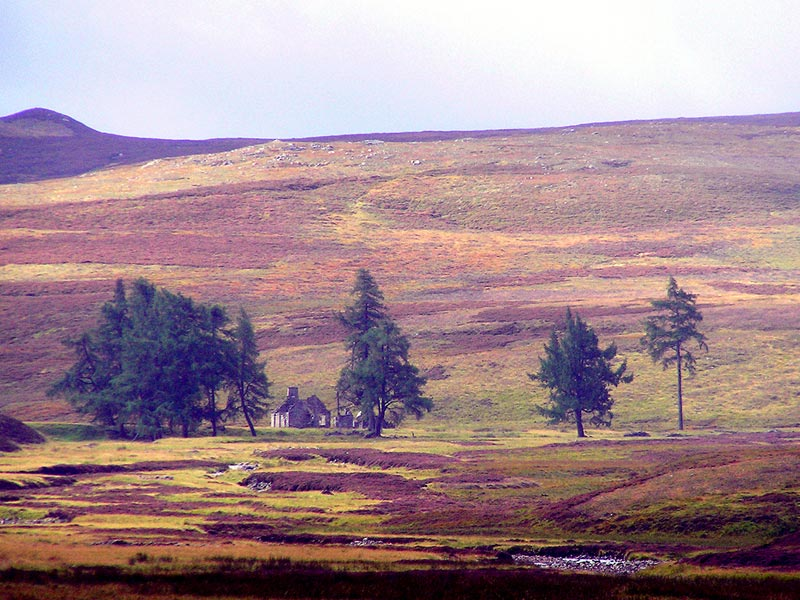

Along with Derry Lodge, and Geldie Lodge - one of the 'three main' hunting lodges on the estate built in the late nineteenth-century during the rise of hunting on the estate - Dixon and Green (1995).

== Chest of Dee ==
A series of waterfalls and deep pools on the River Dee slightly up-river from White Bridge.

From Ciste Dhe - Watson (1975).

== Clach nan Taillear ==
Clach nan Taillear stone of the tailors - Watson (1975) is a large stone by the Lairig Ghru where:

Three tailors once perished while sheltering in the snow one New Year's Eve. They had wagered that they would dance a reel on the same night in Rothiemurchus and Braemar. Having danced in Speyside, they set out through the Lairig, only to succumb - as usual in these exposure cases - when the worst of the crossing was behind them.

— Watson (1975)

== Corriemulzie ==
A locality on the Linn of Dee road.

== Corrour Bothy ==
A simple stone building in the Lairig Ghru, at the point below Cairn Toul, used as a Mountain Refuge.

== Derry Dam ==
Derry Dam is a structure - partially surviving in Glen Derry about 1 1/2 miles (2.4 km) upstream from Derry Lodge and shown on Ordnance Survey maps - according to Watson (1975) it was used to dam the water of the Derry Burn for use floating trees down the glen. He continues:

It was built in the early 19th century by Alexander Davidson, a noted Deeside character who turned to poaching after the timber floating, and whose racy life story you can read in Michie's Deeside Tales

— Watson (1975)

Michie (pronounced like Mickey) is John Grant Michie (1830–1904) a Minister of Dinnet author of Deeside Tales (1872), Loch Kinnord (1877), Logie-Coldstone (1896), and Records of Invercauld (1901) - Wyness (1968).

== Derry Lodge ==
Along with Bynack Lodge, and Geldie Lodge - one of the 'three main' hunting lodges on the estate built in the late nineteenth-century during the rise of hunting on the estate - Dixon and Green (1995).

Located within Derry Wood on the slopes of Derry Cairngorm, it was likely used as temporary accommodation for shooting parties to reduce the need to return to Mar Lodge at night.

== Derry Wood ==
A wooded locality on the slopes of Derry Cairngorm, where Glen Derry, and Glen Luibeg join at the head of Glen Lui - see main reference in Glen Lui article.

== Dubh Ghleann ==
A glen that joins Glen Quoich near the foot of Beinn a Bhuird (pronounced like do glen) - from dark valley - Watson (1975).

== Gallows Tree ==
A tree on the south-bank of the River Dee a short distance west of Victoria Bridge that was used as a gallows.

The date of its last use is not known, but in Wyness (1968) the author recounts the story of a curse against the Farquharsons being fulfilled in 1806 when the "direct male line of Farquharson came to an end". The curse - as he relates - was against a "Farquharson laird" who had sentenced a Lamont of Inverey to death for "cattle-rustling and sheep-steeling".

The tree is dead, supported by wires, and has been since at least 1925.

The Gallows Tree might have remained alive for years, but its roots were undermined by digging of gravel at the roadside, and it fell into the pit. It is now dead, but held in position by wire.

— Gordon (1925)

== Geldie Lodge ==
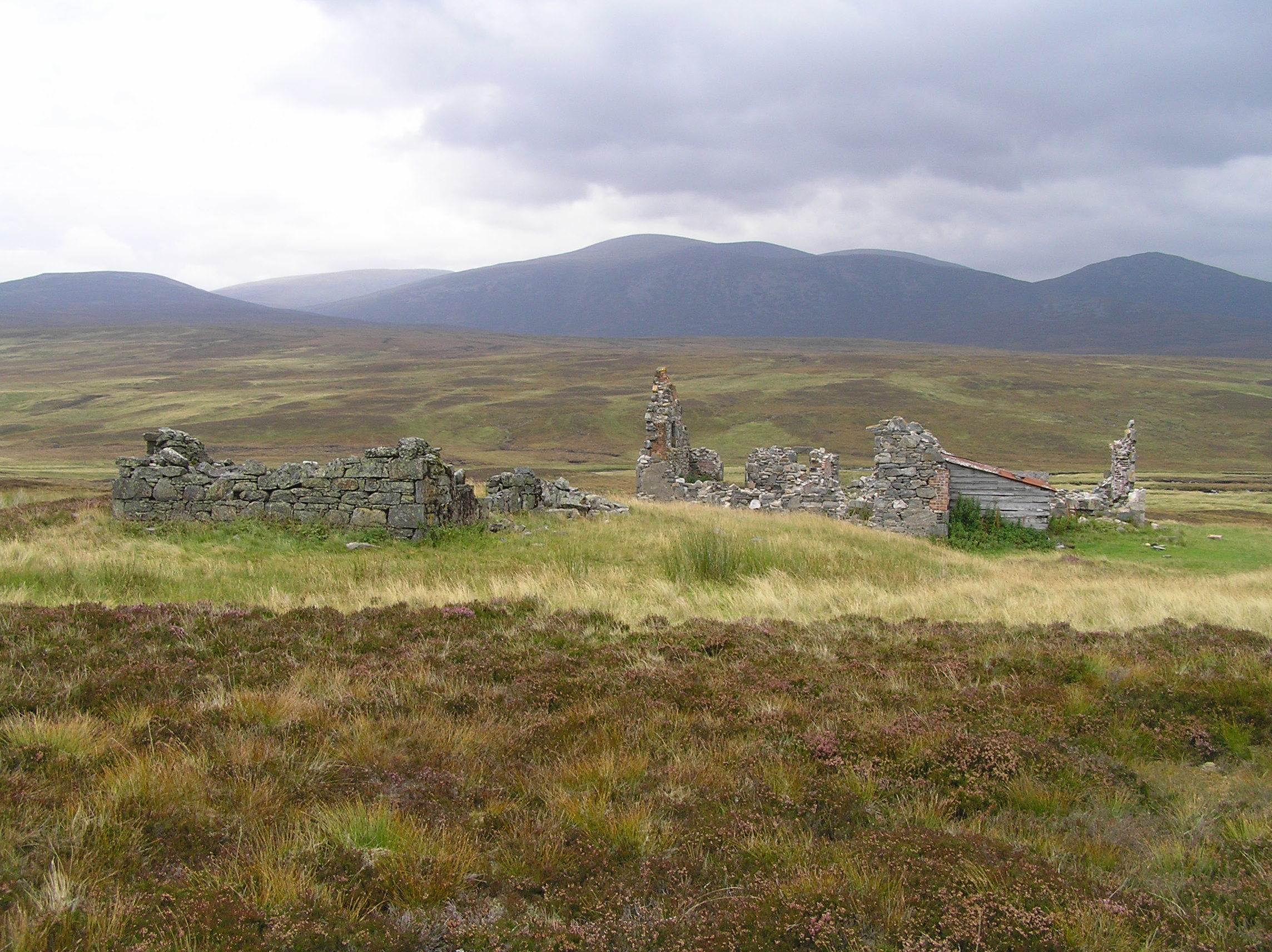

Along with Bynack Lodge, and Derry Lodge - one of the 'three main' hunting lodges on the estate built in the late nineteenth-century during the rise of hunting on the estate - Dixon and Green (1995).

While describing the course of the River Dee in Anderson (1911) - the author mentions that Geldie Lodge had been tenanted for many years by Lord Farquhar a friend of the estate's owner, the Duke of Fife.

== Glen Lui ==
One of the main glens of the estate.

== Glen Quoich ==
One of the main glens of the estate.

== Inverey ==
The only remaining hamlet on Mar Lodge Estate.

== Lairig Ghru ==
A route and mountain pass that partially lies on Mar Lodge Estate. To its west is The Devil's Point.

== Luibeg ==
A cottage and locality around the Luibeg Burn where it joins with the Derry Burn to create the Lui Water - see main reference in Glen Lui article.

Luibeg Cottage has been home to many of the estate's deer-stalkers or keepers.

== March Burn ==
Is a burn in the Lairig Ghru slightly to the east of the pass summit - the Mar Lodge Estate side.

In the first paragraph of Gordon (1925) the author uses the term 'march' in the old-sense of a boundary:

The Cairngorms rise from the highlands of central Scotland; they stand on the county march between Inverness and Aberdeen, and some of them, as Beinn a' Bhuird and Ben Mac Dhui, are partly in the shire of Banff.

— Gordon (1925) (p1)

He again uses the term in the old-sense when describing a September crossing of the Lairig Ghru where he gives the burn its old as well as its contemporary Anglicised name:

Allt na Criche, or the March Burn, falls in white spray to the Lairig from the northern spur of Ben Mac Dhui. The snow is drifted deeply over this boundary burn, and on this September day a cornice of snow of the past winter still projected half across it.

— Gordon (1925) (p81)

== Mar Lodge ==
The 'main house' on Mar Lodge Estate, built in 1895 for Alexander Duff, 1st Duke of Fife.

== Mar Lodge Brae ==
Is the name of the incline between Corriemulzie and the Victoria Bridge.

== Pools of Dee ==
Three small pools near the summit of the Lairig Ghru on the Corrour side.

The old name was Lochan Dubh na Lairige - black tarn of the Lairig - Watson (1975) who adds:

which anglicisation has turned into the erroneous and less poetic Pools of Dee.

— Watson (1975)

Erroneous because the pools are not the source of the River Dee - see Wells of Dee

== Preas nam Meirleach ==
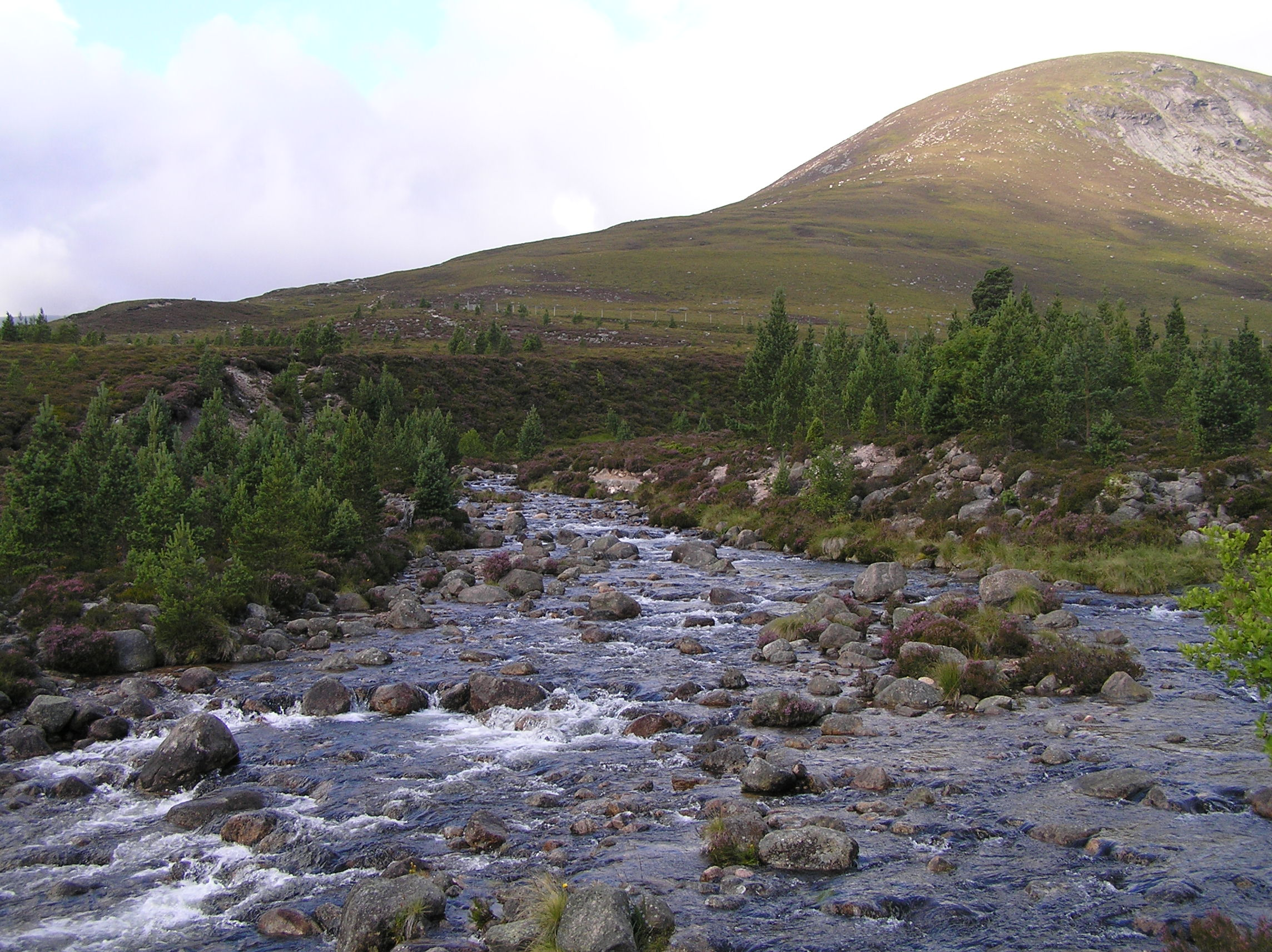

Literally copse of the robbers - Watson (1975), but colloquially known as Robbers Copse - the wooded locality were the route between Glen Luibeg and the Lairig Ghru crosses the Luibeg Burn.

On the Luibeg side of Preas nam Meirleach - Watson (1975) names the Sands of Lui describing it as a stretch of gravel washed down by the floods in 1829 and 1956.

The flood of 1829 is 'remembered' in Deeside as the Muckle Spate. On the evening of the 2nd of August 1829 it began raining, and continued into the next day when a thunder storm broke in the afternoon over the Cairngorms. The Dee being the main river of the district rose rapidly above its normal level - 15 ft (4.6 m) in places (27 ft at Banchory) carrying away the bridges over the Linn of Dee, and Linn of Quoich - Wyness (1968).

== Ruighe Ealasaid ==
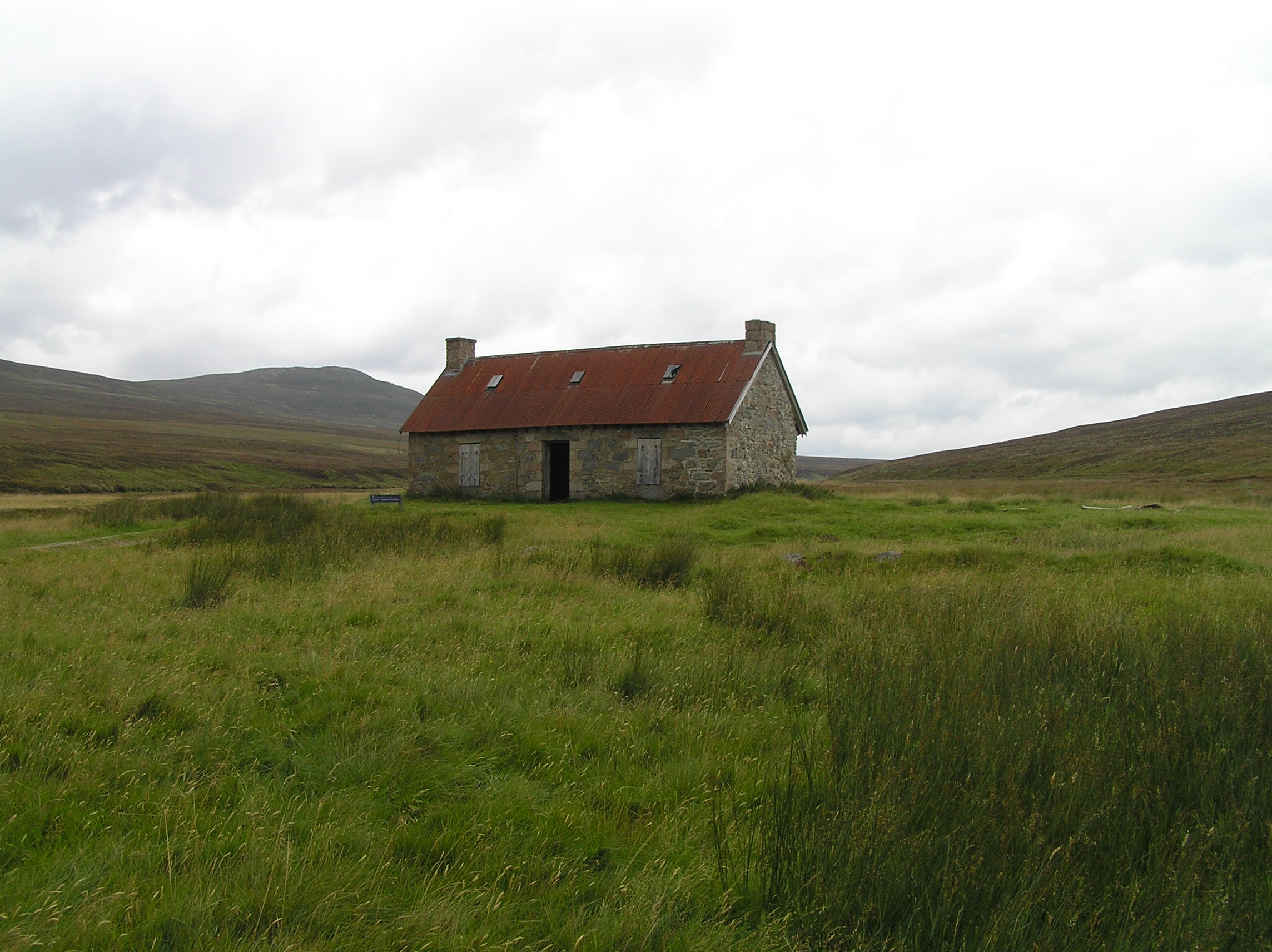

Ruighe Ealasaid – meaning 'Elizabeth's shiel' – Watson and Allen 1984 is a partially ruined house in Glen Geldie close to the confluence of the Bynack Burn with the Geldie Burn.

Like other place names on the estate incorporating 'shiel' - the name probably pre-dates the existing building bearing the name.

== Ruigh nan clach ==
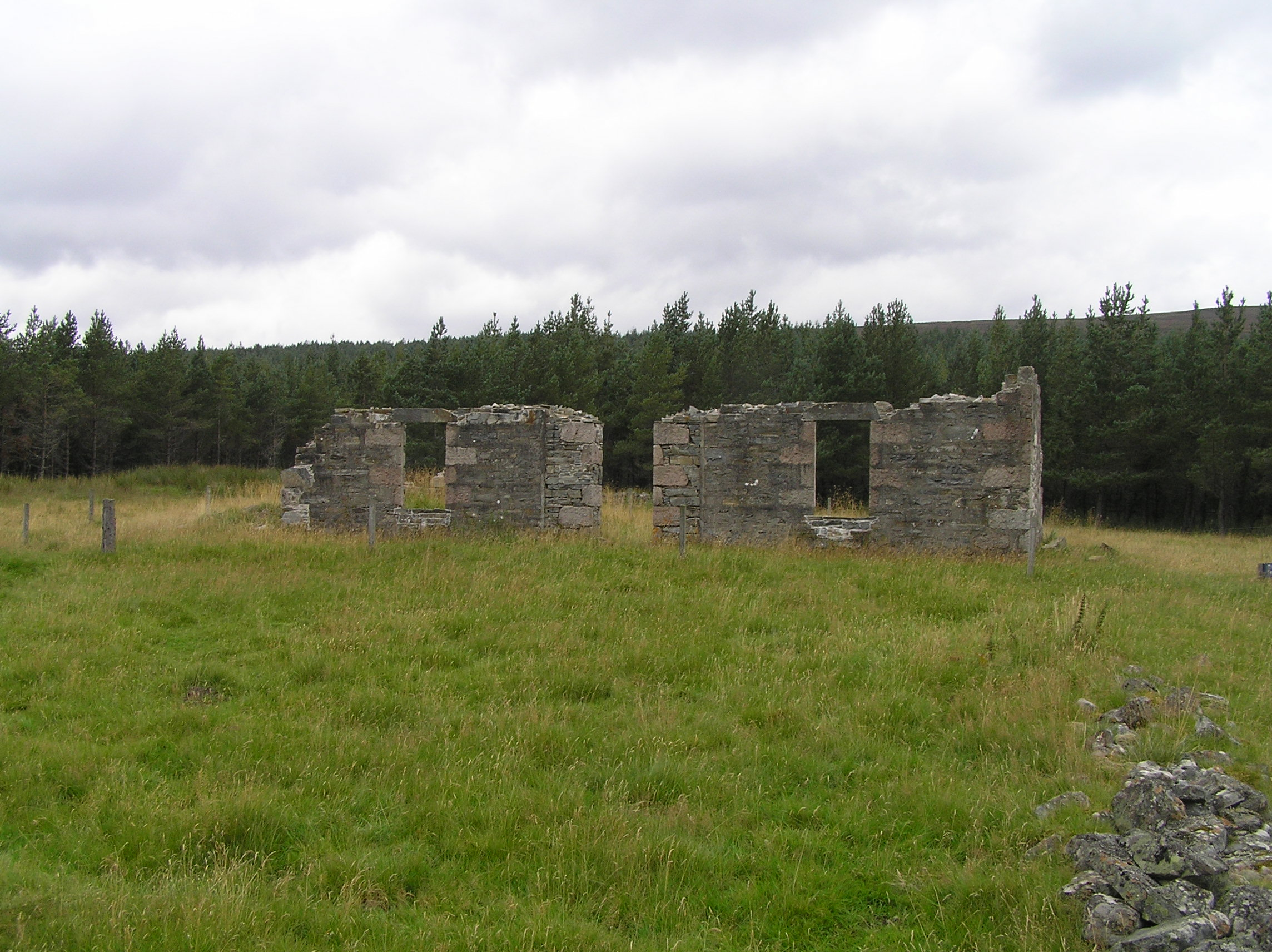

Ruigh nan clach – meaning 'sheil of the stones' – Watson and Allen 1984 is a ruined keeper's house near the bank of the Geldie Burn a short distance upstream from White Bridge.

The name is derived from 'Ruighe nan clach' – and commemorates an earlier sheiling nearby.

== St Ninian's Chapel ==
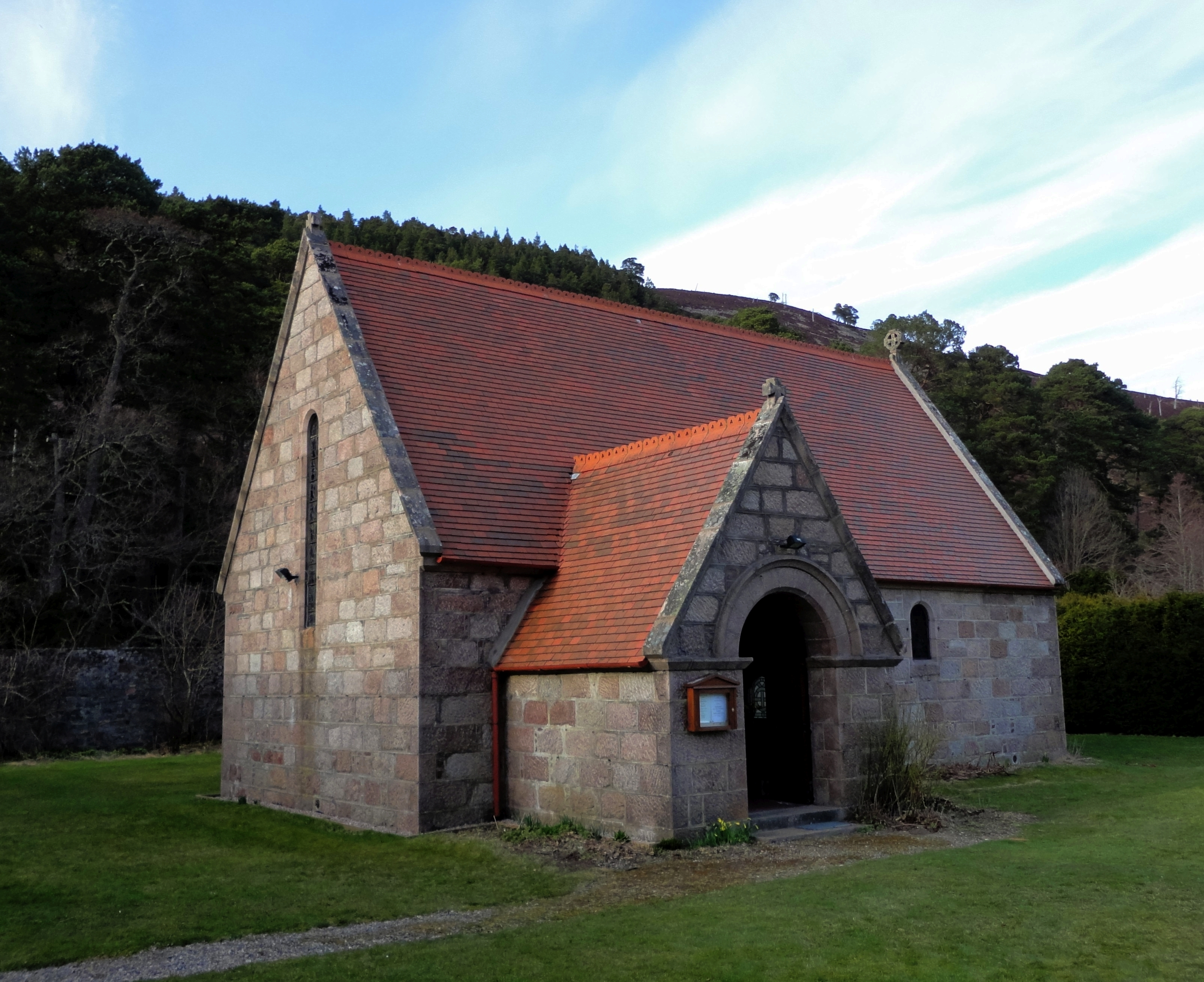
St Ninian's Chapel

St Ninian's Chapel stands immediately adjacent to Mar Lodge and was originally the private chapel of the owners of Mar Lodge. Alexander Duff, 1st Duke of Fife, and his family are buried in the chapel.

== Sapper's Bothy ==
A ruined stone 'bothy' just east of the summit of Ben Macdui built around 1847 by (or for the use of) the survey team from the Ordnance Survey who surveyed the Cairn Gorm / Ben Macdui plateau. This survey settled the argument over whether Ben Macdui or Ben Nevis was the highest mountain in Britain.

In Watson (1975) the author gives its map reference as 991988.

== Sneck ==
The Sneck is the name of the bealach between Beinn a' Bhùird and Ben Avon - Watson (1975), and the 1:25000 series Ordnance Survey maps.

== Victoria Bridge ==
The white iron bridge over the Dee at Mar Lodge.

== Wells of Dee ==
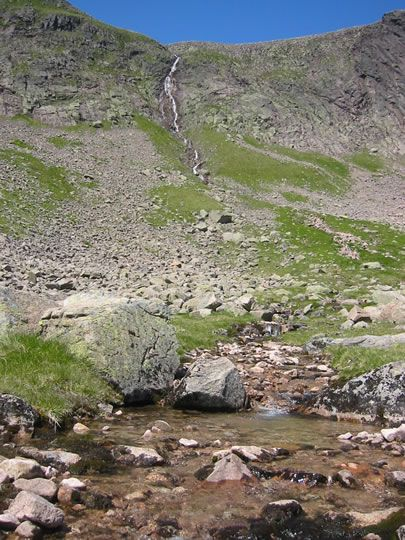

The source of the River Dee, the water rising from a spring on the Braeriach / Einich plateau at about 1,220 m (4,000 ft) - Watson (1975) - who continues:

After about 2/3 km on the plateau, the infant Dee crashes over the rocky face of Garbh Choire Dhaidh and cascades 150 m to the bed of the corrie below. A large snow bridge often lasts far into summer at the top of the fall; below the stream thunders on down to Glen Dee.

— Watson (1975)

The Ordnance Survey maps name the waterfall the Falls of Dee, the corrie as An Garbh Choire, and the burn as Allt a Gharbh choire. Covering the same ground earlier in the twentieth century - Anderson (1911) records:

Here the stream acquires the name of the Garchary - an Anglicised version of a Gaelic title signifying "The burn of the rough corrie"; and well is the corrie so named. The Garchary Fall proper is about 600 feet (180 m) in length, but the stream descends 1,400 feet (430 m) farther till it reaches the defile separating Braeriach and Ben Muich Dhui [sic].

— Anderson (1911)

That 'defile' being the Lairig Ghru.

== White Bridge ==
The bridge over the River Dee near its confluence with the Geldie Burn - carrying the estate road to the south-bank of the River Dee giving access to:

- Glen Geldie and Geldie Lodge (ruin)
- Glen Bynack and Bynack Lodge (ruin)
- Glen Tilt

== Sources ==
- Anderson, Robert (1911), Deeside, Adam & Charles Black, 4 Soho Square, London
- Dixon, P.J.; Green, S.T. (1995), Mar Lodge Estate Grampian : An Archaeological Survey, Royal Commission on the Ancient and Historical Monuments of Scotland, Edinburgh
- Gordon, Seton (1925). The Cairngorm Hills Of Scotland. London, England.: Cassell and Company.
- Watson, Adam (1975). The Cairngorms. Edinburgh: The Scottish Mountaineering Trust.
- Watson, Adam; Allan, Elizabeth J. P. (1984), Place names of Upper Deeside, Aberdeen University Press
- Wyness, Fenton (1968), Royal Valley : The Story Of The Aberdeenshire Dee, Alex P. Reid & Son, Aberdeen
