= Mar Lodge Estate =

Estate in Aberdeenshire, Scotland

Mar Lodge Estate National Nature Reserve
- IUCN category II (national park)
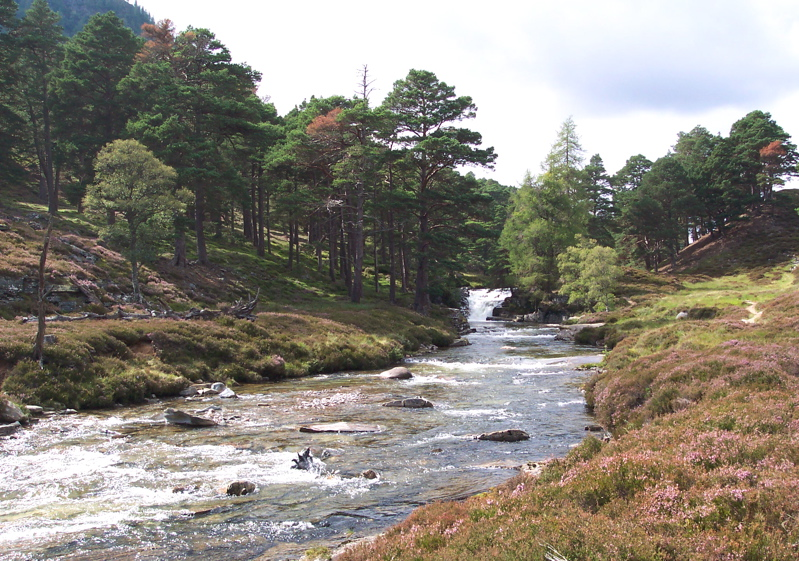
- The River Quoich

- Location within Scotland
- Location: Aberdeenshire, Scotland
- Coordinates: 56.991857°N 3.489304°W
- Area: 293 km^{2} (113 sq mi)
- Designation: NatureScot
- Established: 2017
- Owner: National Trust for Scotland
- Website: https://www.nts.org.uk/visit/places/mar-lodge-estate

Mar Lodge Estate is a highland estate in western Aberdeenshire, Scotland, which has been owned and managed by the National Trust for Scotland (NTS) since 1995. Its principal building, Mar Lodge, is about 4 miles (6.4 km) west of the village of Braemar. The estate is recognised as one of the most important nature conservation landscapes in the British Isles and occupies nearly 8% of the Cairngorms National Park, covering 29,340 hectares (72,500 acres). The natural heritage value of the estate is reflected by the fact that much of it is designated as a Site of Special Scientific Interest (SSSI), a Special Area of Conservation (SAC) and a Special Protection Area (SPA). The entire estate has been classified as a national nature reserve since May 2017, and is designated a Category II protected area by the International Union for Conservation of Nature.

Extreme weather conditions are experienced across the estate, especially on the plateau. Landslides, avalanches and floods alter the landscape and give it an interesting geomorphology. The estate is characterised by rounded granite Cairngorm mountains to the north, with deep corries and crags down to the valley floor. Spectacular glacial breaches include the Lairig Ghru and Lairig an Laoigh. To the south west are the more open, rolling hills of the Geldie. Waters flowing from the mountains become the headwaters of the River Dee.

The estate is popular with hill walkers, containing 14 Munros, and 4 of the 5 highest mountains in Scotland, including Britain’s second highest mountain, Ben Macdui. A car park and toilet facilities are provided by NTS close to the waterfall of the Linn of Dee, which is the main access point to the area. Public access to the estate for outdoor activities such as hillwalking, climbing and wild camping is permitted by the general right to responsible access that applies to all land in Scotland under the Scottish outdoor access code.

== Flora and fauna ==
The estate contains examples of remnants of the ancient Caledonian pine forest, heather moorland, juniper scrub and a part of the high Cairngorm plateau. It supports important populations of red grouse, waders and raptors.

The Caledonian pine forest is home to red squirrels, pine martens, wood ants and birds such as the black grouse, Scottish crossbill and parrot crossbill, which are all rare or absent across most of Britain. The higher areas on the Cairngorm plateau host breeding populations of dotterel, snow buntings and ptarmigan, and is also the largest area of arctic-alpine flora in Britain.

== Built environment ==
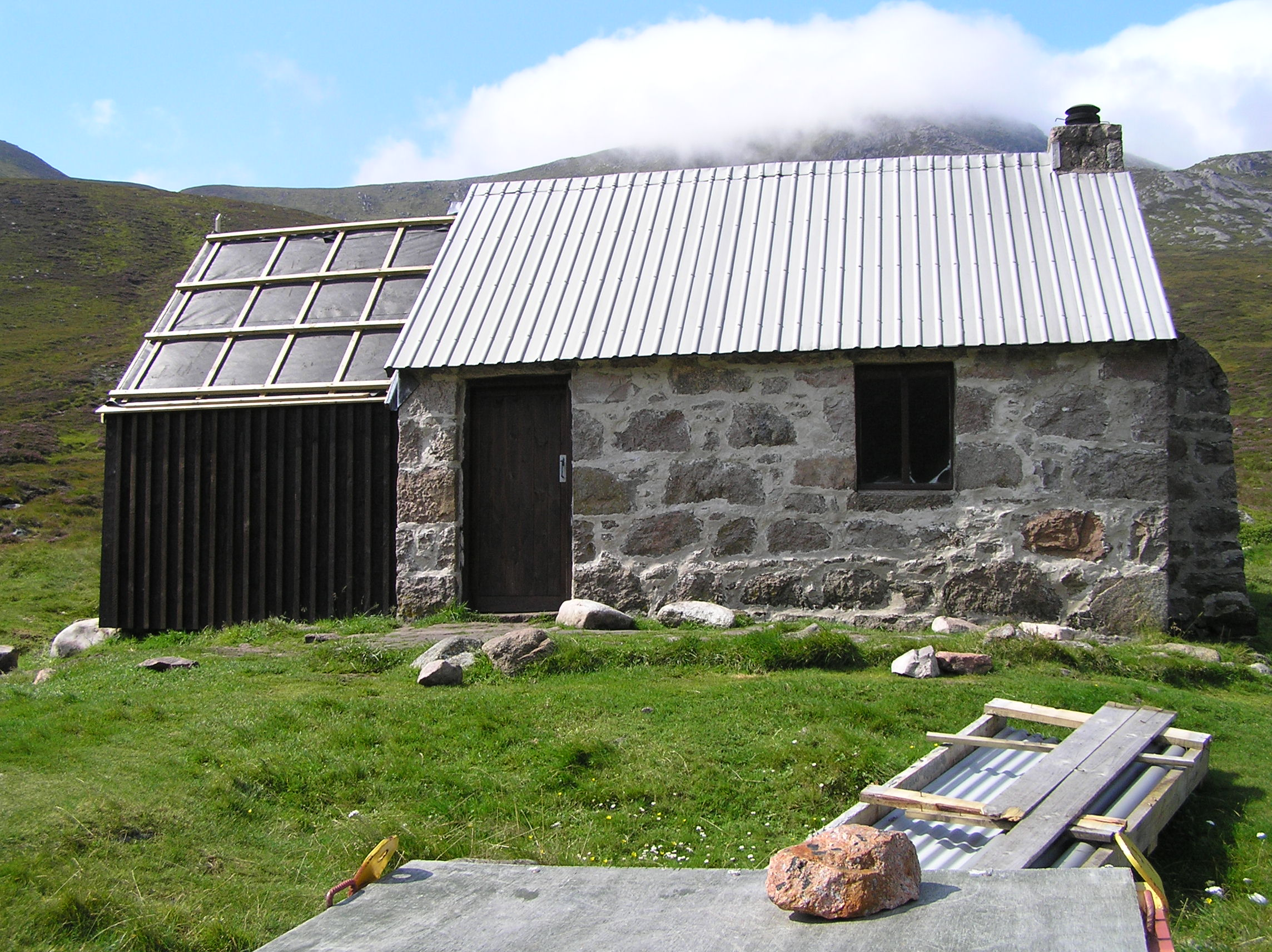
Corrour Bothy on Mar Lodge Estate, showing the toilet block extension

The architectural importance of the estate is reflected in the fact that there are 5 listed buildings including Mar Lodge, which was built in 1895 by the Duke of Fife. The ballroom has 2,435 red deer stags heads lining the walls and ceiling. The lodge was severely damaged by a fire in 1991 but rebuilt soon thereafter. It has since been converted into holiday flats and retains many of the grand features of its heyday as a hunting lodge.

Six hunting lodges were constructed on the estate to allow shooting parties to be accommodated away from the main Mar Lodge building. Only one, Derry Lodge, remains intact, although it is now in a dilapidated condition. In 2016 NTS submitted plans to renovate the lodge to provide hostel accommodation: as the lodge is located 6 km from the nearest road at Linn of Dee this hostel would be accessible only by foot or bicycle.

The estate includes land which has a number of national and international natural heritage designations, and is one of the country's largest areas of Scheduled Ancient Monuments and archaeological sites.

In 2006 the Cairngorms National Park Authority approved a planning application from the Mountain Bothies Association (MBA) to extend Corrour Bothy to install a wood-burning stove and add a toilet block to improve facilities for visitors. In January 2023 Ruighe Ealasaid opened as an additional bothy on the estate, following two years of work by the MBA to bring a formerly derelict building back into use.

== History ==
Mar Lodge Estate is the largest remnant of the historic Earldom of Mar. Following the participation of John "Bobbing John" Erskine, 6th Earl of Mar in the Jacobite Rising of 1715 the estate was forfeited in 1716, which brought an end to the essentially feudal landholding system practiced in the Earldom of Mar, although the process of resolving the forfeiture of 1716 took many years. The next owners of the estate were James Erskine, Lord Grange, brother of the Earl of Mar, and David Erskine, Lord Dun.

Dalmore, the westernmost part was bought by the astute entrepreneur William Duff of Dipple, between 1730 and 1737. This formed the nucleus of Mar Estate. In the years that followed, the many minor lairdships surrounding the two large estates of Invercauld and Mar were gradually absorbed by one or the other, until they were the only two estates in Braemar.

In the 19th century the estate moved towards being used primarily for recreational shooting and fishing with the building of the Hunting Lodges of Derry Lodge, Geldie Lodge and Bynack Lodge. The hamlet of Inverey is the only survivor of the estate clearance – not counting the village of Braemar part of which was also very much part of Mar Estate well into the 20th century. In 1879 Alexander William George Duff succeeded his father James becoming the 6th Earl Fife. At this time the Earl owned huge swaths of land in addition to the estate as the head of many Scottish Feudal Baronies, including MacDuff, named for James Duff, 2nd Earl Fife. In 1889 he married the Princess Royal and was made 1st Duke of Fife. Following his death in 1912 the estate was managed by trustees, later passing to Princess Alexandra, Duchess of Fife.

Between 1942 and 1944, Company 25, of the 2nd Forestry District, of the Canadian Forestry Corps operated the Canadian camp, a lumber camp on the land east of Lui Bridge on both sides of the road, and set about cutting down trees and processing them into lumber to support the war effort.

In 1959 Alexander Ramsay, Lord and Baron of Braemar inherited the estate from his aunt. In 1962 the Mar Lodge Estate was briefly owned by the Ashdale Property Company, who then sold it to the Swiss Panchaud family, in 1962. The brothers Gerald and John Panchaud ran the estate as a commercial sporting venture and the Lodge as a hotel. Vehicle tracks were constructed throughout the estate, including one leading close to the summit of Beinn a' Bhùird which was constructed for a proposed skiing development. The Panchauds also started the construction of a ski centre on the hill behind Mar Lodge.

In 1989 the estate was bought by Mar Lodge Estate Inc., a company owned by the German-American entrepreneur John Kluge, which ran the estate for sporting purposes, with a greater emphasis on sensitive land management and improvement of facilities and buildings. Renovation of the Lodge was interrupted by a fire in 1991 and finally completely in 1993.

On 30 June 1995 Mar Lodge Estate was acquired by the National Trust for Scotland. The Trust did not have the necessary money and required substantial financial assistance from both private & public organisations to fund the purchase. The Easter Charitable Trust made a conditional offer of £4.5 million, and the Heritage Lottery Fund offered more-than £10 million. £1.5 million of the funds raised went towards the purchase, and more-than £8 million went as an endowment, with Scottish Natural Heritage (SNH) entering into a 25-year Management Agreement, a 5-year Management Plan, and a 1-year Costed Capital Project Programme (renewed annually) with the Trust as frameworks to guide the provision of further public money. The purchase was completed in the knowledge that SNH would be an "active partner in managing the Estate".

At the time there was much speculation that the Prince Charles, Duke of Rothesay was behind the donation, however it was later discovered that Ann Marie Salvesen, a publicity-shy member of the Christian Salvesen shipping and distribution dynasty had anonymously donated £4.5m to assist with the purchase.

== Conservation management ==
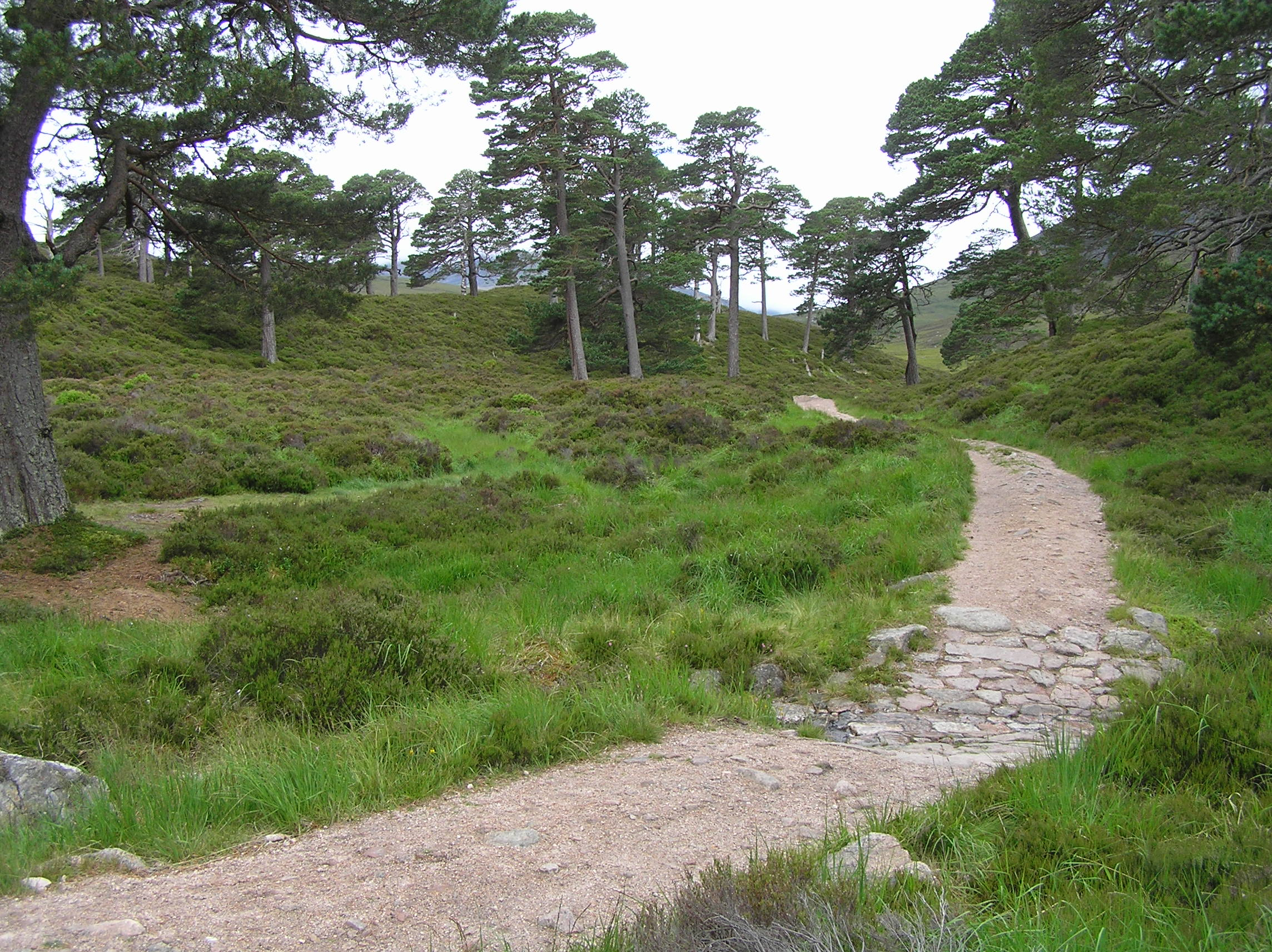
Track leading west from Luibeg to the edge of the Caledonian pinewood on Mar Lodge Estate

Following the purchase of the estate by the National Trust for Scotland, the report Mar Lodge Estate: Landscape Assessment Study, commissioned jointly by the Trust and Scottish Natural Heritage, was published in 1996. The study was a detailed assessment of the landscape character of Mar Lodge Estate that considered the "pressures and opportunities for change in the landscape" whilst assessing "the sensitivity of the landscape to change" and included the recommendation of several conservation objectives (including the reiteration of existing Trust objectives) and principles to guide how the landscape of Mar Lodge Estate "may be conserved, enhanced or restructured". The primary aim of the study was to provide enough detailed information about the landscape of the estate to inform and shape an estate management plan. The resulting plan included the following principles:

- Alignment with the 'Unna Principles'.
- Advocacy of the 'long walk in'.
- Recognition that the Caledonian pinewoods were a "prime habitat for conservation".
- Intention to let the Caledonian pinewoods "expand its range by natural regeneration to create a self-sustaining woodland" without "fencing, tree planting or use of fertilisers".
- Intention that "woodland expansion will be achieved by a substantial reduction in deer numbers".

A major objective of the National Trust for Scotland is to conserve the "wild land" quality on the Estate. The 1996 Landscape Assessment Study contained a number of proposals aiming to achieve these objectives.

- Dissuading and restricting use of existing vehicle tracks and the non-maintenance and restoration of hill-tracks.
- A gradual withdrawal of mechanical and wheeled vehicles (including bicycles - see below) from the core area.
- A presumption against large-scale recreational events on NTS countryside properties
- Educational and interpretation programmes promoting NTS's policy on wild land to visitors, which would outline concepts such as the 'long walk in' ... and provide advice on 'minimal impact'.

The report also suggested removal of man-made elements such as sign posts, footbridges and bothies could be considered where they were "non-essential" to the management of the estate.

=== Pinewood regeneration ===
Native woodland is considered a prime habitat for conservation, and it is an objective of the National Trust for Scotland to encourage the Caledonian pinewood to expand its range by natural regeneration. The management plan envisaged that this expansion would be achieved by natural regeneration without the use of fencing, and would thus be achieved by a "substantial reduction in deer numbers and without resorting to additional fencing, tree planting or use of fertilizers". It was recognised that this would be a long-term process, and monitoring was recommended in order to assess whether measures to "kick-start" the process should be undertaken. When the Trust acquired Mar Lodge Estate, more than 3500 red deer roamed the estate and they set themselves the target to reduce that to 1600 by the year 2000. Good practice would suggest that, without fencing the deer population must be reduced to the low single-digits per square kilometre.

The Trust failed in its objective to reduce the deer population of the estate to 1600 by the year 2000. Scottish Natural Heritage considered that this failure was "despite strenuous efforts" and that the reason "for the shortfall would appear to be an underestimate of the original population size by as much as 20%", which resulted in the estimated deer population of 2700 in (year) 2000, however it has been argued that efforts to reduce numbers were hampered by a reliance of traditional deer stalking practices, this being a stipulation of the Easter Trust funding. By 2011 the deer population was estimated as 1700, and thus in line with the original target, although neighbouring estates had expressed concern that the reduction was impacting deer numbers on their estates, and hence the viability of their sporting businesses.

Forest regeneration had not been as successful as hoped, which the trust ascribed to the delay in reducing deer numbers to the target level. The original plan of avoiding any fencing was thus altered, with the estate being divided into two zones (a moorland zone and a regeneration zone), with some fencing separating the two.

=== Tracks ===
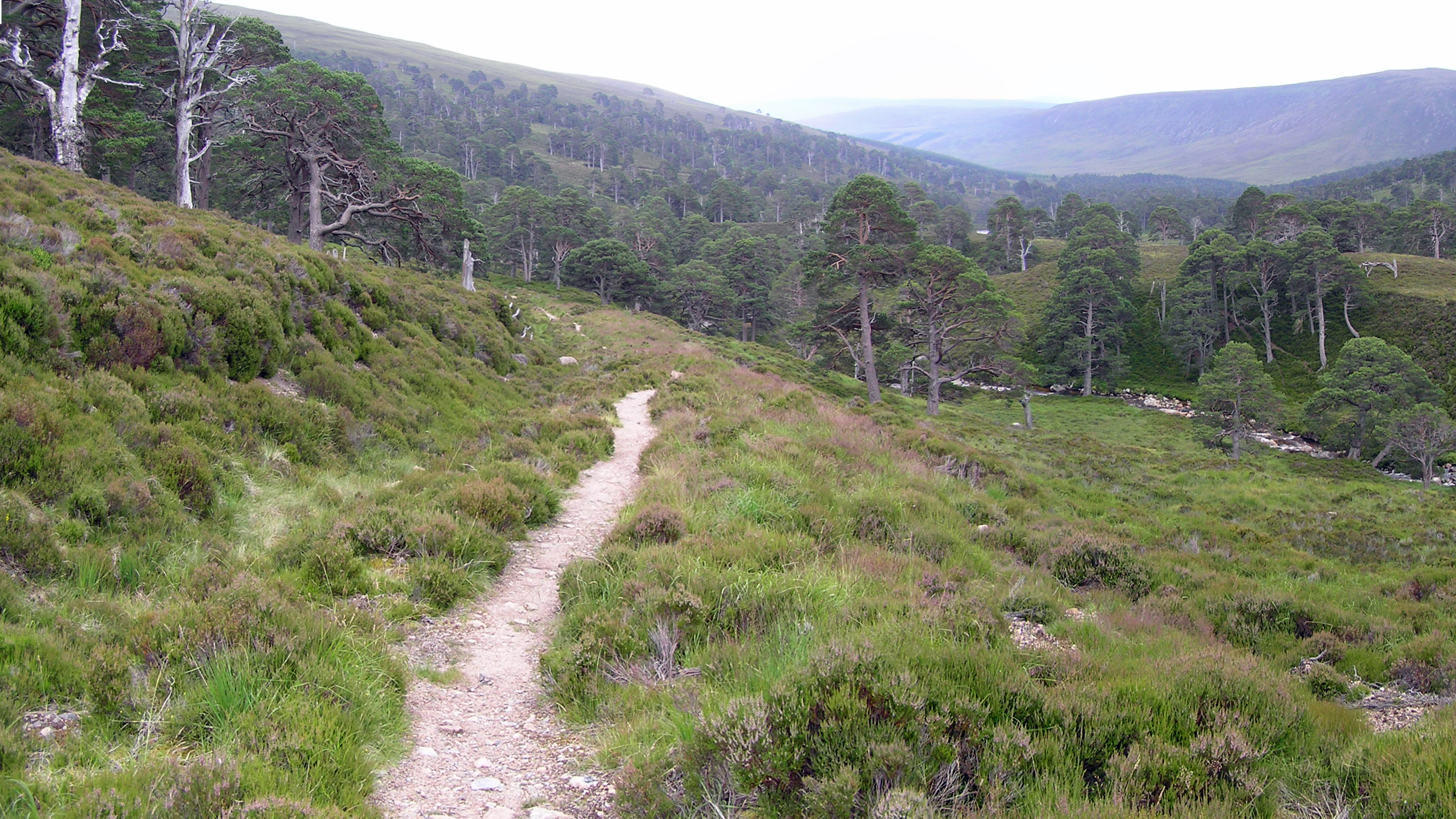
The former bulldozed vehicle hill-track in Glen Derry on Mar Lodge Estate, looking towards Derry Lodge

In 1997, in line with the objectives and policies of the Trust to enhance the wild land quality and the 'long walk in' they began track removal work on Beinn a Bhuird. This vehicle hill-track had been extended from the head of Glen Quoich using a bulldozer over eight-weeks in 1966. The Trust found itself "in new territory, where the best and sometimes only advice it can get is from the experience of its own staff as they pioneer new techniques". These techniques comprised a three-stage process of (1) lifting vegetation that had naturally colonised the spoil; (2) using the spoil to re-grade the course of the vehicle hill-track, effectively blending the course of the vehicle hill-track back into the hill-side; and (3) replanting the vegetation lifted from the spoil leaving the width of a footpath unplanted. The re-vegetation was "supplemented by plants collected from densely vegetated areas within 50 metres of the track ... [and] plate-sized turfs of species such as heather and blaeberry". The results were reviewed favourably by hillwalking publication The Angry Corrie.

The 1996 Landscape Assessment had recommended the removal and revegetation of the majority of the tracks on the estate, including the one leading west from Luibeg to the edge of the Caledonian pinewood. In 2002 this track was re-engineered using imported material, destroying the pre-existing track, which Adam Watson had identified as being a 19th-century hand-made cart track. In Vehicle hill tracks in northern Scotland, referring to this work, he wrote:

a narrow path had been created, with unnecessary environmental impact on soils and vegetation from a new ditch excavated along the uphill side ... I said to [the NTS property manager] that the NTS was open to public criticism for damaging an old feature of historical interest ... [the track] has been buried under boulders and soil along its entire surface and verges. No works were needed, other than minor treatment to reduce erosion on slopes and washed-out sections.

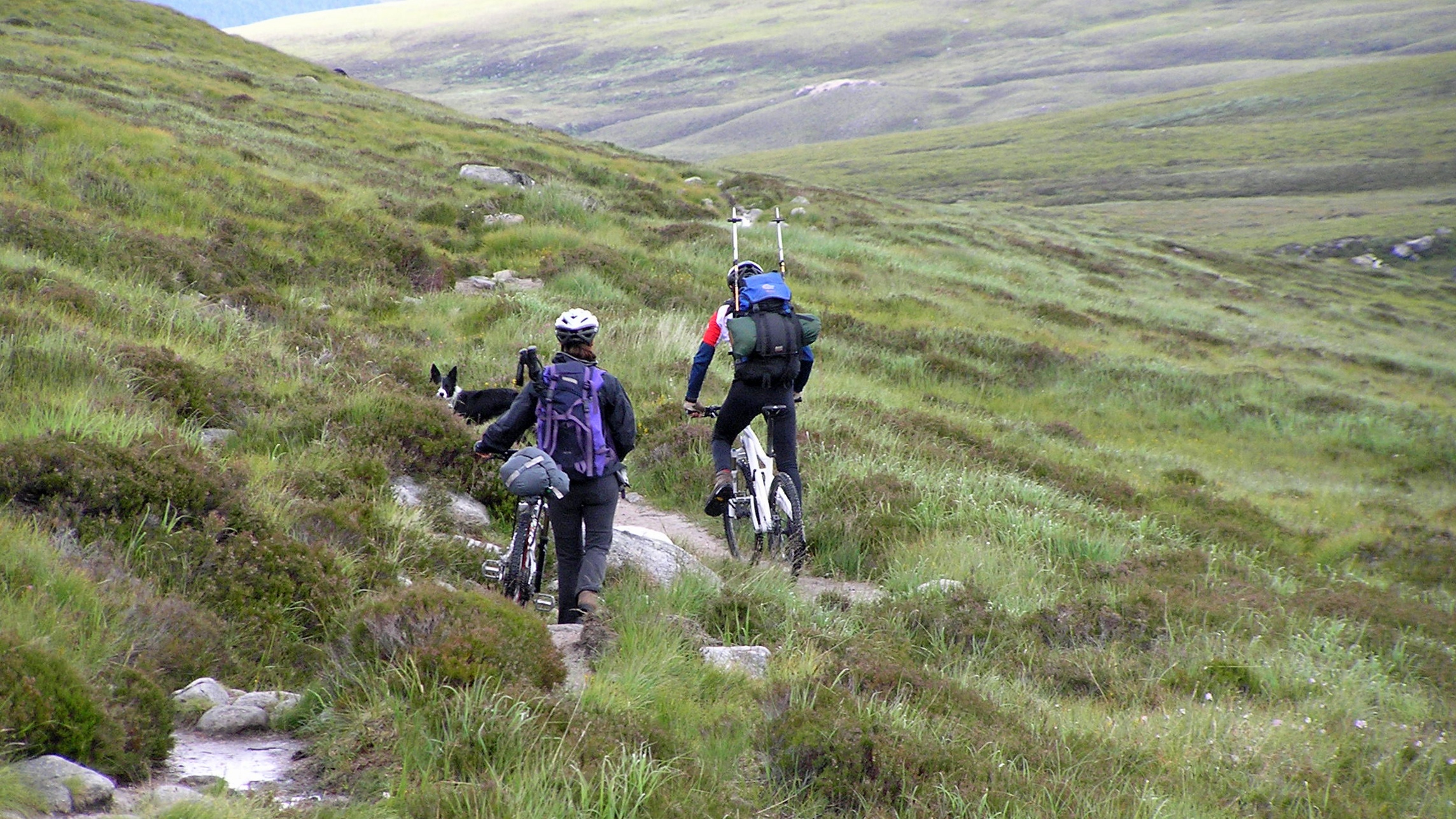
Mountain bikers between Glen Dee and Glen Luibeg

The Easter Charitable Trust's contribution towards the purchase was conditional, requiring that "NTS shall make continuous and constant efforts to dissuade, and where possible to prohibit, the use of mechanical or wheeled vehicles". The Trust initially considered that this stipulation also applied to bicycles, and signs were erected in various parts of the estate to state that the NTS has a policy of actively discouraging bike access, without actually stating that they were prohibited (outright prohibition would be contrary to the Land Reform Act (Scotland) 2003). In 2001 this policy was revised to allow bicycles to access "as far as [NTS] drive their Land Rovers".

=== Restructuring plantations ===
When the National Trust for Scotland acquired Mar Lodge Estate there were many geometrical plantations across the estate, primarily planted during the ownership of the Panchauds to provide shelter for red deer, that were unnaturally-shaped with trees planted unnaturally-close. Within the minimal intervention philosophy was the gradual naturalisation of these plantations by (a) "the removal of all non-native [tree] species" and, (b) felling to open the structure and soften the edges of these plantations and, (c) the removal of the protective deer-fences around these plantations.

From 2011 the number of timber extraction operations increased rapidly. These timber operations have been branded as 'damaging' by some - in Ugly Deeside, writing about the timber extraction operation in the plantation near Bridge of Ey, Adam Watson writes :

on 21 August 2012 I visited ... Wheel ruts were open drains, with run-off water and channels eroded down to a very hard indurated horizon. Excess water and eroded upper soil horizons continued down to and on to the public road, including pools that were yellow with silt laden water. There is little doubt that heavy rainstorms would move the silt-laden water along the public road and into the Ey Burn nearby ... The machines had turned the cultivated soils under the birchwood into mud and removed the fertile upper horizons, exposing the indurated horizon of acidic provenance. Podzols in the pinewood had had their upper horizons removed or severely compacted, which will have destroyed them as podzol soil-types.

== See also ==
- Places, place names, and structures on Mar Lodge Estate
- Buildings:
  - Mar Lodge (building)
  - St Ninian's Chapel, Braemar
  - Corrour Bothy
  - Victoria Bridge, Mar Lodge Estate
- Localities:
  - Allanaquoich
  - Corriemulzie
  - Glen Lui
  - Inverey
  - Lairig Ghru and The Devil's Point

== Sources ==
- Anderson, George; Anderson, Peter (1850). "Guide to the Highlands and Islands of Scotland". Adam and Charles Black, Edinburgh.
- Diack, Dr. Alison M.G. "Place-Names of the Cairngorms National Park" (PDF). Cairngorms National Park Authority. Archived from the original (PDF) on 3 March 2016.
- Dixon, P.J.; Green, S.T. (1995), Mar Lodge Estate Grampian : An Archaeological Survey (PDF), Royal Commission on the Ancient and Historical Monuments of Scotland, Edinburgh
- Gibbs, Hon. Vicary; Doubleday, H (1926). "The Complete Peerage of England Scotland Ireland Great Britain and the United Kingdom". St. Catherine Press, London.
- Stephens, Henry Morse (1888). "Duff, James (1776-1857)" . In Stephen, Leslie (ed.). Dictionary of National Biography. Vol. 16. London: Smith, Elder & Co. pp. 129–130.
- Wyness, Fenton (1968), Royal Valley : The Story of the Aberdeenshire Dee, Alex P. Reid & Son, Aberdeen
