= Deeside (book) =

- Author: Robert Anderson
- Illustrator: William Smith (jnr)
- Language: English
- Publisher: Adam & Charles Black, 4 Soho Square, London
- Publication date: 1911
- Publication place: Scotland
- Media type: Hardcover
- Pages: 174

Deeside is a book which was published in 1911 describing the geography and history of Deeside in Aberdeenshire, Scotland.

It is a wide-ranging book which describes the geography of the Dee Valley from the source of the River Dee in the Cairngorms to its mouth at Aberdeen as well as its history.

== Table of contents ==
- Chapter 1 – Introductory
- Chapter 2 – The Sources – The Aberdeenshire Highlands
- Chapter 3 – Braemar – The Jacobites
- Chapter 4 – Invercauld To Balmoral
- Chapter 5 – Balmoral – The Royal Residence
- Chapter 6 – Crathie Church – Abergeldie Castle
- Chapter 7 – Lochnagar – Glenmuick
- Chapter 8 – Ballater
- Chapter 9 – Aboyne And Glentanar
- Chapter 10 – Aboyne To Banchory
- Chapter 11 – Banchory – Crathes Castle
- Chapter 12 – Lower Deeside - Drum Castle
