= Ben Avon =

Mountain in Scotland

- Beinn Athfhinn
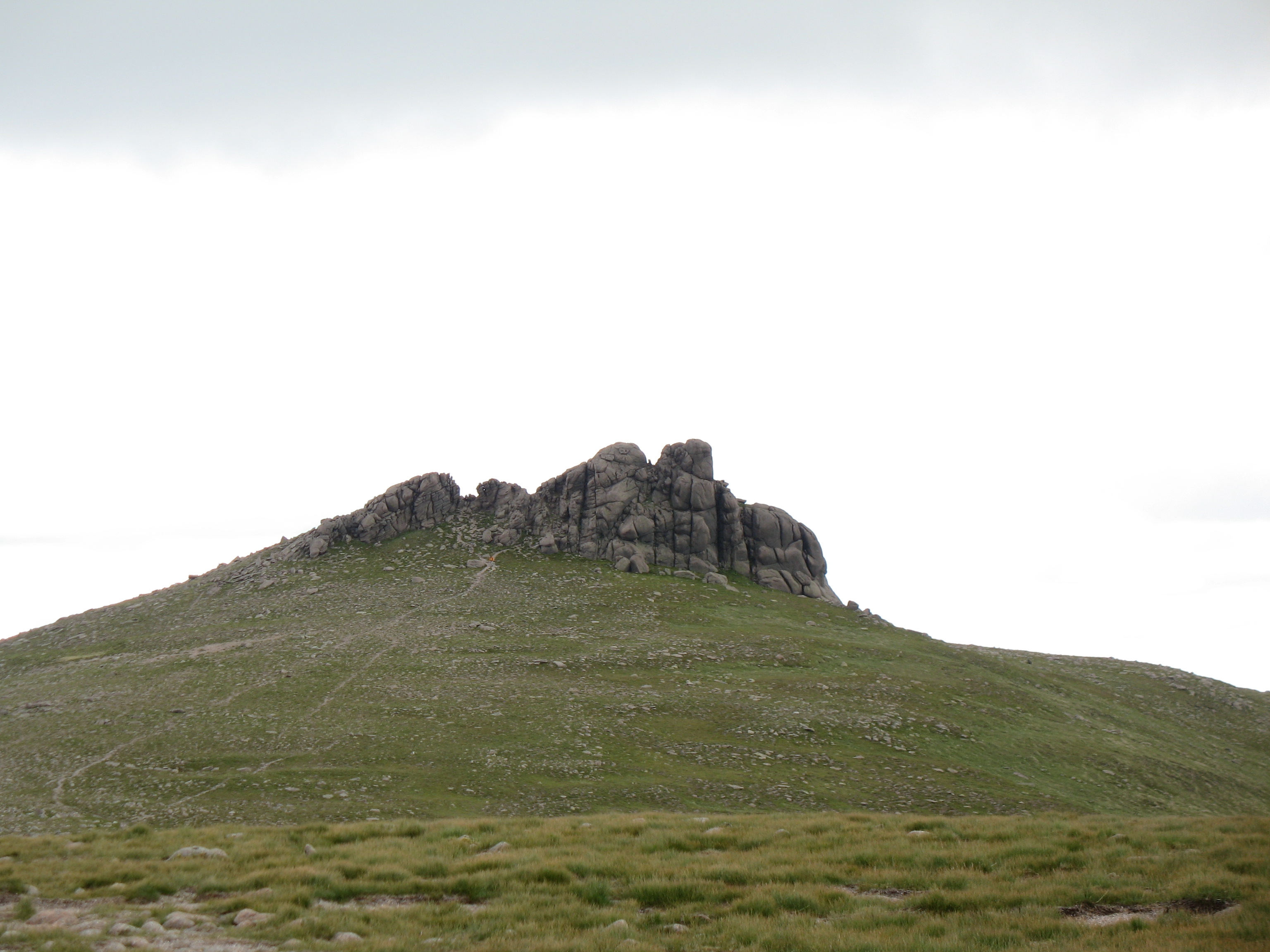
- The summit tor on Ben Avon

Highest point
- Elevation: 1,171 m (3,842 ft)
- Prominence: c. 197 m (646 ft)
- Parent peak: Beinn a' Bhùird
- Listing: Munro, Marilyn
- Coordinates: 57.09894°N 3.43596°W

Naming
- Pronunciation: Scottish Gaelic: [peɲ ˈahɪɲ]

Geography
- Location within Scotland
- Location: Banffshire, Scotland
- Parent range: Cairngorms
- OS grid: NJ131018
- Topo map: OS Landranger 36

Ben Avon (Scottish Gaelic: Beinn Athfhinn, 'mountain of the Avon') is a mountain in the Cairngorms of Scotland. It is a sprawling mountain with a broad summit plateau dotted with granite tors. One of these marks the summit, called Leabaidh an Daimh Bhuidhe ("bed of the yellow stag") or Stob Easaidh Mòr, which stands at a height of 1,171 metres (3,842 ft). It is classified as both a Munro and a Marilyn.

From the broad summit plateau ridges lead in almost every direction, allowing access from Glen Avon to the north, from Beinn a' Bhùird to the west and from Gleann an t-Slugain in the south. To the west of the summit lies the massive corrie, Slochd Mòr, with its rocky cliffs, and the approaches from the south and west take you close to the corrie rim. The most common ascent route is via the path in the deep glen that separates Ben Avon and Beinn a' Bhùird, or from Beinn a' Bhùird itself. The summit tor itself must be climbed in order to "bag" the mountain, though it is an easy scramble.

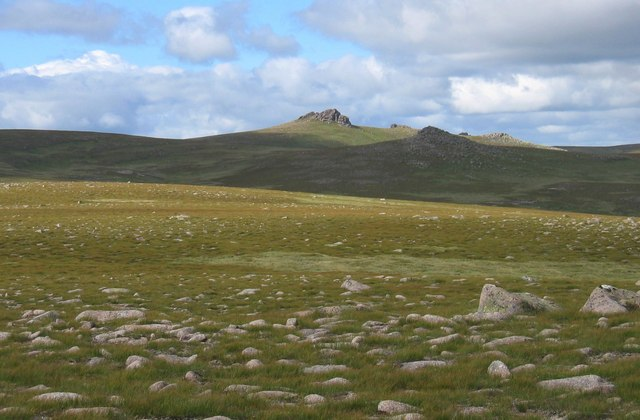
The summit plateau from the south

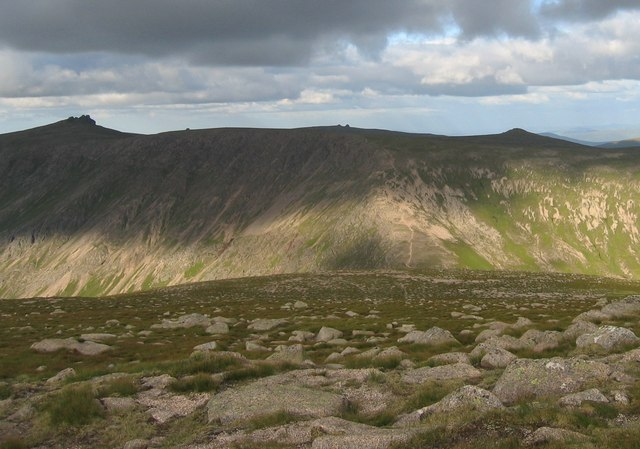
Ben Avon from the west

== See also ==
- List of Munro mountains
- Mountains and hills of Scotland
