= River Quoich =

Tributary of the River Dee in Aberdeenshire, Scotland

Coordinates: 57.00111°N 3.4522°W

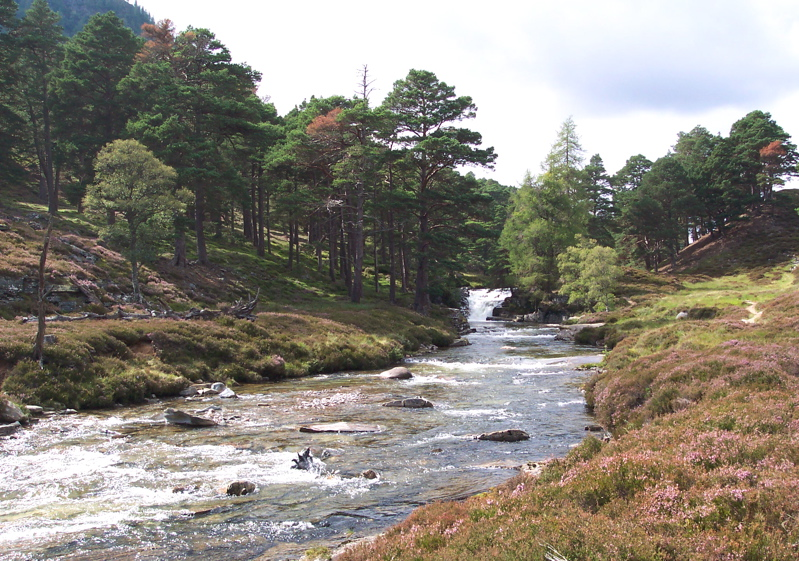
The River Quoich, near the Linn of Quoich, Braemar.

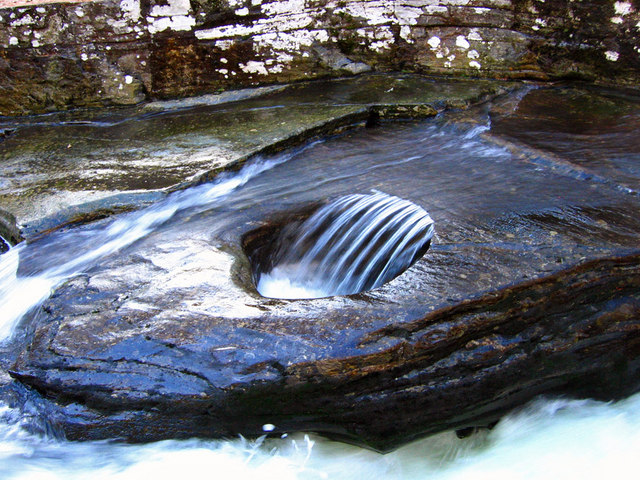
The Earl O Mar's Punchbowl

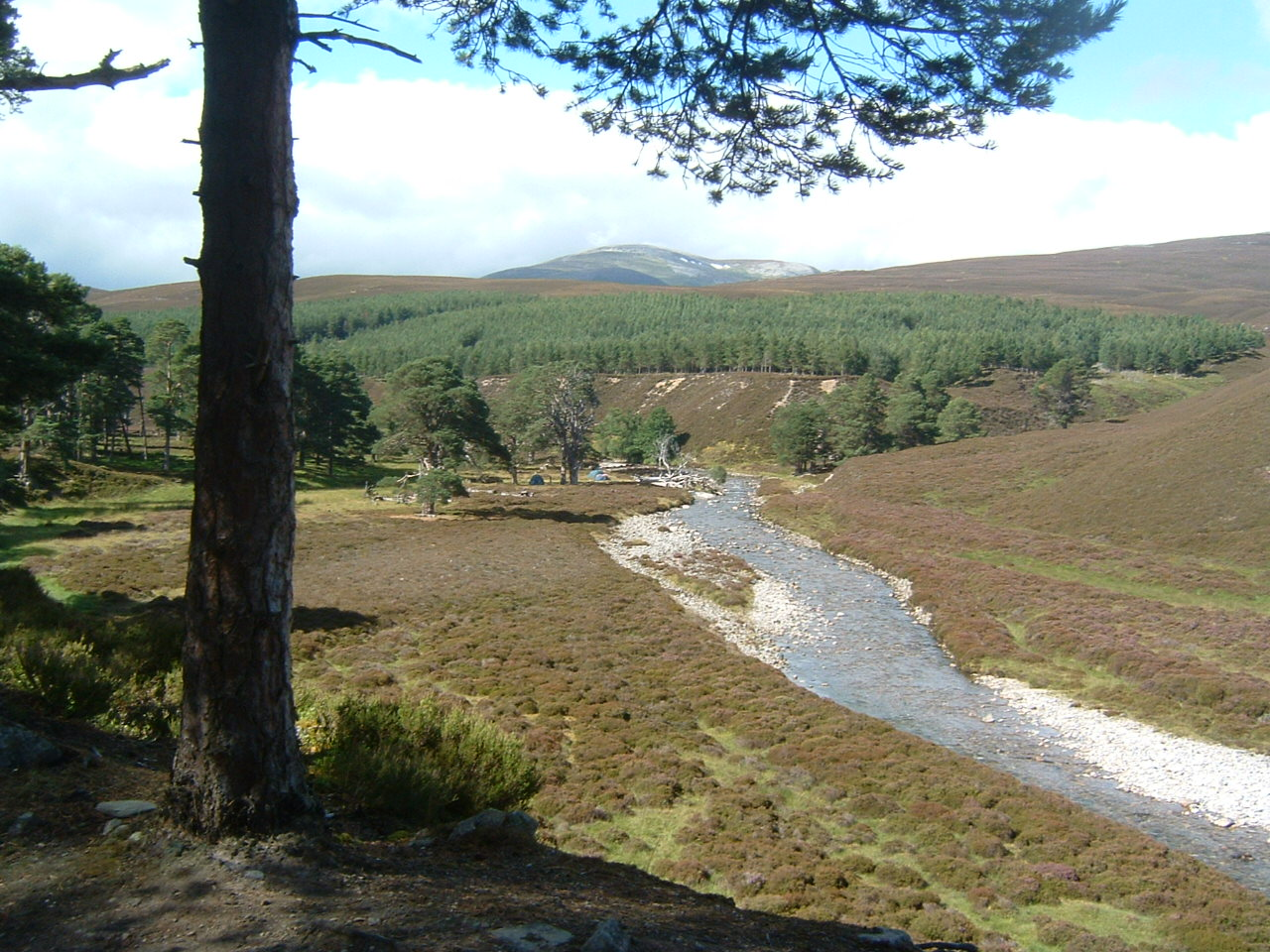
Overlooking the River Quoich from the top of a hill.

The River Quoich is a tributary of the River Dee in Aberdeenshire, Scotland. It flows in a generally southerly direction and is about 15 km long (including its upper reaches, known as Quoich Water, above the confluence with the Allt an dubh-ghlinne). The clachan of Allanaquoich is situated just above the river's confluence with the Dee. Near Allanaquoich is the Linn of Quoich, a waterfall through a narrow ravine, over which there is a bridge at the narrowest part. Near the bridge is the Earl of Mar's Punch Bowl: a natural hole in a rock midstream that was literally used as a punchbowl after hunting deer in the neighbouring forest. The river joins the Dee about 1 1/2 miles or 2 1/2 km west of Braemar.

The Linn of Quoich has been the site of several deaths in recent years, including those of an overworked, suicidal male doctor and a ten-year-old girl who fell into the river and drowned.
