= Allanaquoich =

Coordinates: 57.00°N 03.45°W

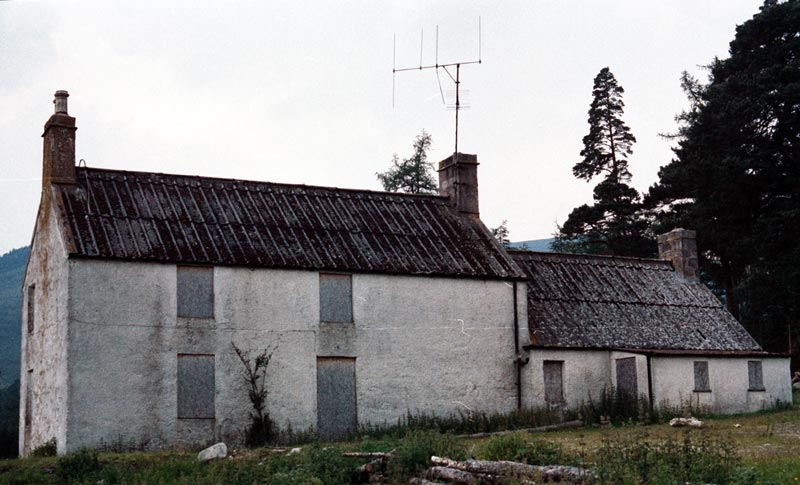
- The farm house at Allanaquoich from the East (about 1995)

- Location within Aberdeenshire
- OS grid reference: NO1291
- Council area: Aberdeenshire
- Lieutenancy area: Aberdeenshire
- Country: Scotland
- Sovereign state: United Kingdom
- Police: Scotland
- Fire: Scottish
- Ambulance: Scottish

Allanaquoich is a locality on Mar Lodge Estate, Aberdeenshire, Scotland.

Allanaquoich is little more than a farm house now although it once could have been described as a hamlet. It is located (streetmap) on a slight rise to the East of the Quoich Water.

A table in Dixon & Green (1995) shows the number of tenants at Allanaquoich being reduced as part of the Highland Clearances from 18 tenants in 1739 to just 1 by 1810 as a result.

An [sic] pre-1759 estate map of Allanaquoich, prepared for Lord Braco, showed a two-storeyed farm-house at Allanaquoich, two outbuildings and four cottages

— Dixon & Green

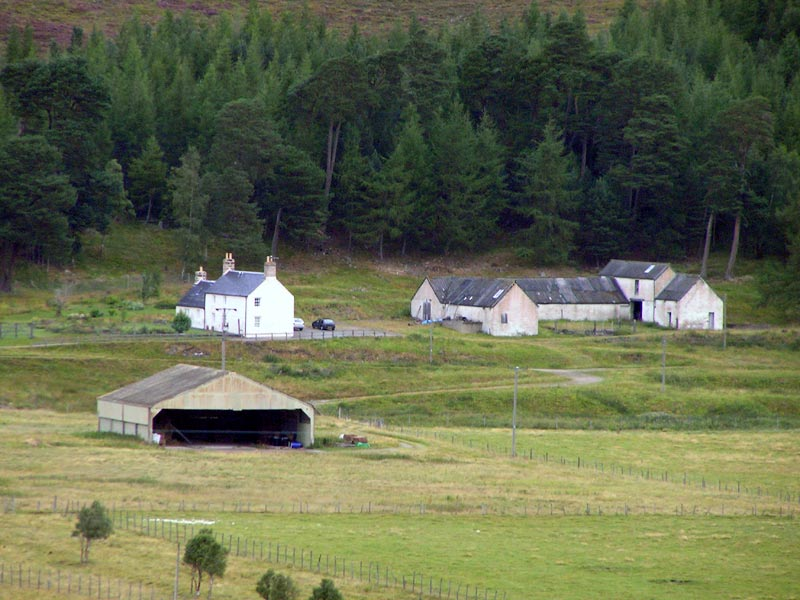
Allanaquoich from the Linn of Dee road (September 2006)

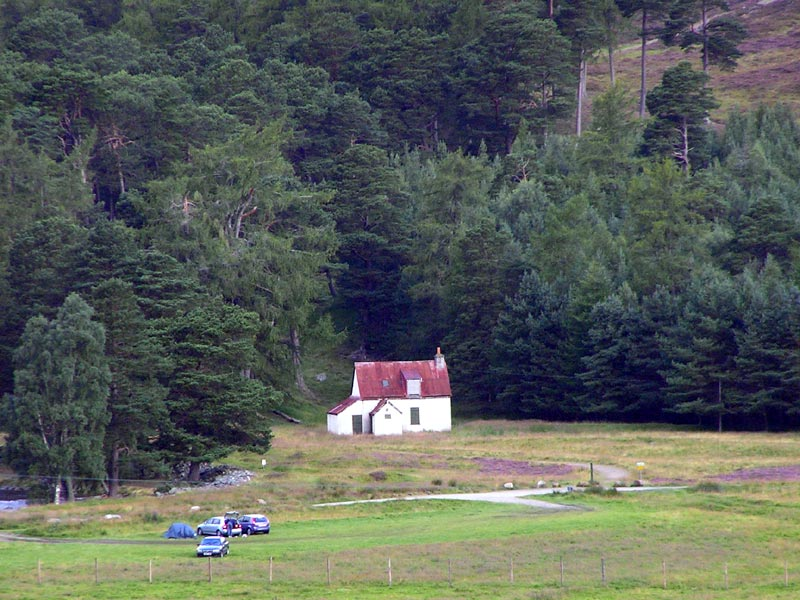
Quoich Cottage from the Linn of Dee road (21AUG07)

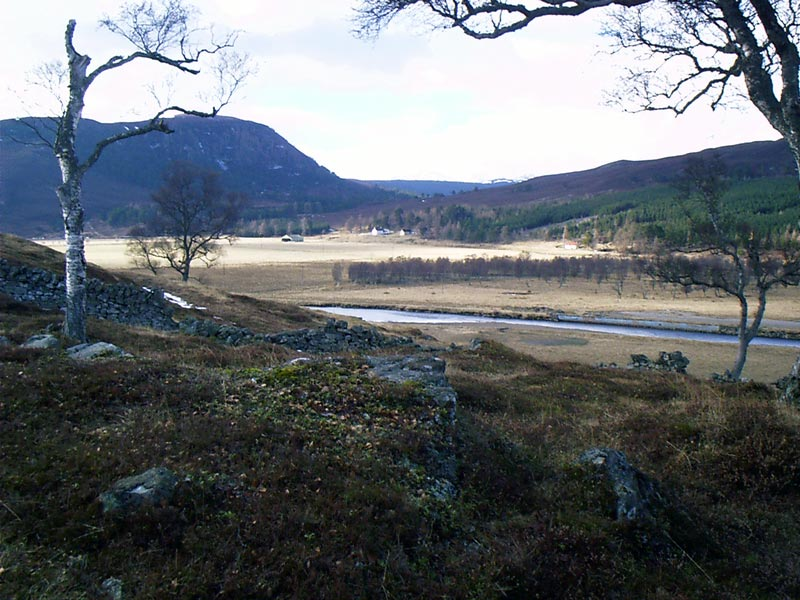
General view of Allanaquoich from the Linn of Dee road (07MAR04)

== See also ==
- Places, place names, and structures on Mar Lodge Estate

== Sources ==
- Dixon, P.J.; Green, S.T. (1995), Mar Lodge Estate Grampian : An Archaeological Survey, Royal Commission on the Ancient and Historical Monuments of Scotland, Edinburgh
