= Corriemulzie =

Locality in Aberdeenshire, Scotland

Coordinates: 56.9867°N 3.4619°W

Corriemulzie is a locality on Mar Lodge Estate, Aberdeenshire, Scotland.

Corriemulzie lies on the Linn of Dee road about 3 miles west of Braemar. The locality includes the Corriemulzie Burn that flows through the Linn of Corriemulzie, and under the Corriemulzie Bridge. There are a few buildings at Corriemulzie including the old saw mill of the Mar Estate.

In the 19th century the Duffs, who owned Mar Estate at the time, built the second Mar Lodge at Corriemulzie.

Corriemulzie is the birthplace of Johann von Lamont (1805-1879), the famous Scottish-German astronomer and astrophysicist who pioneered the study of the Earth's magnetic field.

At one time, Corriemulzie could have been described as a hamlet since there were many houses (including some now ruins) within a short distance from the Linn including Braegarie, Dairy Cottage, Alltachlair (ruin), and Arderg (ruin).

A hydro-electricity scheme was constructed at Corriemulzie in 2016. Braemar Community Hydro Ltd. has installed a 100 kW hydro scheme which is now generating electricity that is fed into the national grid. BCH is a Community Benefit Society, and surplus income from the enterprise is used for projects and worthy causes in the local community.

== Gallery ==
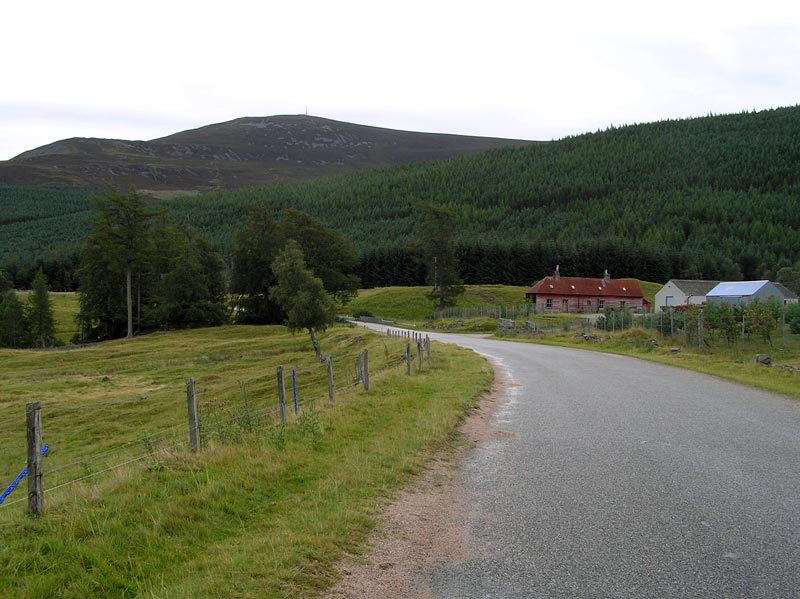
Corriemulzie

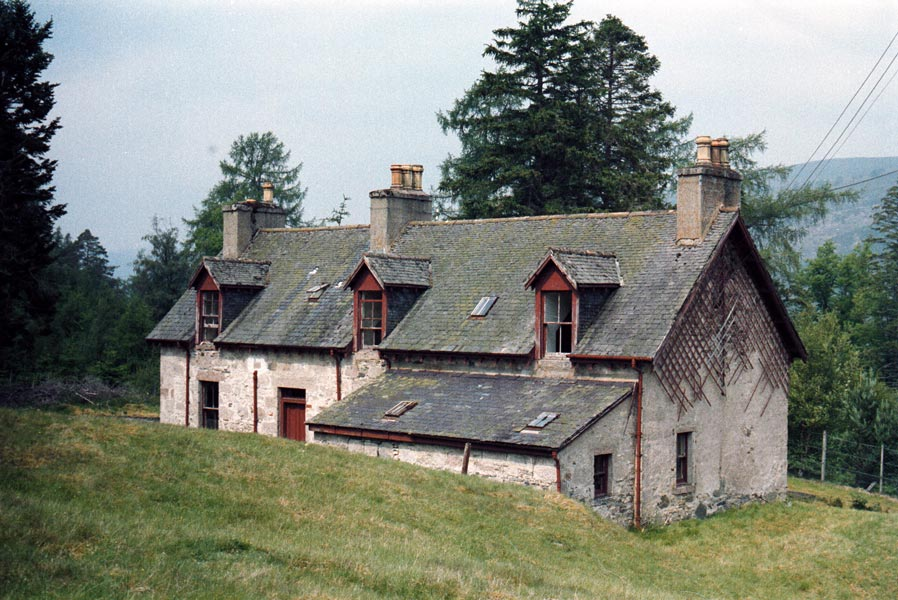
Old Manager's House

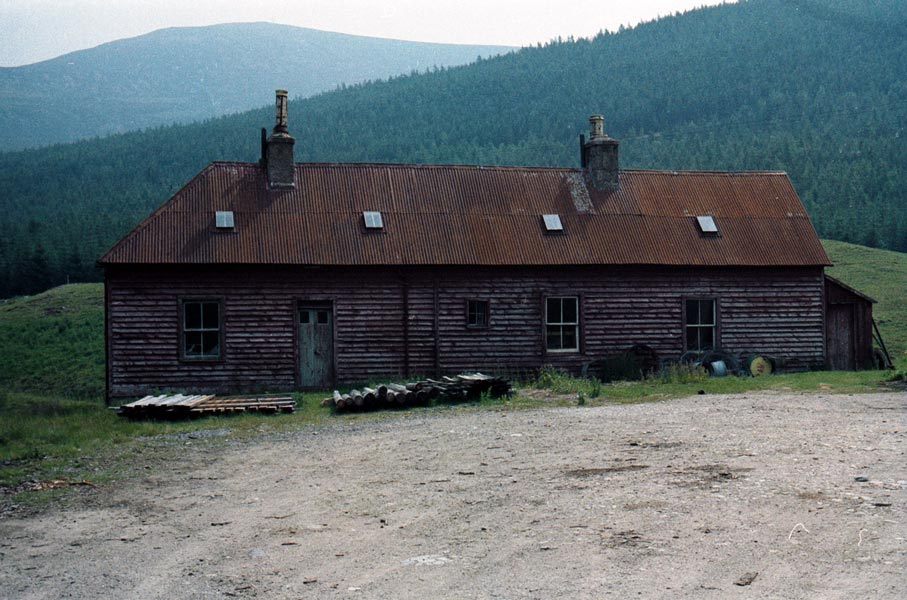
Old Sawmill

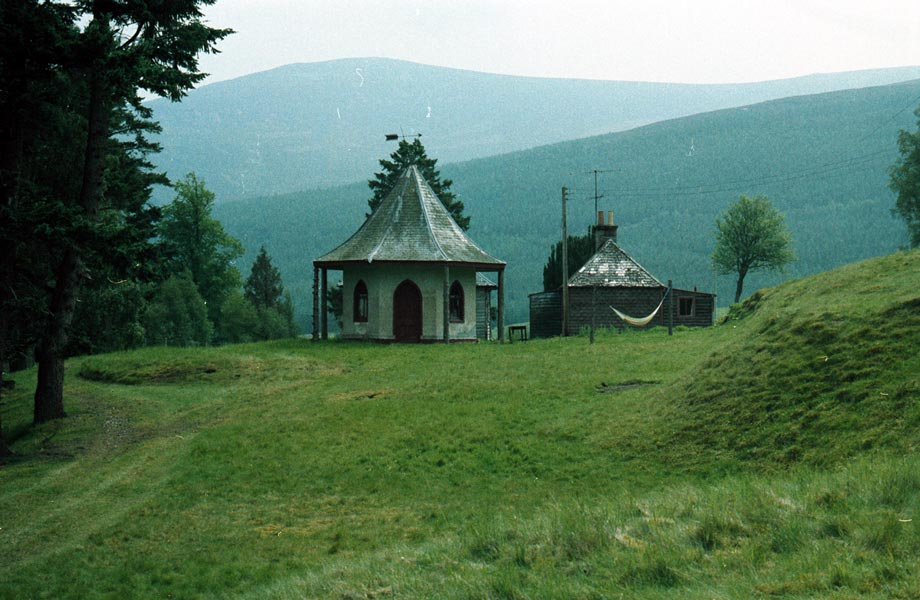

== See also ==
- Places, place names, and structures on Mar Lodge Estate
- Corriemulzie River – a tributary of the River Oykel in Sutherland that gives its name to the Corriemulzie Estate
