= Braemar =

Village in Aberdeenshire, Scotland

Braemar: Scottish Gaelic: Bràigh Mhàrr
- Location within Aberdeenshire
- Population: 808 (2011) (Crathie and Braemar Civil Parish)
- OS grid reference: NO150913
  - Edinburgh: 73 mi (117 km)
  - London: 402 mi (647 km)
- Council area: Aberdeenshire
- Country: Scotland
- Sovereign state: United Kingdom
- Post town: BALLATER
- Postcode district: AB35
- Dialling code: 013397
- Police: Scotland
- Fire: Scottish
- Ambulance: Scottish
- UK Parliament: West Aberdeenshire and Kincardine
- Scottish Parliament: Aberdeenshire West

Braemar /breɪˈmɑːr/ is a village in Aberdeenshire, Scotland, around 58 miles (93 km) west of Aberdeen in the Highlands. It is the closest significantly-sized settlement to the upper course of the River Dee, sitting at an elevation of 339 metres (1,112 ft).

The Gaelic Bràigh Mhàrr properly refers to the area of upper Marr (as it literally means), i.e. the area of Marr to the west of Aboyne, the village itself being Castleton of Braemar (Baile a' Chaisteil in Scottish Gaelic). The village used to be known as Cinn Drochaid ('bridge end'); Baile a' Chaisteil referred to only the part of the village on the east bank of the river, the part on the west bank being known as Ach an Droighinn ('thorn field').

== History ==
The modern village sits over the Clunie Water, a strategically important crossing on the Elsick Mounth, an ancient trackway used by Picts and Romans. It is located in the upper end of the historical Earldom of Mar, literally the Braes o' Mar. The Scottish Gaelic name Bràigh Mhàrr ('Upland of Mar') was originally applied to the general area; using Braemar for the village dates to around 1870.

Before the 11th century, there were separate hamlets on each bank of the Clunie, Auchendryne on the west and Castleton on the east, or Bail Chasteil. The names are clearly marked on the current Ordnance Survey maps, below 'Braemar'. 'Castleton' refers to Kindrochit Castle, located within the modern village, rather than Braemar Castle to the south, while Kindrochit means 'bridge end'. Kindrochit (or Kindrochit-Alian) was known as Doldauha before the mid-9th century.

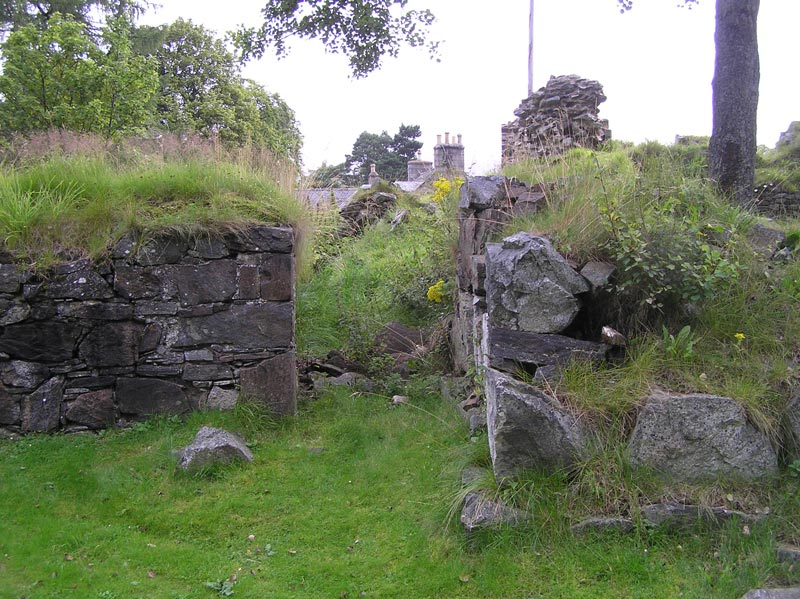
Ruins of Kindrochit Castle

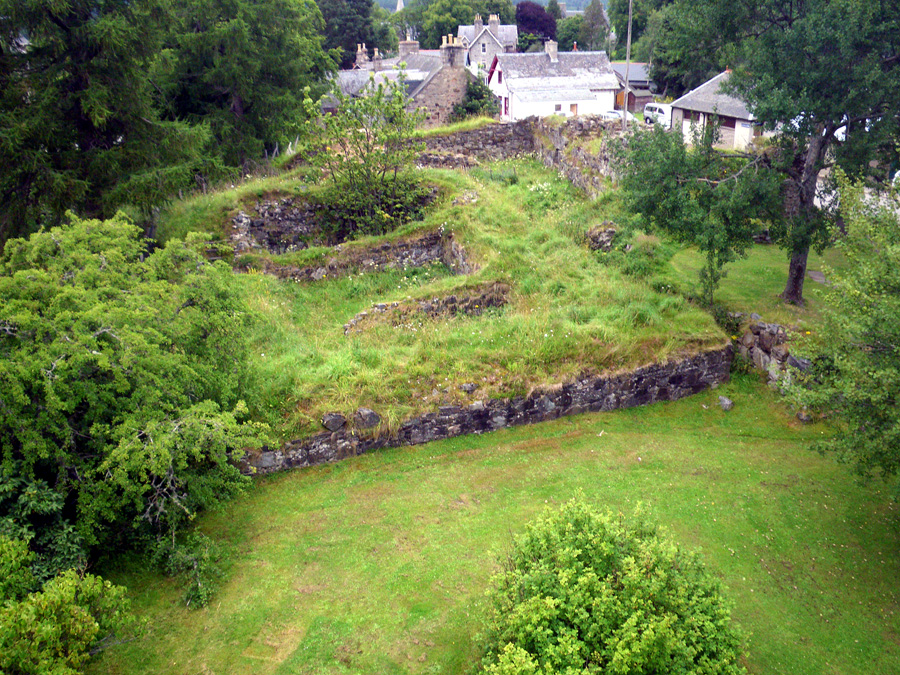
Pole aerial photo of the ruins of The Royal Castle of Kindrochit in Mar

According to legend, Malcolm III came to the area in around 1059, and built a timber bridge connecting the east and west banks. 'Kindrochit' means bridge end and the castle is assumed to have been built to protect the crossing. The ruins are considered to be largely of 14th-century origin, replacing the presumed timber-construction of the original castle.

Following the accession of George I in 1714, the Earl of Mar launched the 1715 Jacobite Rising on 6 September at Braemar. In 1795, a Roman Catholic Mass house was built on the high-ground to the west of Auchendryne, giving the name to Chapel Brae, which was used as a school.

Until the 20th century, Braemar was largely owned by one of the adjoining Mar Estates, with Auchendryne and Invercauld on one side, Castleton on the other. Allegedly, inter-estate rivalry was a factor in each having its own pub, the Fife Arms Hotel in Auchendryne, and the Invercauld Arms Hotel in Castleton, built over the mound where the Earl of Mar raised the Jacobite standard in 1715.

Auchindryne (to use the spelling by Wyness) from Ach' an Droighinn ('field of the thorn') belonged to a branch of the Farquharsons until it was forfeited in the aftermath of the Jacobite rising of 1745. Later that century it was acquired by William Duff, 1st Earl Fife.

The Catholic Church in Braemar is dedicated to Saint Andrew and, following Catholic Emancipation, it was built in 1839. Catholicism has traditionally been strong in the Braemar area, and the bones of Saint Andrew rested in Braemar before being taken to the place now known as St Andrews. St Ninian's Chapel, Braemar, completed in 1898, is the Scottish Episcopal Church place of worship.

Johann von Lamont (1805–1879), the Scottish-German astronomer and astrophysicist who pioneered the study of the Earth's magnetic field was born in nearby Corriemulzie.

On 16 March 2022, the 19th-century Braemar Lodge Hotel was engulfed in a fire and explosion.

== Geography ==
Braemar is approached from the south on the A93 from Glen Clunie and the Cairnwell Pass and from the East also on the A93 from Deeside. Braemar can be approached on foot from the west through Glen Tilt, Glen Feshie, Glen Dee (by the Lairig Ghru), and Glen Derry (by the Lairig an Laoigh). Braemar is within a one-and-a-half-hour drive of Aberdeen, Dundee, and Perth.

The village is overlooked from roughly northwest by Carn na Drochaide (818 m), from roughly northeast by Creag Choinneach (538 m), from roughly southwest by Carn na Sgliat (690 m), and from roughly southwest by Morrone (859 m).

== Language ==
In the 1891 census, 59.2% of the population of Braemar spoke the Gaelic language "habitually"; the percentage of those actually able to speak the language (despite not having much opportunity to) would have been somewhat higher. The small crofting township of Inverey (Inbhir Èidh) was 86.3% Gaelic-speaking, most non-speakers being originally from Lower Deeside. The Gaelic spoken in the Aberdeenshire Highlands shared most features in common with the Gaelic of Strathspey and East Perthshire. The last native-speaker of the local Gaelic dialect died in 1984, though there are still surviving native-speakers of the similar Strathspey dialect. At the 2001 census, out of a total population of 839 in Crathie and Braemar Civil Parish, only 5 (0.6%) claimed to be Gaelic-speakers.

== Braemar Gathering ==
Known colloquially as "The Games" and originating from those believed to have been held by Malcolm III, an annual Highland games gathering is held at Braemar on the first Saturday in September and is traditionally attended by the British royal family.

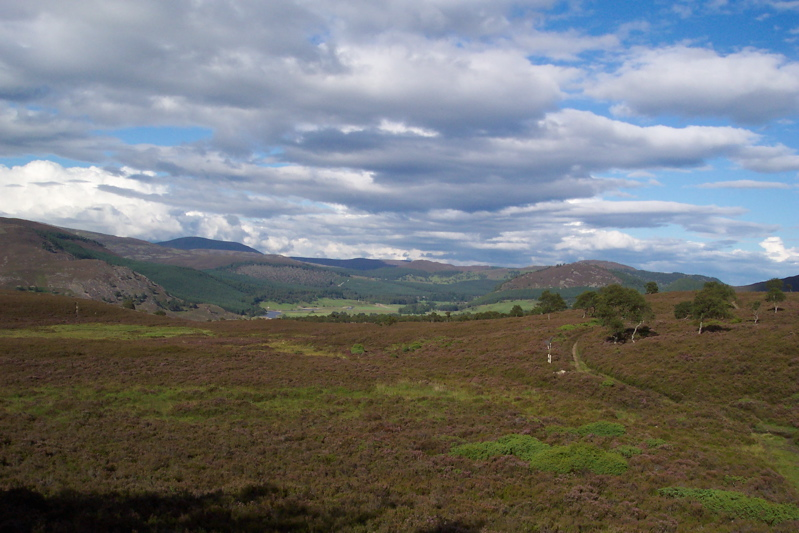
Morrone Birkwood Nature Reserve

In 1746, the Act of Proscription stopped all clan gatherings, but following its repeal in 1782, the old enthusiasms for such events returned. In 1815, the Braemar Highland Society was created and officially constituted in 1817; the first modern-day games taking place in 1832 with cash prizes being awarded to the competitors, using the funds of the Braemar Highland Society. On 14 September 1848, Queen Victoria attended the Gathering at Invercauld. In 1866, Royal was added to Braemar Highland Society and in 1906, the Duke of Fife presented 12 acres (5 hectares) of Mar Estate to the society, and the Princess Royal and Duke of Fife Memorial Park, the current home of the Braemar Gathering, was created.

Since Queen Victoria's time, the reigning monarch has been the patron of the Braemar Royal Highland Society, and is styled Chieftain at the games. The current Chieftain of the Braemar Gathering is King Charles III.

Lots of events are held, including:

- hill running;
- heavy events;
- light events; and
- Highland dancing. The Highland dancing is high quality owing to careful selection by the organisers. As the dancing boards are located right in front of the patrons' pavilions, some of the dancers have been watched by members of the royal family, including Queen Elizabeth II and King Charles III.

Another event that happens at Braemar is the presentation of the Aberdeenshire League/Walker's Shortbread League winners. The overall top six dancers from across certain Highland games held over the summer are presented with their awards. Each dancer receives a tin of Walker's shortbread (hence the nickname 'Shortbread League') and a commemorative vase, picture or something similar.

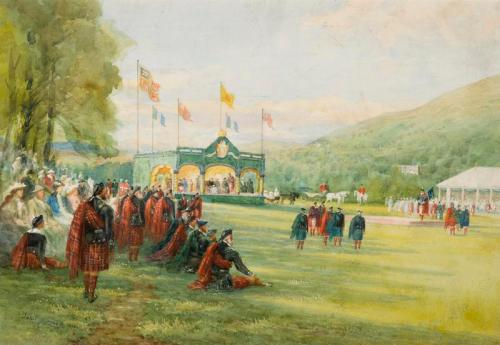
Braemar Highland Games by John Mitchell, 1898

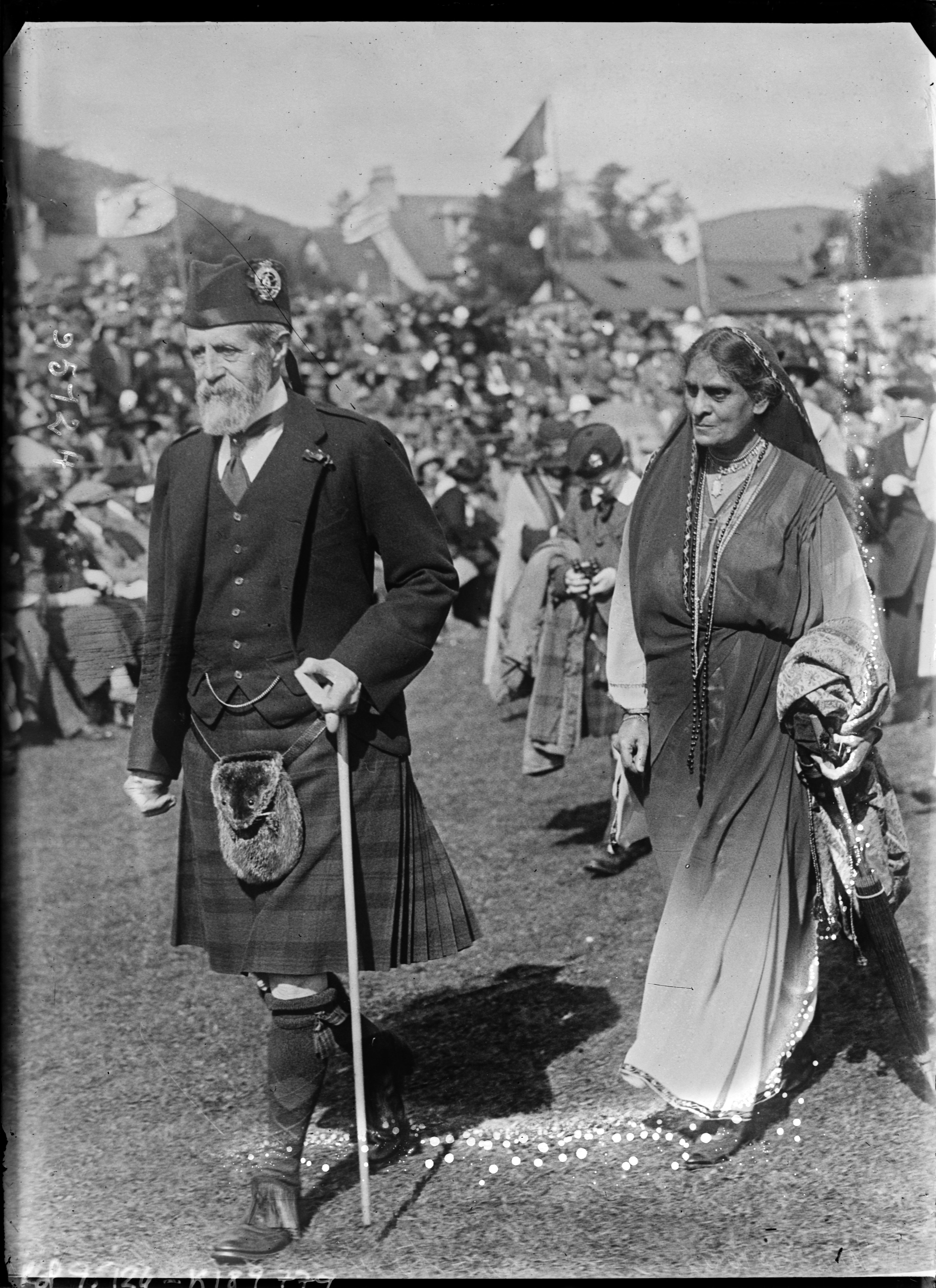
John Hamilton-Gordon, 1st Marquess of Aberdeen and Temair and Cornelia Sorabji, the first Indian woman to practise law in India, at the 1924 Braemar Gathering

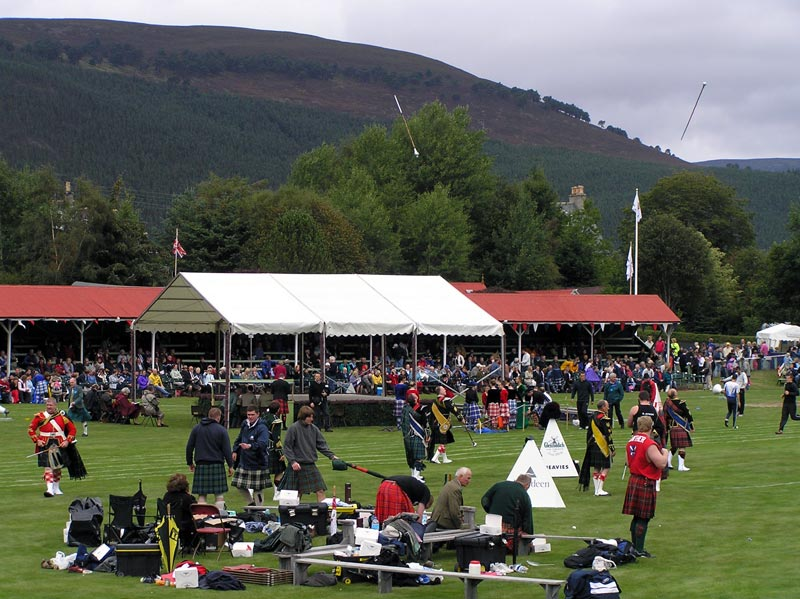
Participants at the 2006 Games

== Amenities ==
Braemar has a golf course, two large hotels (Fife Arms and Invercauld Arms) as well as many smaller hotels and private homes offering bed and breakfast-style accommodation and a large SYHA hostel. On the southern edge of the village there is also a caravan site. Braemar also has a small post office/village shop and mountain bike hire.

The Morrone Birkwood Nature Reserve is a nature reserve on the edge of the village reached from the car park at the top of Chapel Brae.

There are three churches in Braemar. St Andrew's Catholic Church, St Ninian's Chapel (Scottish Episcopal Church) which is located in the grounds of the Mar Lodge Estate (sharing a Priest with Aboyne & Ballater), and Braemar Church of Scotland (sharing a minister with Crathie Kirk).

== Transport ==
There is a bus service connecting Dundee, Braemar, and Aberdeen.

== Climate ==
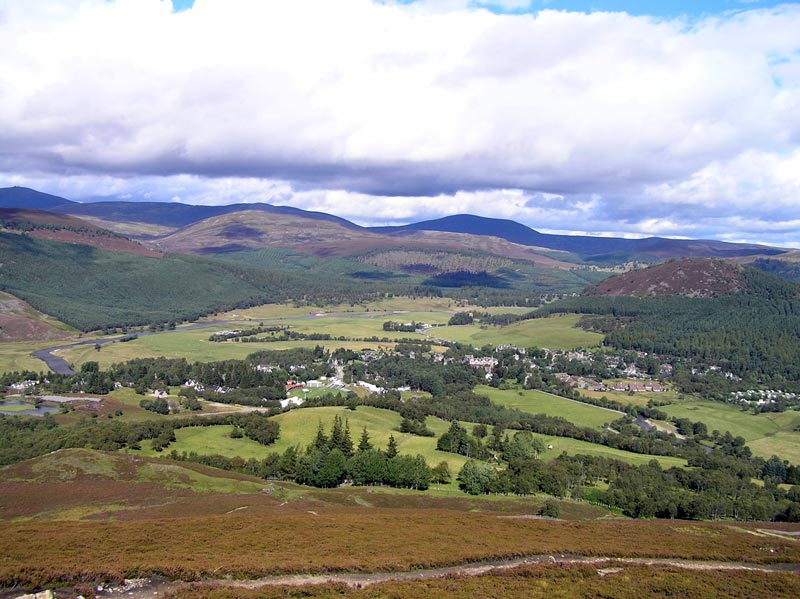
Braemar village is situated within the Cairngorms National Park.

Like most of the United Kingdom, Braemar experiences an oceanic climate (Köppen Cfb) though somewhat cooler than lowland areas, verging on a subpolar oceanic climate.

Braemar is the third-coldest low-lying place in the UK after the villages of Dalwhinnie and Leadhills with an annual mean temperature of 7.1 °C (44.8 °F). Braemar has twice entered the UK weather records with a low temperature of −27.2 °C (−17.0 °F), recorded on 11 February 1895 and again on 10 January 1982. These are the coldest temperatures ever recorded in the UK in January and February, respectively. This record is shared with Altnaharra in the Scottish Highlands.

Braemar also holds the record for the coldest November temperature ever recorded in the UK, a low of −23.3 °C (−9.9 °F) on 14 November 1919. Temperatures dipped to −8.8 °C (16.2 °F) on 1 May 1927, which is one of the coldest May nights recorded in the UK.

Braemar has an annual average of 98 days of air frost and 157 days with 1 mm or more of rainfall. Snowfall can be heavy in winter and early spring, and often accumulates to depths of 30 cm (12 in) or more. 70 cm (28 in) was recorded by weather watcher Chris Booth on 9 February 2021.

On 30 September 2015, Braemar had one of the largest recorded diurnal ranges of temperature in the UK, as well as recording the warmest and coldest temperatures for the UK for September 2015; the maximum temperature was 24.0 °C (75.2 °F) and the minimum was −1.3 °C (29.7 °F). The next day it was again the coldest and warmest place in the UK. The minimum temperature was −2.0 °C (28.4 °F) and the maximum was a new October record for Braemar, 22.7 °C (72.9 °F). Braemar recorded −5.0 °C (23.0 °F) later that month, so for the second month in a row Braemar recorded the warmest and coldest monthly temperatures for the UK. On 2 November 2015 a new record high temperature for November in Braemar was set 17.7 °C (63.9 °F). On 11 February 2021 Braemar made national news after a temperature of −23.0 °C (−9.4 °F) was recorded. It was the lowest February temperature since 1955 and the UK's coldest night since 30 December 1995.

Climate data for Braemar WMO ID: 99089; coordinates 57°00′38″N 3°23′50″W; elevation: 339 m (1,112 ft); 1991–2020 normals, extremes 1880–present
Month	Jan	Feb	Mar	Apr	May	Jun	Jul	Aug	Sep	Oct	Nov	Dec	Year
Record high °C (°F)	16.6 (61.9)	16.1 (61.0)	22.0 (71.6)	24.5 (76.1)	27.2 (81.0)	30.0 (86.0)	30.0 (86.0)	30.0 (86.0)	26.7 (80.1)	23.8 (74.8)	17.7 (63.9)	14.1 (57.4)	30.0 (86.0)
Mean daily maximum °C (°F)	4.8 (40.6)	5.2 (41.4)	7.3 (45.1)	10.2 (50.4)	13.8 (56.8)	16.2 (61.2)	18.2 (64.8)	17.4 (63.3)	15.0 (59.0)	10.9 (51.6)	7.4 (45.3)	5.0 (41.0)	11.0 (51.8)
Daily mean °C (°F)	1.9 (35.4)	2.1 (35.8)	3.6 (38.5)	5.9 (42.6)	8.9 (48.0)	11.8 (53.2)	13.6 (56.5)	13.0 (55.4)	10.7 (51.3)	7.5 (45.5)	4.3 (39.7)	2.0 (35.6)	7.1 (44.8)
Mean daily minimum °C (°F)	−1.1 (30.0)	−1.1 (30.0)	−0.1 (31.8)	1.5 (34.7)	3.9 (39.0)	7.3 (45.1)	9.0 (48.2)	8.6 (47.5)	6.5 (43.7)	4.1 (39.4)	1.2 (34.2)	−1.1 (30.0)	3.3 (37.9)
Record low °C (°F)	−27.2 (−17.0)	−27.2 (−17.0)	−21.7 (−7.1)	−13.3 (8.1)	−8.9 (16.0)	−3.3 (26.1)	−1.7 (28.9)	−2.4 (27.7)	−6.1 (21.0)	−11.4 (11.5)	−23.3 (−9.9)	−25.8 (−14.4)	−27.2 (−17.0)
Average precipitation mm (inches)	100.9 (3.97)	74.9 (2.95)	66.4 (2.61)	57.6 (2.27)	59.2 (2.33)	58.9 (2.32)	70.3 (2.77)	74.4 (2.93)	68.9 (2.71)	109.1 (4.30)	101.0 (3.98)	98.0 (3.86)	939.4 (36.98)
Average precipitation days (≥ 1.0mm)	14.3	13.3	13.2	11.0	11.8	11.8	12.4	11.8	11.4	15.3	15.6	15.0	156.8
Mean monthly sunshine hours	29.0	58.2	104.2	142.6	186.4	157.0	157.0	144.3	115.9	66.6	38.8	22.1	1,221.8
Source 1: Met Office
Source 2: Starlings Roost Weather

== Notable people ==
- John Farquharson, S.J. (1699-1782), son of Lewis Farquharson the Elder, Laird of Inverey and Auchindryne, who became an outlawed Roman Catholic priest of the Society of Jesus assigned to Clan Chisholm and Clan Fraser of Lovat in The Aird, Strathglass, and Strathfarrar between 1729 and 1753. His lost manuscript collection of local Scottish Gaelic literature and lays from the Fenian Cycle of Celtic Mythology later played an important role in the Ossianic controversy. In 2025, Margot Robbie, the Australian actress, was reported to have bought a house in the town.

== See also ==
- Allanaquoich
- Braemar Castle
- Cairnwell Pass
- Glen Lui
- Inverey
- Lairig Ghru
- Linn of Dee
- Mar Lodge
- Mar Lodge Estate
- St Ninian's Chapel
