= Aboyne (disambiguation) =

Aboyne is a village in Aberdeenshire, Scotland.

Aboyne may also refer to:

== Culture ==
- Aboyne dress, the costume for female dancers in Scottish national dances
- "The Earl of Aboyne" (song), a song named for the title

== Places ==
- Aboyne Academy, a secondary school in Aboyne, Aberdeenshire, Scotland
- Aboyne Bridge, a road bridge to the south of Aboyne, Aberdeenshire, Scotland
- Aboyne Castle, a 13th-century castle north of Aboyne, Aberdeenshire, Scotland
- Aboyne Curling Pond railway station, a former railway station in Aberdeenshire, scotland
- Aboyne Golf Club, a golf course in Royal Deeside, Scotland
- Aboyne Hospital, a community hospital in Aboyne, Scotland
- Aboyne railway station, a station which served Aboyne, Scotland
- Aboyne, Upper Deeside and Donside (ward), a ward of Aberdeenshire Council
- Loch of Aboyne, a freshwater loch in Grampian, Scotland

== Peerages ==
- Earl of Aboyne, a title in the Peerage of Scotland
- Viscount Aboyne, a title in the Peerage of Scotland
