= List of Crossings of the River Dee, Aberdeenshire =

== List of crossings of the River Dee ==
Category	Heritage Status Criteria
SM	Scheduled monument. Nationally important archaeological bridge.
A	Buildings of national or international importance, either architectural or historic, or fine little-altered examples of some particular period, style or building type.
B	Buildings of regional or more than local importance, or major examples of some particular period, style or building type which may have been altered.
C	Buildings of local importance, lesser examples of any period, style, or building type, as originally constructed or moderately altered; and simple traditional buildings which group well with others in categories A and B.

Crossing	Date	Coordinates	Heritage status	Locality	Notes	Photo
Corrour Bothy Bridge		57.0406°N 3.6767°W		Cairngorms		Footbridge_near_the_Corrour_bothy_-_2_-_geograph.org.uk_-_1546504
White Bridge		56.9768°N 3.6156°W		Cairngorms	Red House Bothy	White Bridge
Linn Of Dee Bridge	1857	56.9882°N 3.5457°W	B	Linn of Dee		Bridge_over_the_Linn_of_Dee_-_geograph.org.uk_-_1538120
Victoria Bridge	1905	56.9885°N 3.479°W	B	Mar Lodge		Upstream face of the Victoria Bridge
Invercauld Bridge	1859	57.0035°N 3.3425°W	B			
Old Invercauld Bridge	1753	57.0032°N 3.3409°W	SM			Bridge_of_Dee_near_Braemar_-_geograph.org.uk_-_6445504
Garbh Allt Suspension Bridge		57.0017°N 3.3227°W	B			Garbh_Allt_Shiel_Bridge_(Garbh_Allt_Suspension_Bridge)_-_geograph.org.uk_-_5461131
Girder Bridge	1858	57.0395°N 3.2176°W	A	Crathie		Crathie Bridge [2]
Suspension Bridge	1834	57.0335°N 3.211°W	A	Crathie		Estate_bridge_over_the_River_Dee_at_Easter_Balmoral_(geograph_1861610)
Suspension Bridge	1885	57.0438°N 3.1761°W	B	Abergeldie Castle		Abergeldie suspension bridge
Polhollick Bridge		57.055°N 3.0834°W	B	Polhollick		Pollhollick Suspension Bridge
Royal Bridge, Ballater	1885	57.0471°N 3.0364°W	B	Ballater		River Dee, Ballater
Suspension Bridge, Cambus O' May	1905	57.0659°N 2.9568°W	B	Cambus O' May		Suspension footbridge
Dinnet Bridge	1935	57.0717°N 2.8898°W	B	Dinnet		Dinnet bridge...
Aboyne Bridge	1937	57.07°N 2.7871°W	B	Aboyne		Bridge over the Dee at Aboyne
Bridge Of Potarch	1811-1813	57.0652°N 2.6487°W	A			Potarch Bridge
Banchory Bridge		57.0477°N 2.5005°W		Banchory	B974	Upstream_face_of_Bridge_of_Dee,_Banchory_-_geograph.org.uk_-_2851590
Durris Bridge		57.0527°N 2.4095°W		Crathes	A957	Durris Bridge
Park Bridge	1854	57.0742°N 2.3372°W	A	Drumoak		Park_Bridge,_Drumoak_-_geograph.org.uk_-_5239410
Milltimber Bridge		57.0943°N 2.2352°W		Peterculter		Milltimber Bridge
River Dee Crossing		57.0943°N 2.2331°W			A90	AWPR Dee Bridge
St Devenick Suspension Bridge	1836	57.1143°N 2.1705°W	B	Cults	Also called Morison's Bridge and informally "Shakkin' Briggie"	SkakkinBriggie-68509-PeterWard
Bridge Of Dee, Ruthrieston	1520	57.1229°N 2.1189°W	A	Aberdeen	A92	Bridge of Dee (Brig o' Dee), Aberdeen
King George VI Bridge	1941	57.1284°N 2.1079°W	B	Aberdeen		King George VI Bridge
Ferryhill Railway Viaduct, Aberdeen		57.1299°N 2.0958°W	C	Aberdeen		River Dee Railway Bridge
Wellington Suspension Bridge	1831	57.1356°N 2.0955°W	A	Aberdeen		Wellington Suspension Bridge
Queen Elizabeth Bridge		57.1363°N 2.0954°W		Aberdeen		The Queen Elizabeth Bridge, Aberdeen
Queen Victoria Bridge	1881	57.14°N 2.0895°W	B	Aberdeen		Victoria Bridge, Aberdeen
