= Craiglich =

Coordinates: 56.21845°N 4.36892°W

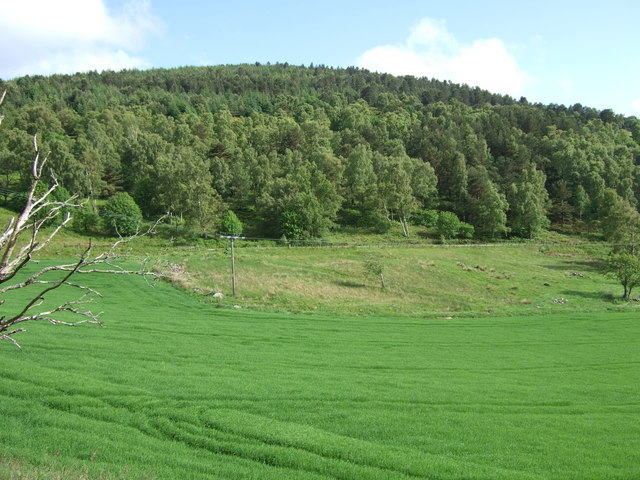
- Craiglich

Highest point
- Elevation: 476 m (1,562 ft)
- Prominence: 165 m (541 ft)
- Listing: Marilyn

Geography
- Location: Aberdeenshire, Scotland
- OS grid: NJ532054

Craiglich is a hill in western Aberdeenshire, with a height of 476 metres (1562 feet). Its ease of access, Marilyn status and scenic views make it popular with hill walkers.

The Queen's View, a local beauty spot at the western end of the hill, was Queen Victoria's favourite viewpoint en route to Balmoral. Situated directly opposite a small car park on the B9119 between Lumphanan and Tarland, it is one of the most accessible viewpoints in north east Scotland, commanding a spectacular panoramic view over the countryside towards Mount Keen, Lochnagar and the Cairngorms.
