= Charles Begg =

Piano manufacturer, piano tuner, music shop proprietor

Charles Begg (c. 1825 – 21 December 1874) was a New Zealand piano manufacturer, piano tuner and music shop proprietor. He was born in Aboyne, Aberdeenshire, Scotland, in about 1825. After his death, his sons Alexander (died 1941) and Charles continued the business.

In 2022, Begg and his wife, Jessie, were jointly inducted into the New Zealand Business Hall of Fame.
