= List of listed buildings in Aboyne and Glen Tanar =

This is a list of listed buildings in the parish of Aboyne and Glen Tanar in Aberdeenshire, Scotland.

== List ==
Name	Location	Date listed	Grid ref. (Note: Sometimes known as OSGB36, the grid reference (where provided) is based on the British national grid reference system used by the Ordnance Survey. • "Guide to National Grid". Ordnance Survey. • "Get-a-map". Ordnance Survey.)	Geo-coordinates	Notes	LB number (Note: Historic Environment Scotland assign a unique alphanumeric identifier to each designated site in Scotland, for listed buildings this always begins with "LB", for example "LB12345".)	Image
Aboyne, Huntly Road, Aboyne And Dinnet Parish Church, St Machar's, (Church Of Scotland), Including Church Hall, Burial Ground, Gates, Gatepiers And Boundary Walls				57°04′24″N 2°47′08″W	Category B	3116	Upload Photo
1-3 (Inclusive Numbers) Kirkton Cottages, Formerly Craigwell Poorhouses				57°05′24″N 2°44′52″W	Category C(S)	3123	Upload Photo
Aboyne, Ballater Road, St Margaret's Rc Church, Including Adjoining Presbytery, Ancillary Structure, Gates Gatepiers And Boundary Walls				57°04′31″N 2°47′05″W	Category C(S)	47052	Upload another image See more images
Aboyne, Ballater Road, St Thomas's Episcopal Church, Including Boiler House, Lych Gate, Gatepiers And Boundary Walls				57°04′33″N 2°47′32″W	Category A	47053	Upload another image See more images
Aboyne, The Glebe House, Walled Garden				57°04′14″N 2°47′26″W	Category C(S)	47065	Upload Photo
Aboyne, Golf Road, East Mains				57°04′47″N 2°46′24″W	Category C(S)	47066	Upload Photo
Aboyne Castle Policies, South Lodge, Including Gates, Gatepiers And Boundary Walls				57°04′38″N 2°46′43″W	Category B	47076	Upload Photo
Fasnadarach, Including Ancillary Structures, Gatepiers And Boundary Walls				57°04′23″N 2°52′52″W	Category B	47080	Upload Photo
Glen Tanar Estate, Greystone, Including Boundary Walls				57°03′42″N 2°50′27″W	Category C(S)	47088	Upload Photo
Lower Dess Sawmill				57°05′14″N 2°42′38″W	Category C(S)	47094	Upload Photo
Glen Tanar Estate, Bridge Of Tanar, Over The Water Of Tanar				57°03′25″N 2°51′31″W	Category B	3128	Upload Photo
Aboyne Castle Policies, Ice House				57°04′56″N 2°46′41″W	Category C(S)	47075	Upload Photo
Aboyne Castle Policies, West Lodge, Including Gates, Gatepiers And Boundary Walls				57°04′53″N 2°47′34″W	Category B	47077	Upload Photo
Glen Tanar Estate, Former School And Schoolhouse, Including Ancillary Structure, Play Shed, Gates, Gatepiers And Boundary Walls				57°04′19″N 2°52′20″W	Category B	47086	Upload Photo
Glen Tanar Estate, Game Larder				57°02′55″N 2°52′03″W	Category C(S)	47087	Upload Photo
Glen Tanar Estate, Tower Of Ess, Including Gatepiers And Boundary Walls				57°03′48″N 2°49′08″W	Category B	47093	Upload Photo
Aboyne, Charleston Road, The Old Free Kirk				57°04′26″N 2°46′49″W	Category B	44449	Upload another image See more images
Balnacraig House, Including Gatepiers And Boundary Walls				57°04′25″N 2°41′38″W	Category B	3124	Upload Photo
Glen Tanar Estate, Old Glen Tanar Church, Burial Ground And Boundary Walls				57°04′23″N 2°51′56″W	Category C(S)	3129	Upload Photo
Aboyne, Bridgeview Road, Aboyne Bridge, Over River Dee				57°04′12″N 2°47′14″W	Category B	47060	Upload another image See more images
Aboyne, Station Square, Charleston Cottages, Including Boundary Wall				57°04′36″N 2°46′38″W	Category C(S)	47072	Upload Photo
Glen Tanar Estate, Home Farm, Including Farmhouse, Cattle Court And Granary, Implement Shed, Ancillary Structures And Boundary Walls				57°03′06″N 2°52′05″W	Category B	47089	Upload Photo
Aboyne, Huntly Arms Hotel, Gazebo				57°04′30″N 2°46′46″W	Category B	44960	Upload Photo
Aboyne, Bridgeview Road, Bridgend Cottage, Including Gates, Gatepiers And Boundary Wall				57°04′13″N 2°47′16″W	Category B	3118	Upload Photo
Aboyne, Bridge Over Tarland Burn				57°04′40″N 2°46′32″W	Category C(S)	3120	Upload Photo
Aboyne Castle Policies, Mains Of Aboyne, Including Ancillary Structure, Gatepiers And Boundary Walls				57°04′58″N 2°47′04″W	Category B	3121	Upload Photo
Aboyne Castle Policies, Allach Bridge				57°04′54″N 2°46′51″W	Category B	47074	Upload Photo
Ferrar Steading, Including Ancillary Structure And Enclosure				57°04′42″N 2°51′08″W	Category B	47082	Upload Photo
Glen Tanar Estate, Boathouse On The Fish Pond				57°02′42″N 2°51′51″W	Category C(S)	47083	Upload Photo
Glen Tanar Estate, 1-5 Bush Cottages (Inclusive Numbers) And Kennels, Including Boundary Walls And Railings				57°02′54″N 2°52′13″W	Category C(S)	47084	Upload Photo
Glen Tanar Estate, East Millfield Farmhouse And Steading, Including Boundary Walls				57°03′31″N 2°51′03″W	Category C(S)	47085	Upload Photo
Aboyne, Huntly Arms Hotel				57°04′32″N 2°46′46″W	Category C(S)	44959	Upload Photo
Aboyne, Ballater Road, War Memorial Buildings, Including Boundary Wall				57°04′35″N 2°46′51″W	Category C(S)	47055	Upload Photo
Aboyne, Bridgeview Road, Ivy Cottage And Ivy Cottage North, Including Gates, Gatepiers And Boundary Wall				57°04′17″N 2°47′21″W	Category C(S)	47062	Upload Photo
Aboyne, Rhu-Na-Haven Road, Balnacoil House				57°04′25″N 2°48′17″W	Category C(S)	47067	Upload Photo
Aboyne, Rhu-Na-Haven Road, Lys-Na-Greyne, Including Gatepiers And Boundary Walls				57°04′20″N 2°48′16″W	Category C(S)	47068	Upload Photo
Aboyne, Rhu-Na-Haven Road, Rhu-Na-Haven Walled Garden, Potting Shed, And Former Staff Quarters				57°04′05″N 2°48′05″W	Category B	47070	Upload Photo
Aboyne Castle, Including Gateway, Courtyard And Boundary Walls To North, And Ancillary Structures				57°05′04″N 2°46′59″W	Category B	3122	Upload Photo
Aboyne Castle Policies, Home Farm, Including Ancillary Structure And Boundary Wall				57°05′00″N 2°47′10″W	Category B	3125	Upload Photo
Glen Tanar Estate, St Lesmo's Chapel, Including Boundary Wall				57°03′09″N 2°51′37″W	Category B	44	Upload Photo
Aboyne, Ballater Road, Bydand, Former Aboyne Castle South Lodge, Including Boundary Walls				57°04′37″N 2°46′45″W	Category C(S)	47049	Upload Photo
Aboyne, Ballater Road, Struan Hall, Including Gates, Gatepiers, Timber Railings And Boundary Walls				57°04′34″N 2°47′29″W	Category C(S)	47054	Upload Photo
Aboyne, Bridgeview Road, Dessmuir, Including Gatepiers, Boundary Wall And Ancillary Structure				57°04′14″N 2°47′15″W	Category C(S)	47061	Upload Photo
Aboyne Castle Policies, Walled Garden, Garden House And The Wee House				57°04′57″N 2°47′33″W	Category C(S)	47078	Upload Photo
Ferrar Farmhouse, Including Gatepiers				57°04′41″N 2°51′08″W	Category C(S)	47081	Upload Photo
Aboyne, The Glebe House (Formerly Aboyne Manse), Including Ancillary Structure, Gatepiers And Boundary Wall				57°04′13″N 2°47′30″W	Category B	3117	Upload Photo
Aboyne, Rhu-Na-Haven Road, Rhu-Na-Haven, And Garden Ornaments, Including Statuary, Urns, Paving, Walls And Rustic Timber Ancillary Structure				57°04′05″N 2°48′10″W	Category A	3126	Upload Photo
Glen Tanar Estate, Bridge Of Ess, Over The Water Of Tanar				57°03′48″N 2°49′06″W	Category B	3127	Upload Photo
Aboyne, Ballater Road, The Cottage, Including Boundary Walls And Ancillary Structure				57°04′33″N 2°47′13″W	Category C(S)	47050	Upload Photo
Aboyne, Ballater Road, Hazlehurst, Including Ancillary Structure, Gatepiers And Boundary Walls				57°04′32″N 2°47′07″W	Category C(S)	47051	Upload Photo
Aboyne, Rhu-Na-Haven Road, Rhu-Na-Haven Lodge, Gates, Gatepiers And Boundary Walls				57°04′07″N 2°48′04″W	Category B	47069	Upload Photo
Aboyne, Station Square, Former Station Buildings				57°04′34″N 2°46′38″W	Category C(S)	47073	Upload Photo
Glen Tanar Estate, Little Tulloch, Including Ancillary Structure, Gates And Boundary Walls				57°03′31″N 2°55′00″W	Category C(S)	47090	Upload Photo
Glen Tanar Estate, Netherton, Kennel, Including Boundary Walls				57°04′05″N 2°53′49″W	Category C(S)	47091	Upload Photo
Glen Tanar Estate, Porphary Bridge Over Water Of Tanar				57°02′06″N 2°53′23″W	Category C(S)	47092	Upload Photo
Aboyne, Bridgeview Road, Ladywood Lodge, Including Ancillary Structure				57°04′19″N 2°47′25″W	Category C(S)	47063	Upload Photo
Aboyne, Charlestown Road, Birse Lodge Hotel, Former Huntly Lodge (Dower House) Including Gatepiers And Boundary Walls				57°04′21″N 2°47′06″W	Category C(S)	47064	Upload Photo
Aboyne, St Eunans Road, St Lesmo Tower, Including Gatepiers And Boundary Walls				57°04′29″N 2°47′29″W	Category C(S)	47071	Upload Photo
Balnacraig House, Steading				57°04′23″N 2°41′34″W	Category C(S)	47079	Upload Photo

== Key ==
The scheme for classifying buildings in Scotland is:

- Category A: "buildings of national or international importance, either architectural or historic; or fine, little-altered examples of some particular period, style or building type."
- Category B: "buildings of regional or more than local importance; or major examples of some particular period, style or building type, which may have been altered."
- Category C: "buildings of local importance; lesser examples of any period, style, or building type, as originally constructed or moderately altered; and simple traditional buildings which group well with other listed buildings."

In March 2016 there were 47,288 listed buildings in Scotland. Of these, 8% were Category A, and 50% were Category B, with the remaining 42% being Category C.

== See also ==
- List of listed buildings in Aberdeenshire
