= Belwade Farm =

Coordinates: 57°4′31.22″N 2°43′50.57″W

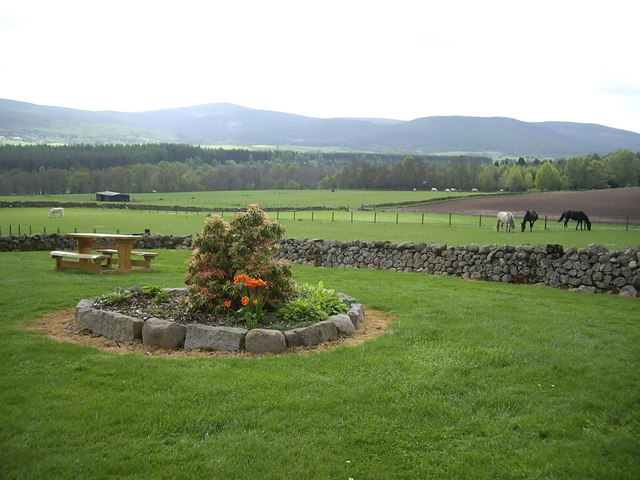

Belwade Farm is a horse stables near Aboyne, Scotland owned by World Horse Welfare.

== History ==
A new visitor centre and indoor arena was opened by Princess Anne, the president of World Horse Welfare, in October 2012.

In 2018, the site was caring for 30 horses. In May 2020, the site was at capacity, with 92 horses in its care. The site was closed to the public due to the COVID-19 pandemic. It reopened in August 2021.

== Work ==
The site contains a rescue and rehoming centre, which cares for horses, donkeys, and ponies. It is the only World Horse Welfare facility in Scotland.
