= Glen Tanar =

Glen of the Water of Tanar and national nature reserve in northeast Scotland

- IUCN category IV (habitat/species management area)
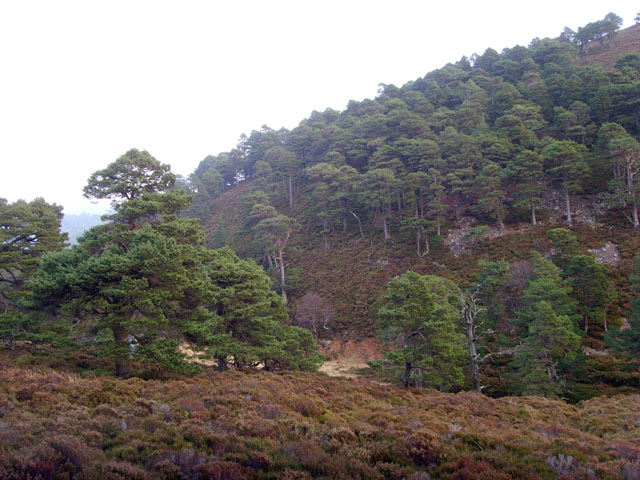
- Scots pines in Glen Tanar

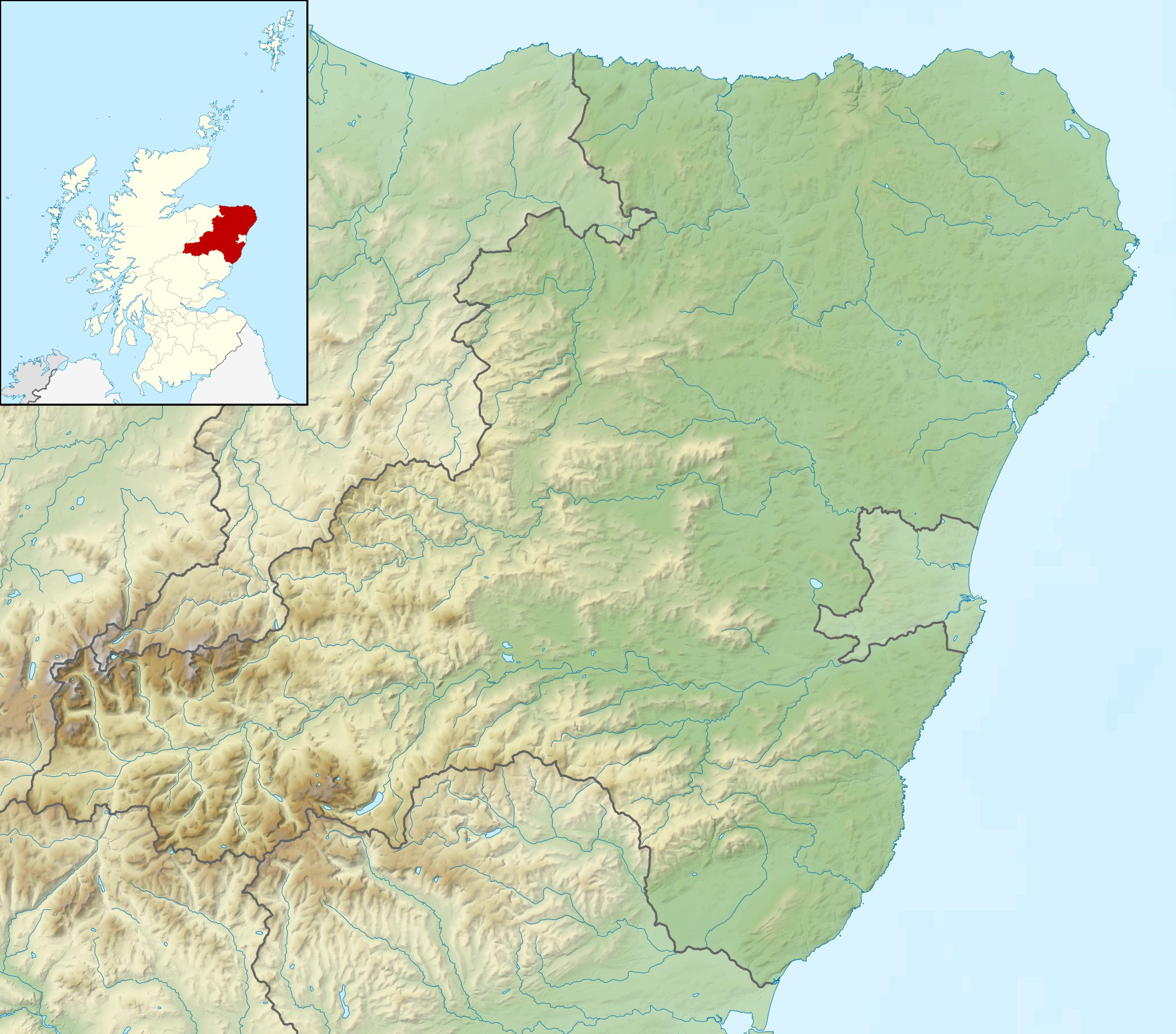
- Location within Aberdeenshire
- Location: Glen Tanar, Aberdeenshire, Scotland
- Coordinates: 57.050093°N 2.866778°W
- Area: 41.9 km^{2} (16.2 sq mi)
- Designation: NatureScot
- Established: 1979
- Owner: Glen Tanar Estate
- Website: Official website

Inventory of Gardens and Designed Landscapes in Scotland
- Official name: Glen Tanar
- Designated: 1 July 1987
- Reference no.: GDL00191

Glen Tanar (Scottish Gaelic: Gleann Tanar) is a glen in Aberdeenshire, eastern Scotland, through which the Water of Tanar flows. Near the mouth of the glen, at Tower o' Ess, the Water of Tanar flows into the River Dee. This flows through Deeside into the North Sea at Aberdeen. Glen Tanar contains the third largest area of Caledonian Forest in Scotland, and is of national and European importance. It lies 29 km east from the British royal family's private residence of Balmoral Castle.

42 km^{2} of the glen is designated by NatureScot as a national nature reserve (NNR). Most of the area remains under private ownership as part of the Glen Tanar Estate. However 182 ha is owned by NatureScot, being designated as the "Strict Reserve Zone" of the NNR. Glen Tanar lies within the Cairngorms National Park, and is also designated as a Site of Special Scientific Interest (SSSI), a Special Protection Area (SPA), and a Special Area of Conservation. The NNR is designated a Category IV protected area by the International Union for Conservation of Nature.

Glen Tanar provides the northern walking route to Mount Keen, Scotland's most easterly Munro. Starting at the car park at the end of the public road, walkers follow the glen through the native Caledonian Forest into open moorland before crossing the river to begin the ascent.

== Flora and fauna ==
Glen Tanar, along with the side glens formed by the Water of Gairney and the Water of Allachy, comprises the third largest area of Caledonian Forest in Scotland, which grows from the valley floor up to an altitude of 450 metres. As a Caledonian Forest, the predominant tree species is Scots pine, although broad-leaved tree species including birch, alder, rowan, holly, aspen and oak are also present. Juniper grows at the boundary between the forest and the open moorland above, and areas of blaeberry, heather and feather mosses can also be found. The woodland floor provides a habitat for many of the species typically found in the Caledonian Forest, including twinflower, creeping lady's-tresses, toothed wintergreen and intermediate wintergreen.

Invertebrate species at Glen Tanar are representative of the Caledonian Forest. Of particular note are the rare false blister beetle, the hoverfly Callicera rufa, the bumblebee robberfly and the green hairstreak butterfly.

Glen Tanar is an important site for birds, reflected in its SPA designation, which notes the breeding presence of four particular species: capercaillie, Scottish crossbill, osprey and golden eagle. The capercaillie population here is of national importance. In early 2019 visitors were asked to stay away from certain parts of the estate in order to avoid disturbing a particularly aggressive lekking capercaillie. Glen Tanar is also noted for black grouse, hen harrier, golden plover and merlin, and is probably the most important site for the Scottish crossbill, a species endemic to Scotland.

Mammal species at Glen Tanar include red squirrel, Scottish wildcat and otter. The river system is also important for Atlantic salmon.

== History ==
Glen Tanar was historically part of the lands of the Marquis of Huntly. In 1865 the estate was bought by William Cunliffe Brooks, an English barrister and merchant banker who in 1869 was elected as Conservative MP for East Cheshire. Brooks had a major influence on the estate, building a large house, cottages for estate workers, a school, stables, and kennels, as well as constructing several bridges and landscaping the gardens. He also installed numerous carved stones and memorials in the surrounding countryside, many of which make playful references to his name or celebrate the virtues of drinking water rather than alcohol. In 1905 the estate was bought by George Coats, owner of the Paisley based thread manufacturer J & P Coats Ltd. In 1916 Coats was raised to the peerage as Baron Glentanar, and the estate remains in the ownership of his descendants.

Timber has been extracted from the woodlands at Glen Tanar for at least 250 years, with the earliest record of a sawmill dating from 1732. The rate of felling increased during the Victorian period, and this, combined with an increase in deer and livestock numbers on the estate, hampered the natural regeneration of the forest. The forest avoided the heavy felling that affected other woods on Deeside during the Great War, and in 1937 deer fencing was erected to allow natural regeneration of the forest. During the 1950s and 60s some areas were planted with non-native conifers, but these are now being gradually removed. Seasonal grazing of cattle ceased in the 1990s, and a section of the deer fence was removed in 1996. The forest is now allowed to regenerate naturally, with deer numbers being controlled by culling. The reduction in pressure on the forestry has also allowed trees to spread onto areas of the adjoining moorland.

== See also ==
- List of listed buildings in Aboyne and Glen Tanar
