= River Dee =

River Dee may refer to:

- River Dee, Aberdeenshire, Scotland, flowing from the Cairngorms to Aberdeen
- River Dee, Wales, flowing through North Wales and through Cheshire in England
- River Dee, Cumbria, flowing from the border between Cumbria and North Yorkshire
- River Dee, Galloway, in Dumfries and Galloway, Scotland
- River Dee (Ireland)
- Dee River (Queensland), Australia, a tributary of the Dawson
- Dee River (Tasmania), Australia, a tributary of the River Derwent

== See also ==
- D River, Lincoln City, Oregon, United States
