= Aboyne Hospital =

- NHS Grampian
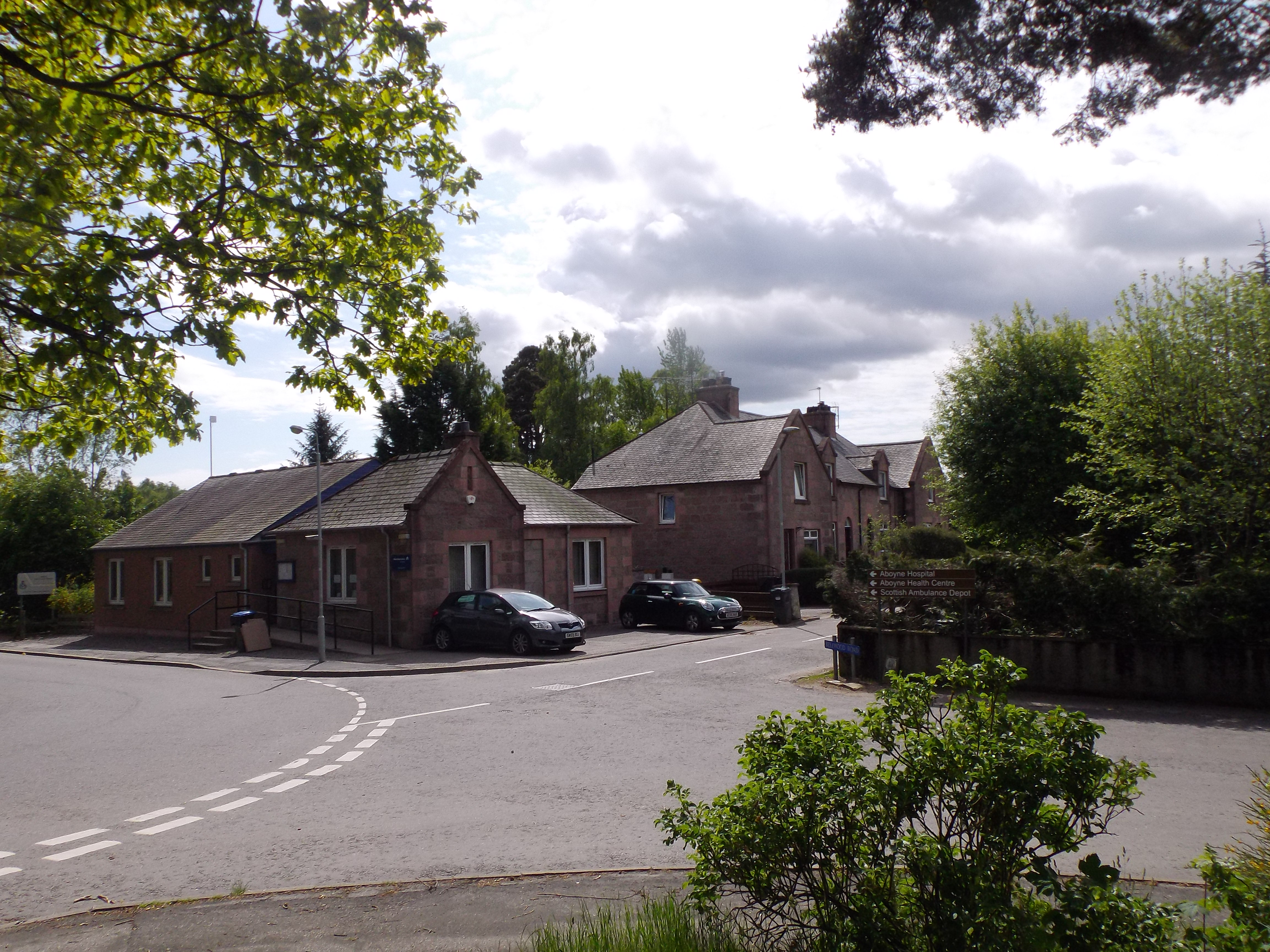
- Access to Aboyne Hospital

- Location within Aberdeenshire

Geography
- Location: Bellwood Road, Aboyne, Scotland
- Coordinates: 57.0762°N 2.7670°W

Organisation
- Care system: NHS Scotland
- Type: General

Services
- Emergency department: No

History
- Founded: 1898

Links
- Lists: Hospitals in Scotland

Aboyne Hospital is a community hospital in Bellwood Road, Aboyne, Scotland. It is managed by NHS Grampian.

== History ==
The facility, which was designed by Jenkins & Marr, opened as an infectious diseases hospital in 1898. A ward pavilion was added in 1926 and, after the hospital had joined the National Health Service in 1948, a new health centre was added in 1980. A major refurbishment started in 2002 and the newly modernised facilities were opened by Anne, Princess Royal in August 2003.
