= Linn (geology) =

Scottish geological water feature

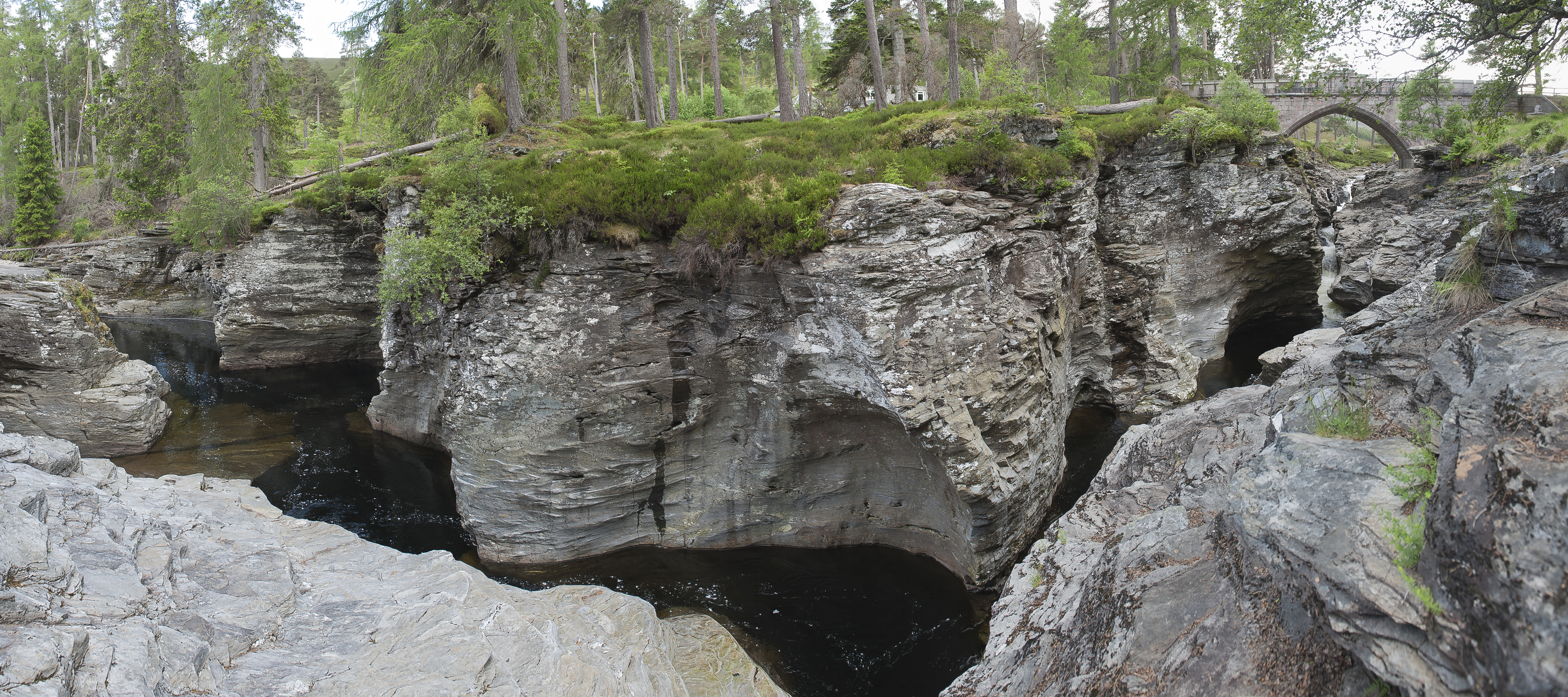
Linn of Dee

In Scotland and northern England (Northumberland, Cumbria and Durham), a Linn is a geographical water feature, a watercourse that has cut through a shelf of hard rock creating a narrow (usually), steep-sided crevice (fracture) through which it runs, typically in the form of a waterfall.

Typically one named after a river or area can have application even for more than one such feature.

The photograph of the Linn of Dee illustrates the attributes of a typical 'Linn'.

In Gordon (1925) the author describing a walk down Glen Avon in the Cairngorms mentions two Linns on the River Avon - first:

A couple of miles below Faindouran Lodge the A'an is spanned by a bridge. Here the river is narrow, with foaming rapids and deep pools where salmon lie of a September day. Beside the Linn, on the damp granite ledges ...

— Gordon (1925) (p61)

Second:

At the Linn beside Inchrory the A'an thundered through its rocky gorge. Before midsummer salmon and grilse reach the deep pools of the Linn ...

— Gordon (1925) (p62-63)

A linn may also refer to a waterfall or a pool at the foot of a waterfall, with the derivation a confusion of Scots Gaelic linne (pool) and Old English hlynn (torrent).

== Sources ==
- Gordon, Seton (1925). The Cairngorm Hills Of Scotland. London, England.: Cassell and Company.
