= Alexander Gordon (brewer) =

Scottish brewer and philanthropist (1818–1895)

Alexander Gordon (1818–1895) was a Scottish brewer and philanthropist. He was born in Glen Girnock, Aberdeenshire and studied an apprenticeship in Dundee. Shortly after turning 18 Gordon was placed in charge of a brewery in Aberdeen and later worked at the Lochnagar distillery. He moved to London and founded the Messrs. Gordons Brewery in Islington in 1852. Gordon opened a second brewery in Peckham and grew wealthy before his retirement in 1891. Gordon donated money to improve Ballater, a village near his birthplace. His donations enabled the erection of a church, two halls and the Polhollick bridge. Gordon had no children and his estate paid to construct the Cambus O' May bridge after his death.

== Early life ==
Gordon was born in 1818 at Littlemill, Glen Girnock, Aberdeenshire. He was the second son of a tenant farmer married to Betty Gauld of Migvie. He also had two sisters and at least two brothers. Alexander Gordon and his brother, John, were sent to stay with their uncle William Gauld who was a farmer, teacher and preacher. The brothers received a good education, perhaps at Logie Coldstone, and Alexander was apprenticed to a Mr Rattray in Dundee, where the family had another uncle.

== Brewing ==
Alexander Gordon was given charge of a brewery in Aberdeen shortly after turning 18 and by 1838 he was working at the Lochnagar distillery. He afterwards went to a brewery in London, while his brothers went abroad to Ceylon. In London he founded the Messrs. Gordons Brewery in Caledonian Road, Islington, in 1852; he opened a second brewery as a branch of the firm in 1876 at Lyndhurst Road in Peckham. Gordon became wealthy from the brewery and also developed an interest in engineering. He retired from the company on 30 September 1891. By that time, his partners were his nephews George William Gordon and Alexander Duncan Gordon, sons of his brother John. The firm continued in business, under the name A. Gordon and Co., until the early part of the First World War during which consumption of alcohol was restricted by the Defence of the Realm Act 1914.

== Personal life ==
Gordon married Elizabeth Mickle in 1844 and they did not have any children. They lived in a country mansion, 'Southwood' (no longer existing), in Hildenborough in Kent. In 1895 Gordon died, followed by his wife a few months later. He was buried in Highgate Cemetery in London.

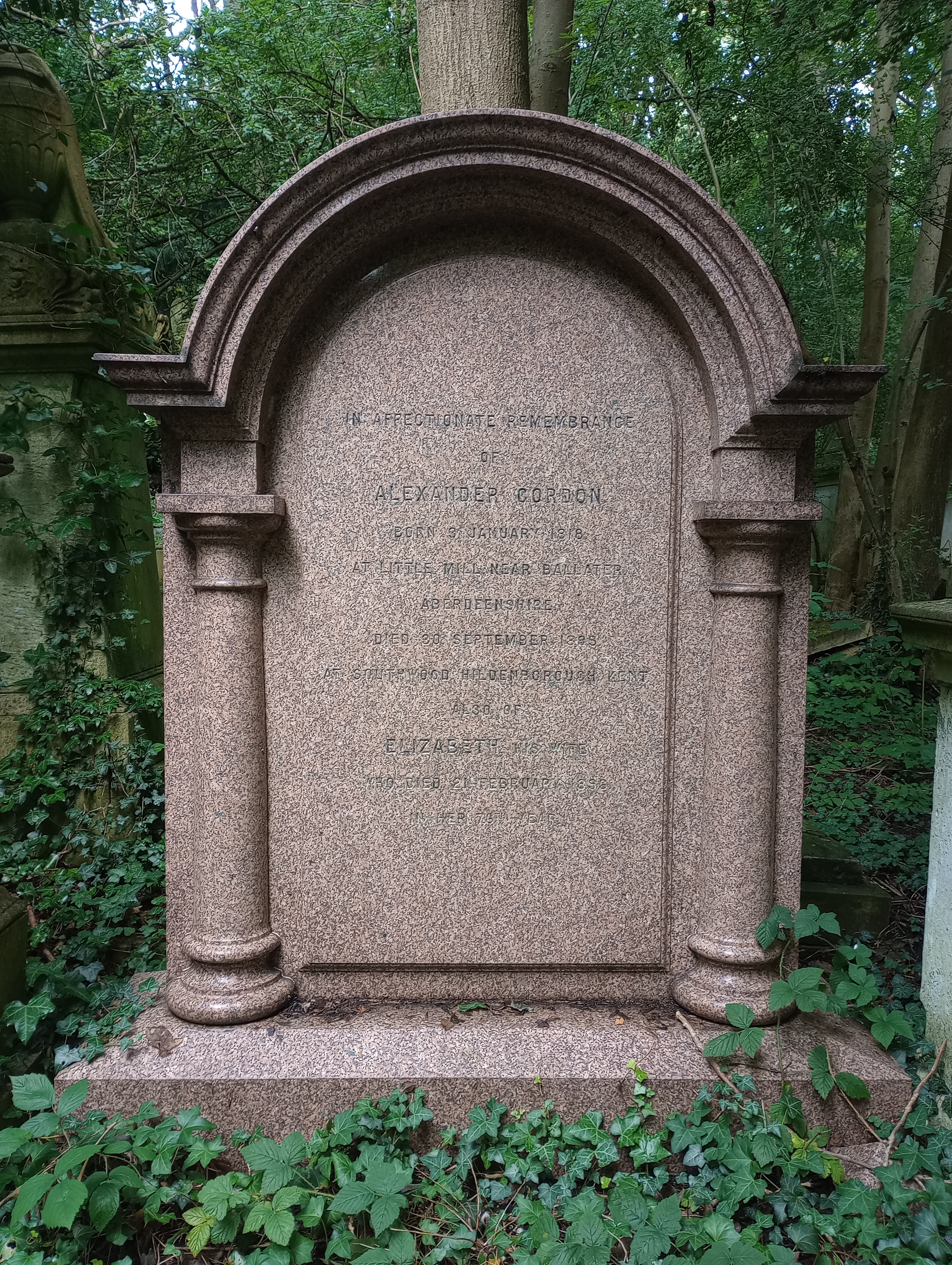
The grave of Alexander Gordon in Highgate Cemetery

== Philanthropy ==
Gordon donated money to erect many buildings in Ballater. These included a church, the Albert Hall (1874) and Victoria Hall (1895). The halls were intended to provide venues for public entertainment and education. Gordon also paid to erect the Polhollick bridge near the village in 1892, to replace an earlier ferry, after witnessing a drowning at the site. Ten years after Gordon's death his estate gave money to erect another footbridge near Ballater, the Cambus O' May bridge.
