= Water of Tanar =

River in Aberdeenshire, Scotland

Coordinates: 57°03′59″N 2°48′13″W

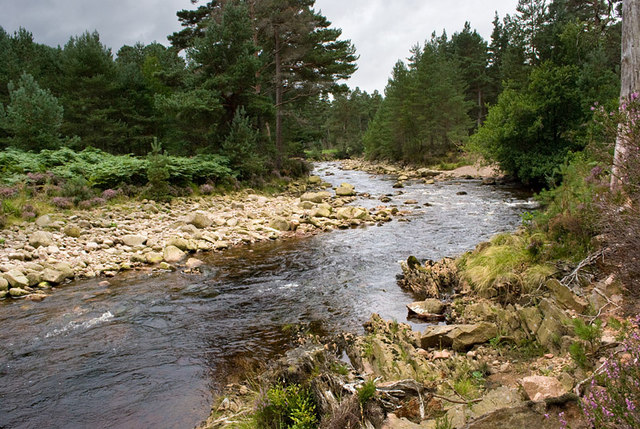
Water of Tanar

Water of Tanar is a river of the Grampian Mountains of Aberdeenshire, Scotland. It flows through Glen Tanar to join the River Dee at the mouth of the glen near the Tower of Ess.

It is crossed in the Glen Tanar Estate by a number of listed bridges, including a Category B listed military bridge and the Bridge of Ess and the Category C listed Porphary bridge.
