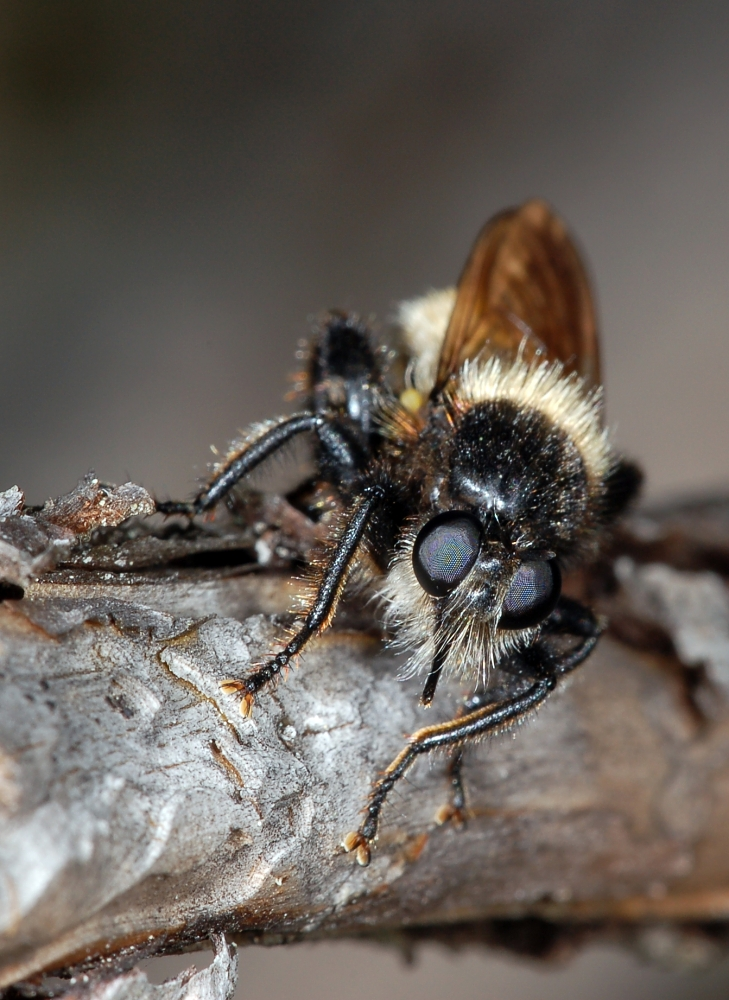
- Front view of a male

Scientific classification
- Kingdom: Animalia
- Phylum: Arthropoda
- Clade: Pancrustacea
- Class: Insecta
- Order: Diptera
- Family: Asilidae
- Genus: Laphria
- Species: L. flava

Binomial name
- Laphria flava (Linnaeus, 1761)

= Laphria flava =

Species of insect

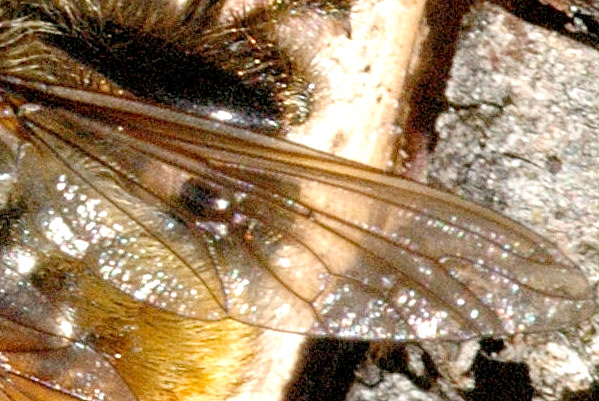
Detail of a wing

Laphria flava, the bumblebee robberfly, yellow robberfly or yellow assassin fly, is a fly of the Asilidae family.

== Features ==
The size of the yellow predators is variable, reaching a body length of 12 to 25 millimeters and are strongly built. They have dense hairs, which are coloured yellow and black making it resemble a bumblebee. The anterior part of the chest is covered with short, yellow hair; the posterior part of the chest has a dense, long hairs of the same colour, which are directed backwards. The back and legs are also hairy. reddish hairs over orange on abdominal tergites 3–7 It is ifficult to distinguish from other Laphria. Wolff, Gebel and Geller-Grimm (2021), ( Majer (1997), van den Broek (1979), Stubbs and Drake (2001) all provide keys, descriptions and illustrations. Older works are also useful eg. Seguy (1920)

== Literature ==
- Heiko Bellmann: Insekten. 2nd edition, Steinbachs Naturführer, Eugen Ulmer Verlag, 2010, S. 145, ISBN 978-3-8001-5931-4
- Heiko Bellmann: Der neue Kosmos Insektenführer. Franckh-Kosmos, Stuttgart 2009, S. 228, ISBN 978-3-440-11924-2
