= Cambus O' May bridge =

Bridge in Aberdeenshire, Scotland

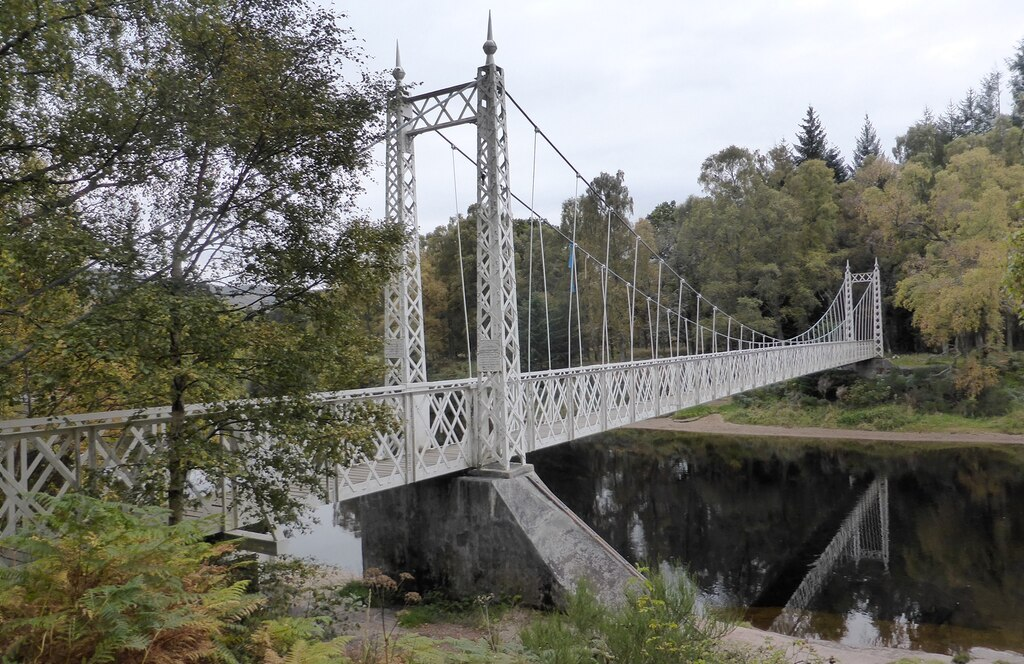
- Coordinates: 57.06587°N 2.95679°W
- OS grid reference: NO 42078 97610
- Carries: Pedestrians
- Crosses: River Dee
- Locale: Aberdeenshire
- Owner: Aberdeenshire Council

Characteristics
- Design: Suspension
- Total length: 164 feet (50 m)
- Width: 4 feet (1.2 m)
- No. of spans: 1

History
- Opened: 1905
- Rebuilt: 1988, 2020-2021
- Replaces: Ferry crossing

Listed Building – Category B
- Official name: Cambus O'May, Suspension Bridge Over River Dee
- Designated: 15 April 1971
- Reference no.: LB9328

Location
- Interactive map of Cambus O' May bridge

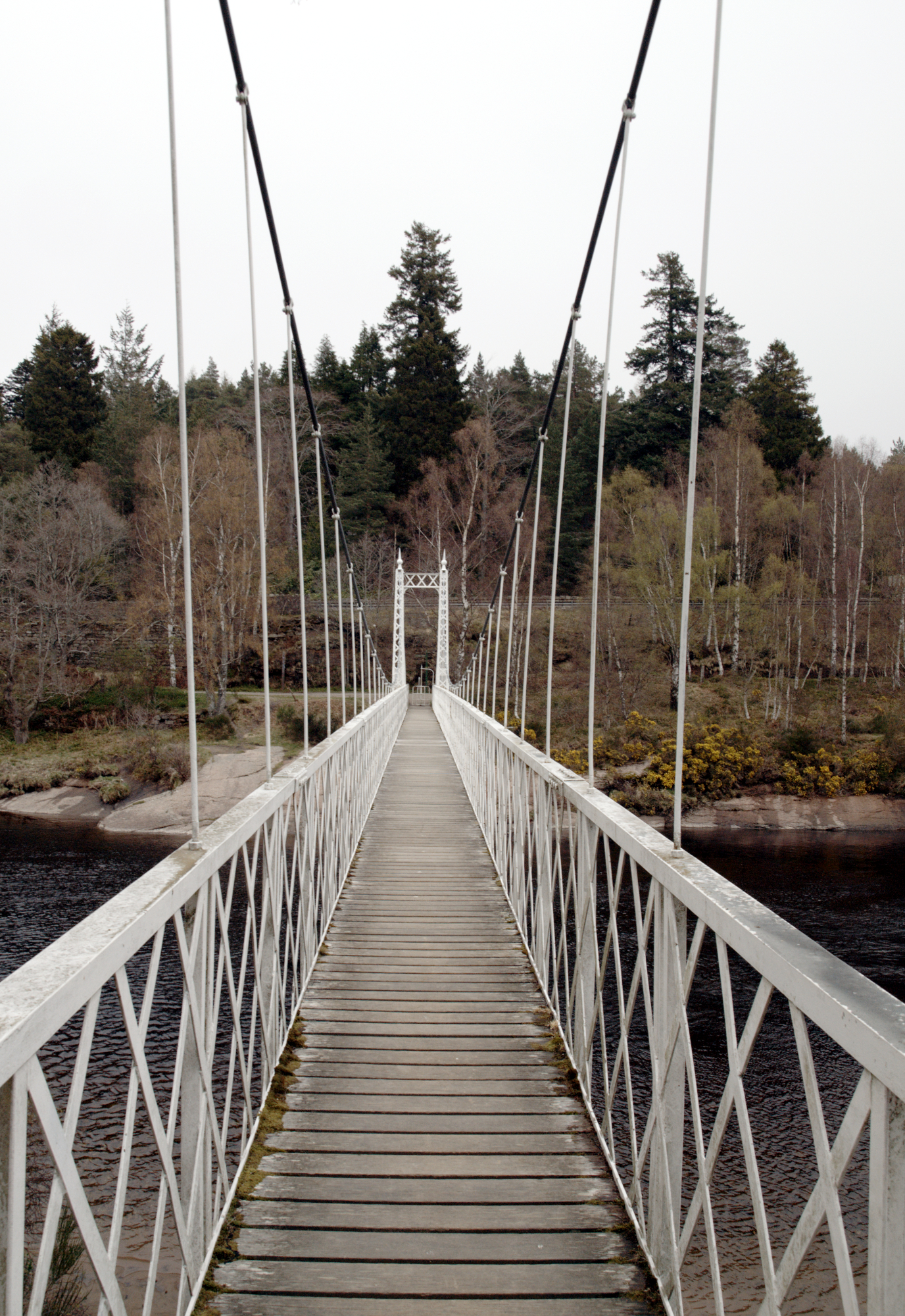
A view along the deck

The Cambus O' May bridge spans the River Dee to the east of Ballater, Aberdeenshire, Scotland. It was paid for by the estate of Alexander Gordon, who had grown up nearby. The bridge was built in 1905 and is a suspension footbridge 164 feet (50 m) long and 4 feet (1.2 m) wide. The bridge was rebuilt in 1988 for safety reasons but was badly damaged in the December 2015 Storm Frank. It was repaired and reopened in April 2021.

== Construction ==
Cambus O' May lies to the east of Ballater, Aberdeenshire and is located on a large bend of the River Dee. Its name derives from the Gaelic Cama a' Mhaigh ("bend of the plain"). Originally a farm it grew to several households and for a while had a railway station. There was originally a ferry crossing of the river at this location. Gordon later moved to England where he prospered in business and made various donations to the Glen Girnock district, including for the construction of the Polhollick Bridge and buildings in Ballater. Some ten years after Gordon's death his estate gave money for the construction of a bridge at Cambus O' May.

The bridge was built in 1905. David McFetrich in An Encyclopaedia of British Bridges (2019) states it was designed and built by Louis Harper but J.R. Hume in Scottish suspension bridges (1977) states it was by the ironfounder James Abernethy. Abernethy was a cousin of the civil engineer James Abernethy and his foundry at Aberdeen, James Abernethy & Co, cast the bridge components.

It is a suspension bridge with a deck 4 feet (1.2 m) wide and a clear span of 164 feet (50 m). A 46-inch (120 cm) high lattice truss runs either side of the deck, acting to stiffen the bridge and serve as a parapet. The two steel suspension cables are carried by two tapered lattice towers, which are topped with ball-shaped finials.

The Deeside Way, a trail following the former Deeside Railway, passes the north-eastern end of the bridge. The bridge itself forms part of the Cairngorms National Park Core Path Network. Footpaths from the bridge lead to Torphantrick Wood and the Muir of Dinnet nature reserve. The bridge is a popular tourist site and a hotel and restaurant is located at the site.

In 1982 the Kincardine and Deeside District Council carried out a minor renovation that cost £38,482. The bridge was almost completely rebuilt in 1988 for safety reasons, though the original design was retained. The bridge was formally reopened by Queen Elizabeth The Queen Mother

== 2015 damage and subsequent repairs ==
Cambus O' May bridge was severely damaged during Storm Frank in December 2015. The river rose 12 feet (3.7 m) above its usual level and the bridge deck was submerged. The bridge suffered damage from the water and large objects such as trees that were carried in the flow.

Rebuilding work was part funded by Aberdeenshire Council and the Scottish Government. Further funding was provided by donations from the Ballater Royal Deeside group and a personal pledge from Prince Charles. The total cost was around £400,000.

The rebuilding work started in September 2020. At the end of that month the area was hit by Storm Alex which again caused the Dee to rise and almost submerged the bridge. Although the bridge was then only partly repaired it survived without further damage, though some temporary scaffolding was buckled. Repair work was affected by the third COVID-19 lockdown in January 2021, as works were nearing completion. The bridge eventually re-opened in April 2021, the last bridge in Aberdeenshire damaged by Storm Frank to re-open. There was criticism from some parties for the council's decision to retain the turnstiles at each end of the bridge. There were complaints that these made access difficult or impossible for the disabled or people with prams. The council stated that replacing the turnstiles was necessary because of "legal, safety and heritage obligations".

The bridge is Category B listed.

== See also ==
- List of bridges in Scotland
