= Victoria Bridge, Mar Lodge Estate =

Bridge in Aberdeenshire, Scotland

Victoria Bridge
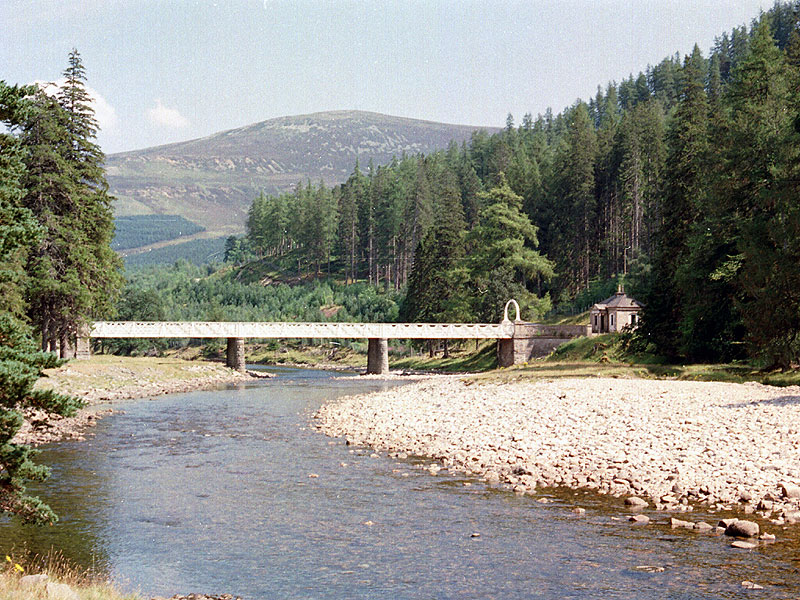
- Victoria Bridge in 1995
- Coordinates: 56.98850°N 3.47906°W
- OS grid reference: NO 10223 89564
- Crosses: River Dee
- Locale: Aberdeenshire
- Preceded by: Linn of Dee Bridge
- Followed by: Invercauld Bridge

Characteristics
- No. of spans: 3

History
- Built: 1905; 121 years ago
- Replaces: Wooden bridge

Listed Building – Category B
- Official name: Mar Lodge Victoria Bridge
- Designated: 18 March 1985
- Reference no.: LB3002

Location
- Interactive map of Victoria Bridge

Victoria Bridge is the early 20th century lattice girder bridge over the River Dee at Mar Lodge on Mar Lodge Estate, Aberdeenshire, Scotland. This bridge, built in 1905 and replaced an earlier wooden bridge, built in 1848 by the Duke of Leeds during his tenancy of the estate. The archway at the south end of the bridge bears '1848 Queen Victoria 1848' on the south side and '1905 Edward VII 1905' commemorating the construction of both bridges and the reigning monarch at the time.

== Description ==
Built in 1905, Victoria Bridge is classed as a Category B structure.

Victoria Bridge crosses the River Dee linking the drive to Mar Lodge with the public road between Braemar and Linn of Dee.

At the public road end there is a gate and a gate house that was occupied by a Gatekeeper when Mar Lodge Estate was owned by the Duffs.

== Gallery ==
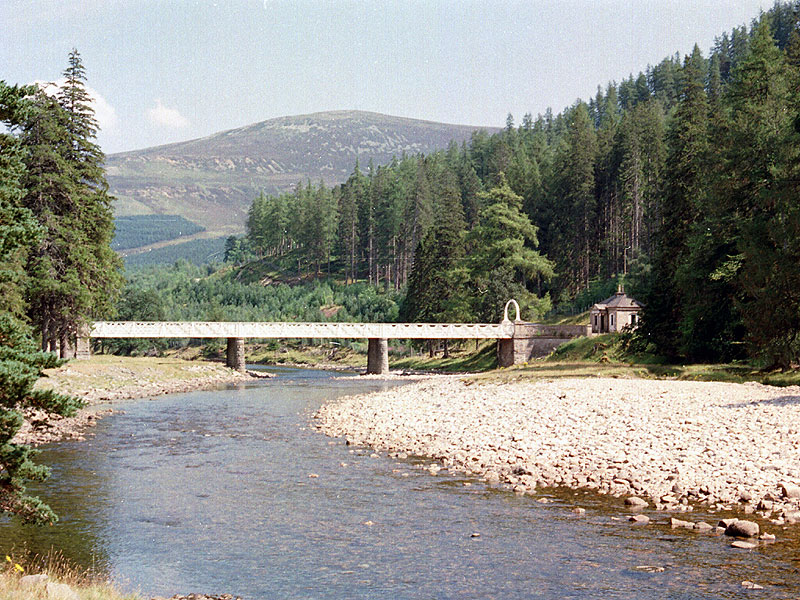
Victoria Bridge

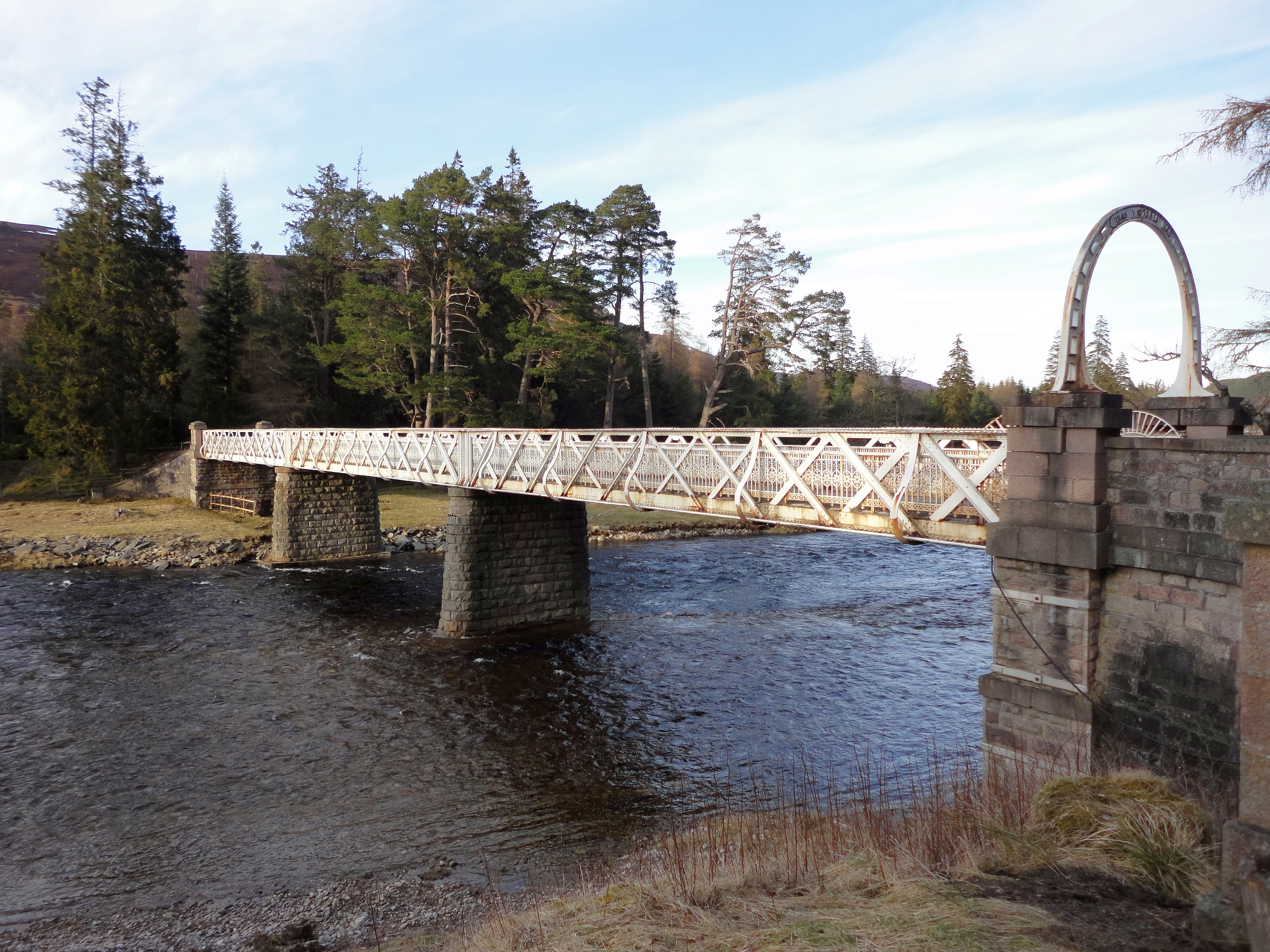
Victoria Bridge

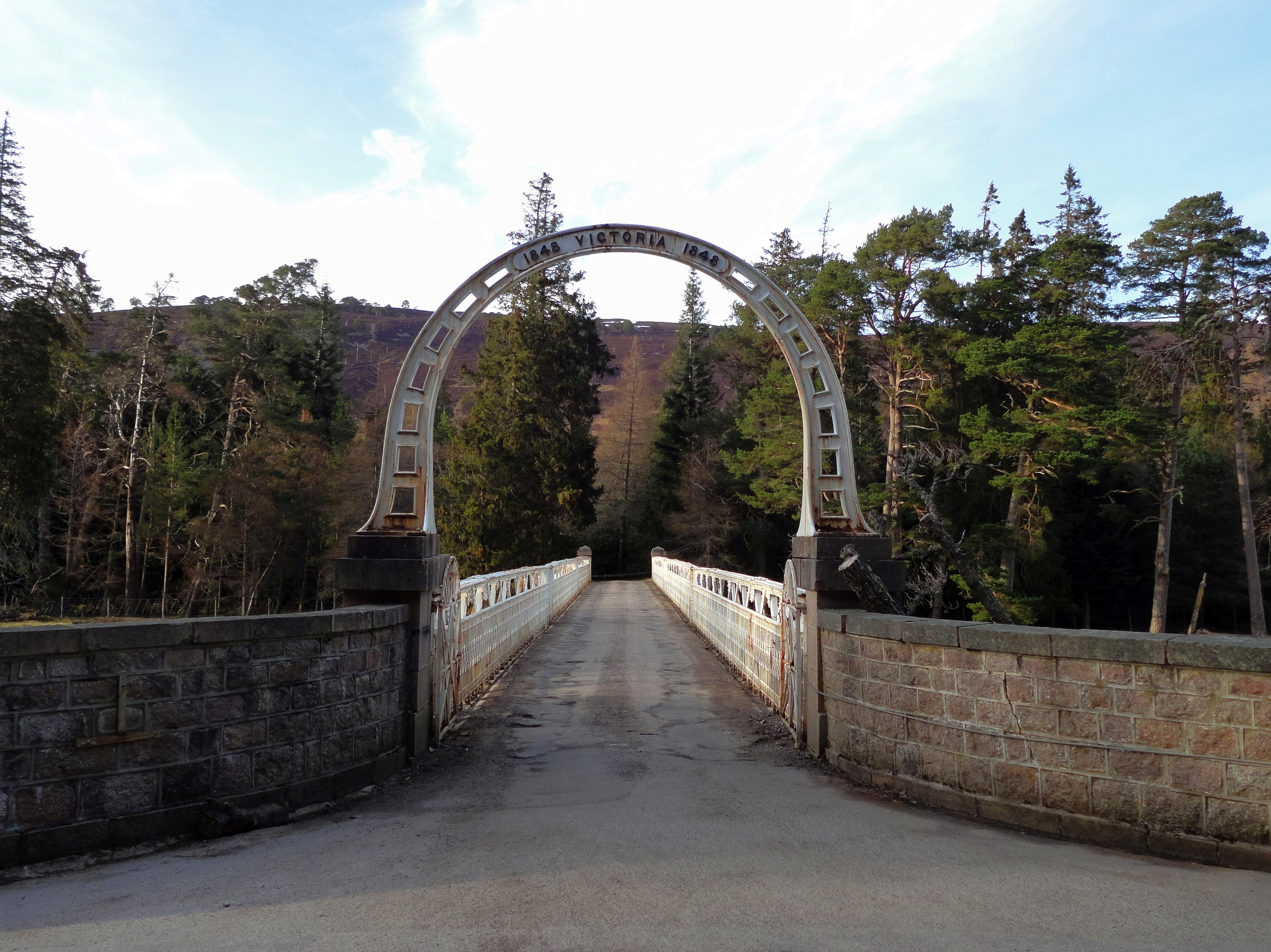
Victoria Bridge, view from the Gate House

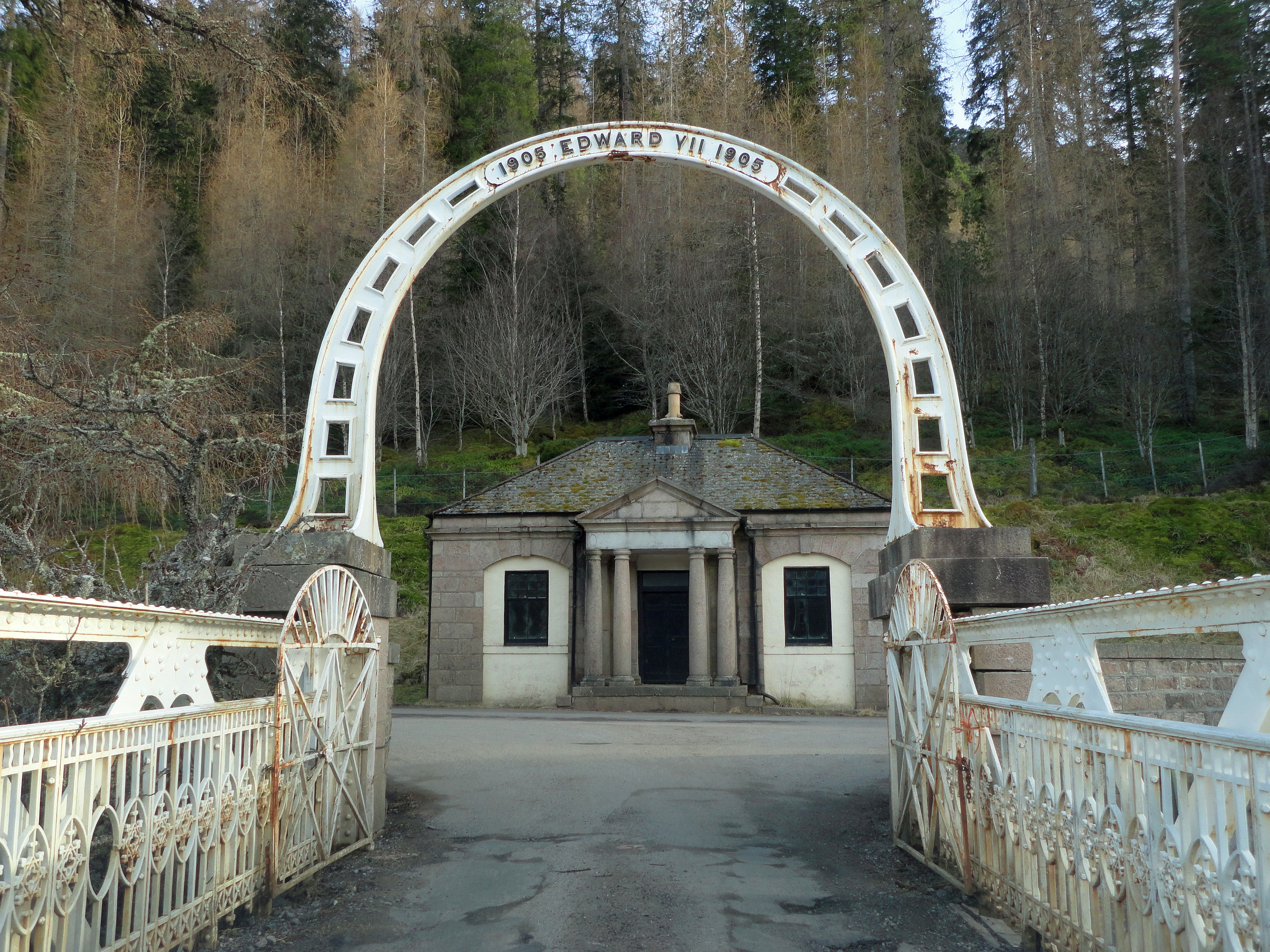
Victoria Bridge, view towards the Gate House

== See also ==
- Places, place names, and structures on Mar Lodge Estate
- List of bridges in Scotland
