= Polhollick Bridge =

Bridge over the River Dee near Ballater, Aberdeenshire

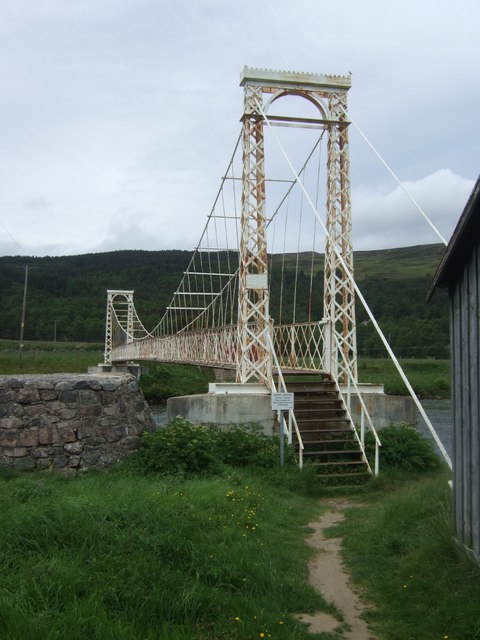
- View from approaching path
- Coordinates: 57.05504°N 3.08341°W
- OS grid reference: NO 34381 96519
- Carries: Footpath
- Crosses: River Dee
- Locale: Aberdeenshire
- Owner: Aberdeenshire Council
- Preceded by: Crathie Suspension Bridge
- Followed by: Ballater Bridge

Characteristics
- Design: Suspension
- Material: Steel
- Total length: 170 feet (52 m)
- No. of spans: 1

History
- Opened: 1892
- Replaces: Ferry crossing

Listed Building – Category B
- Official name: Polhollick Suspension Bridge Over River Dee at No 34378 96519
- Designated: 15 April 1971
- Reference no.: LB9295

Location
- Interactive map of Polhollick Bridge

The Polhollick Bridge spans the River Dee near Ballater, Aberdeenshire. It was built in 1892 by James Abernethy, a steel founder in Aberdeen. The bridge had been commissioned by Alexander Gordon as a gift to the area to replace a ferry crossing. Gordon had grown up in the area and witnessed a drowning incident at the ferry. It is a suspension bridge for pedestrians only. The bridge is similar to the nearby Cambus O' May bridge also paid for by Gordon. The bridge suffered severe damage during Storm Frank in December 2015 and reopened after repairs in December 2018.

== Description ==
Polhollick bridge is a footbridge crossing the River Dee around 2 miles (3 km) west of Ballater, Aberdeenshire. The bridge was paid for by Alexander Gordon, a wealthy brewer who had grown up in the area, and replaced an earlier ferry crossing. Gordon had witnessed a drowning incident involving a newly-married couple on the ferry crossing. The bridge was built in 1892 by James Abernethy and Co. steel founders in Ferry Hill, Aberdeen. It is a suspension bridge with lattice towers, sat on lozenge-shaped abutments, which carry two wire rope cables with ladder-like cross-bar stays. The deck, strengthened by lattice girder trusses, is suspended from the cable by rods. The bridge spans 170 feet (52 m).

The ferry, which pre-dates the late 18th century, was discontinued after the bridge was built. The ferry pier survives at the site, as does the former ferryman's house which is now a private dwelling. The bridge is similar to the Cambus O' May bridge, another donated by Gordon that is sited nearby, but is in a more open environment. The Polhollick bridge is of sturdier construction than its neighbour and G. Nelson, writing in Highland Bridges in 1990, regards it as having "less charm". The bridge forms part of the Seven Bridges walking route and is category B listed.

== Operation ==
The bridge was badly damaged in 1942 when it was hit by an Armstrong Whitworth Whitley bomber aircraft attempting to land on the Dee to put out an engine fire. The bridge was shut between May and October 2015 for repairs costing £300,000; by this time the bridge was subject to a weight limit of four persons at any one time. In December of that year the bridge was badly damaged by high water and floating debris caused by Storm Frank. The Polhollick and Cambus O' May bridges were among the worst affected of the 288 bridges in Aberdeenshire that were damaged by the storm. The bridge was closed for repairs, which included re-straightening the original steelwork using heat and force, until 10 December 2018. Most of the original steelwork was retained. It was one of the last bridges in Aberdeenshire that were damaged during Storm Frank to be repaired; only the Cambus O' May bridge repairs took longer.

== See also ==
- List of bridges in Scotland
