= Laphria =

Laphria may refer to:

- Laphria (fly), a genus of robber flies
- Laphria (festival), an ancient Greek festival for goddess Artemis
