= Mount Keen =

Mountain in Scotland

Coordinates: 56.96952°N 2.97370°W

- Scottish Gaelic: Monadh Caoin
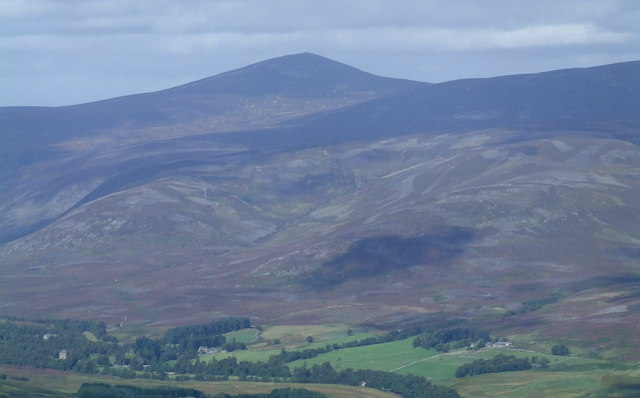

Highest point
- Elevation: 939 m (3,081 ft)
- Prominence: c. 312 m
- Listing: Munro, Marilyn

Naming
- Pronunciation: Scottish Gaelic: [ˈmɔnəɣ ˈkʰɯːɲ]

Geography
- Location: Aberdeenshire / Angus, Scotland
- Parent range: Grampian Mountains
- OS grid: NO409869

Mount Keen (Scottish Gaelic: Monadh Caoin) is a 939-metre-high (3,081 ft) mountain in Scotland and the most easterly Munro. It can be accessed from several directions, South from Glen Mark, North from Glen Tanar, and East to Braid Cairn. It is a moderate walk which is most popularly started by mountain bike, riding through the native Caledonian pine forest of Glen Tanar from Aboyne. On a good day, the Cairngorms, especially Lochnagar, can be seen. The summit is marked by a trig point.

== Path quality ==
Path quality is very good on the approach to the mountain. There is a wide forestry track most of the way to the foot of the mountain if approaching from Aboyne and Glen Tanar. The path quality on the mountain itself is also good on this route although it becomes quite rocky near the top and can be frozen and slippery in winter months.

== Summit ==
Mobile phone reception is excellent from the summit for Vodafone and O2 users and possibly many others as there is a direct line of sight with the Durris mast. There is a steep drop to the East of the summit so in icy conditions care should be taken. Limited shelter can be taken beside large boulders and a trig point allows walkers to collect their bearings.

In 2002 the footbridge at the base of Mount Keen on the Glen Tanar side was washed away. To allow for improved access to this popular Munro the bridge has been replaced.
