= Aboyne Bridge =

20th century bridge in Aberdeenshire, Scotland

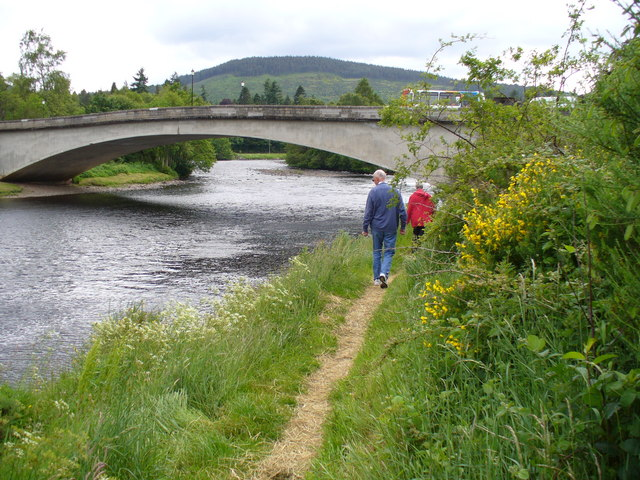
- Bridge crossing the River Dee
- Coordinates: 57.06997°N 2.78715°W
- OS grid reference: NO 52370 97935
- Carries: B968
- Crosses: River Dee
- Locale: Aberdeenshire
- Preceded by: Dinnet Bridge
- Followed by: Potarch Bridge

Characteristics
- Material: Reinforced concrete

History
- Built: 1937

Listed Building – Category B
- Official name: Aboyne, Bridgeview Road, Aboyne Bridge, Over River Dee
- Designated: 29 March 2000
- Reference no.: LB47060

Location
- Interactive map of Aboyne Bridge

Aboyne Bridge is a road bridge to the south of Aboyne in Aberdeenshire, Scotland.

The current bridge dates from c. 1937 and is constructed of reinforced concrete. It has a novel design, with a hinged frame for flood resilience, and is Category B listed.

== History ==
In 1829, a great flood swept away the existing bridge, built only a year earlier. The Earl of Aboyne had a new suspension bridge built in 1831.

A new bridge to replace the suspension bridge at an estimated cost of £30,000 was approved by the Minister of Transport in April 1938.

The bridge was closed to vehicular traffic on 10 November 2023 for structural inspections. Intrusive investigations found that the bridge was in a poor condition which resulted in an extended closure being announced later in the month. It is expected to remain closed for up to 18 months.

== See also ==
- List of bridges in Scotland
