= The Earl of Aboyne (song) =

Song

Song
- Genre: Folk

The Earl of Aboyne, also known as "Peggy Irvine", is a folk song about an Earl of Aboyne who commits adultery – much to the dismay of his wife, the titular Peggy Irvine. The song is not based on any historic events, and consists of rather "confusing" events.

"[T]hough the first Earl of Aboyne was married to an Irvine," says American folklorist Kenneth S. Goldstein, "this ballad is not based on an actual occurrence."

The song has a Roud index number of 99. Additionally, it is Child ballad No. 235.

== Synopsis ==
The Earl of Aboyne visits London, leaving his wife (Peggy Irvine or Peggy Ewan) behind; however, his wife hears that the Earl has been courting other women, so when the Earl returns, she puts on a show for him, disdaining him in the process. The Earl of Aboyne leaves once again, telling his wife not to join him. She then dies of heartbreak and the Earl is remorseful.

== Legacy ==
- In 1956, folk singer Ewan MacColl included a cover of this song in his and A.L. Lloyd's Riverside anthology The English and Scottish Popular Ballads (The Child Ballads) Volume IV.
- In 1977, folk singer June Tabor included a cover of this song on her Topic album Ashes and Diamonds, accompanied by Nic Jones on the guitar and Jon Gillaspie on the synthesizer.

== See also ==
- The Earl of Aboyne
- List of folk songs by Roud number
