= Aboyne Golf Club =

Coordinates: 57.08399°N 2.77022°W

Aboyne Golf Club is the oldest golf course in Royal Deeside, Scotland. It lies southwest of the Loch of Aboyne.

The golf club was originally a nine-hole course and existed as early as 1881. The golf course was designed by golfer and architect Archie Simpson before being redesigned by Martin Hawtree. The new 18 hole course is around 6000 yards and opened in August 1991. The first nine holes are in wooded parkland with the ninth finishing near the Loch of Aboyne. The course then changes to heathland. There is also evidence of ridge and furrow topography caused by medieval farming.

The club is an affiliated member of Scottish Golf and hosts various national competitions on behalf of Scottish Golf and the R&A.
