= Aboyne =

Town in Aberdeenshire, Scotland

Coordinates: 57.075°N 2.781°W

Aboyne: Scottish Gaelic: Abèidh; Scots: Abyne
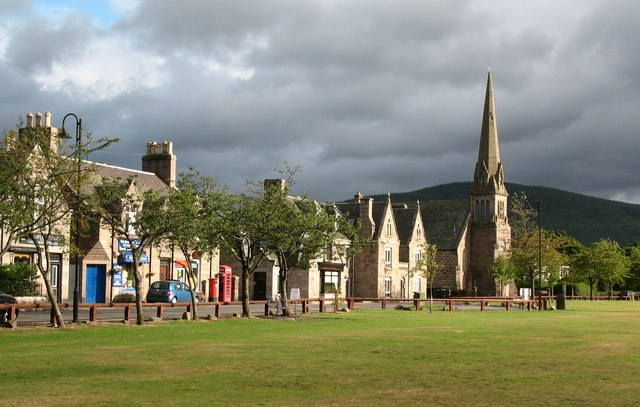
- The Green in Aboyne

- Location within Aberdeenshire
- Population: 2,920 (2020)
- OS grid reference: NO527986
  - Edinburgh: 79 mi (127 km)
  - London: 399 mi (642 km)
- Council area: Aberdeenshire
- Lieutenancy area: Aberdeenshire
- Country: Scotland
- Sovereign state: United Kingdom
- Post town: ABOYNE
- Postcode district: AB34
- Dialling code: 013398
- Police: Scotland
- Fire: Scottish
- Ambulance: Scottish
- UK Parliament: West Aberdeenshire and Kincardine
- Scottish Parliament: Aberdeenshire West

Aboyne (Scots: Abyne, Scottish Gaelic: Abèidh) is a village on the edge of the Highlands in Aberdeenshire, Scotland, on the River Dee, approximately 30 miles (48 km) west of Aberdeen. It has a swimming pool at Aboyne Academy, all-weather tennis courts, a bowling green and is home to the oldest 18 hole golf course on Royal Deeside. Aboyne Castle and the Loch of Aboyne are nearby.

Aboyne has many businesses, including a Co-Op supermarket, several hairdressers, a butcher, a newsagent, an Indian restaurant and a post office. Originally, there was a railway station in the village, but it was closed on 18 June 1966. The station now contains some shops and the tunnel running under the village is now home to a firearms club. The market-day in Aboyne was known as Fèill Mhìcheil (Scottish Gaelic for "Michael's Fair").

== History ==
The name "Aboyne" is derived from "Oboyne", first recorded in 1260, in turn derived from the Gaelic words "abh", "bo", and "fionn", meaning "[place by] white cow river".

The village of Aboyne was founded by Charles Gordon, 1st Earl of Aboyne in 1671, who, in the same year, rebuilt the west wing of Aboyne Castle. The siting of the castle itself is related to the limited number of the crossings of the Mounth of the Grampian Mountains to the south. In 1715 Aboyne was the scene of a tinchal, or great hunt, organised by John Erskine, sixth Earl of Mar, on 3 September, as a cover for the gathering of Jacobite nobles and lairds to discuss a planned Jacobite rising. The uprising began three days later in Braemar.

The former Aboyne Public School was used as a secondary school to the local area, but was notably used during WWII as an evacuee station for those coming from Glasgow. Local Aboyne children were educated in the morning and the evacuee children were educated in the afternoon. Any overflow evacuees were passed on to the nearby church hall, and as many as 1,250 were evacuated to the Deeside area in 1939.

== Religion ==
An eighth-century Christian presence in Aboyne is attested by a Pictish stone cross called the Formaston Stone. The slab is inscribed with Ogham characters which have been transliterated as “MAQQOoiTALLUORRH | NxHHTVROBBACCxNNEVV.” These are the Pictish names Talorc (TALLUORRH) and Nehht (NxHHT), both of which were names of kings. In fact, the Pictish king Nechtan (d. 732) was said by Bede to have accepted the Christian faith in response to the teachings of Adamnan, abbot of Iona, eventually bringing his people to Christianity as well. Aboyne's first church was dedicated to Adamnan, and it was at the burial ground of this church where the Formaston Stone was first discovered. The stone was eventually removed to Aboyne Castle and is currently exhibited in the Inverurie Museum.

In 1237, Alexander II granted the Knights Templar a charter of liberty to acquire lands in Scotland, and Walter Byset, Lord of Aboyne, gave the Templar preceptory the church of Aboyne. Then, between 1239 and 1249, the church was conveyed to the Templars adproprier usus by Ralph, Bishop of Aberdeen. According to the terms of the charter, the Templars would take charge of the temporalities of the church and maintain a vicar there, while the bishop retained authority in spiritual matters. King Alexander II confirmed the donation on 15 April 1242, and Pope Alexander IV, in 1277, the same year that John of Annan, chaplain to Alexander III, was appointed vicar. Aboyne, along with other Templar possessions in Scotland, was held by the Torphichen Preceptory in the fifteenth and sixteenth centuries and remained so until the Reformation.

In 1761, a new parish church was constructed in Aboyne, under the patronage of the Marquess of Huntly; then, in 1842, another church was built on the site of the eighteenth-century structure, and in 1929 at the Union of the Established Church, it was formally dedicated to St. Machar. In 1936, St. Machar's was joined with the United Free Church, and fifty years later, was linked with the parish church of Dinnet, a linkage which led to the 1993 union between the two, which is now known as the Aboyne-Dinnet Parish Church. In 2006, Aboyne-Dinnet was linked with the parish church at Cromar.

== Climate ==
Aboyne has an oceanic climate (Köppen: Cfb), similar to most of the United Kingdom. Due to its high inland position in Scotland, Aboyne can record some very low temperatures and some high snowfall. Conversely, temperatures can reach exceptional values for the latitude, particularly during the winter months due to the foehn effect; it holds the March record for the highest temperature in Scotland, with 23.6 °C (74.5 °F) on 27 March 2012. The February record for Scotland was broken on 21 February 2019 at 18.3 °C.

Climate data for Aboyne (140 m or 459 ft asl, averages 1991–2020)
Month	Jan	Feb	Mar	Apr	May	Jun	Jul	Aug	Sep	Oct	Nov	Dec	Year
Record high °C (°F)	18.3 (64.9)	18.3 (64.9)	23.6 (74.5)	25.0 (77.0)	28.4 (83.1)	30.3 (86.5)	31.6 (88.9)	29.7 (85.5)	28.5 (83.3)	21.4 (70.5)	19.0 (66.2)	17.2 (63.0)	31.6 (88.9)
Mean daily maximum °C (°F)	6.3 (43.3)	7.1 (44.8)	9.2 (48.6)	11.9 (53.4)	15.0 (59.0)	17.3 (63.1)	19.4 (66.9)	18.8 (65.8)	16.5 (61.7)	12.5 (54.5)	8.8 (47.8)	6.3 (43.3)	12.5 (54.5)
Daily mean °C (°F)	2.7 (36.9)	3.2 (37.8)	4.8 (40.6)	7.0 (44.6)	9.6 (49.3)	12.4 (54.3)	14.4 (57.9)	13.8 (56.8)	11.8 (53.2)	8.4 (47.1)	5.0 (41.0)	2.7 (36.9)	8.0 (46.4)
Mean daily minimum °C (°F)	−0.9 (30.4)	−0.7 (30.7)	0.4 (32.7)	2.1 (35.8)	4.2 (39.6)	7.6 (45.7)	9.4 (48.9)	8.8 (47.8)	7.0 (44.6)	4.2 (39.6)	1.2 (34.2)	−1.0 (30.2)	3.6 (38.5)
Record low °C (°F)	−23.2 (−9.8)	−21.4 (−6.5)	−16.7 (1.9)	−10.5 (13.1)	−6.3 (20.7)	−3.4 (25.9)	−1.3 (29.7)	−2.5 (27.5)	−4.3 (24.3)	−9.1 (15.6)	−18.3 (−0.9)	−22.2 (−8.0)	−23.2 (−9.8)
Average rainfall mm (inches)	69.0 (2.72)	50.4 (1.98)	50.3 (1.98)	57.5 (2.26)	55.7 (2.19)	64.0 (2.52)	75.4 (2.97)	68.1 (2.68)	59.8 (2.35)	95.4 (3.76)	86.5 (3.41)	68.4 (2.69)	800.4 (31.51)
Average rainy days (≥ 1 mm)	11.8	10.5	10.5	10.0	10.9	11.1	11.8	11.1	9.1	12.5	13.4	11.7	134.5
Source 1: Met Office
Source 2: Starlings Roost Weather

== Tourism and culture ==
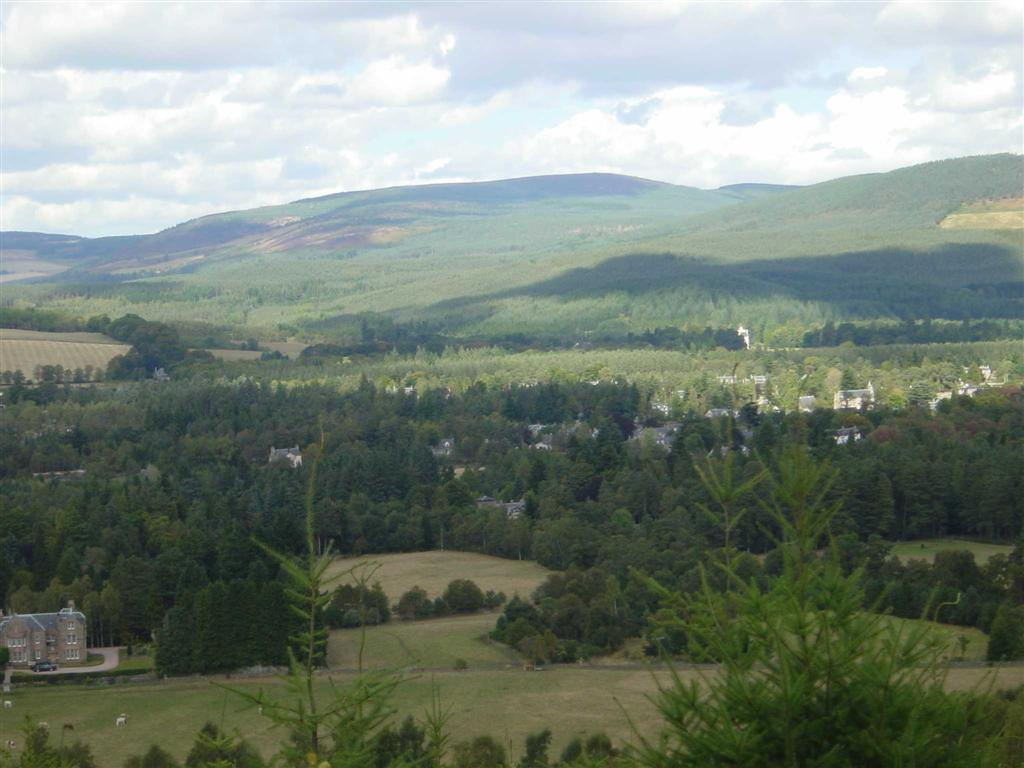
Aboyne as seen from the "Fungle" footpath.

In summer, when tourists visit, the number of people and vehicles increases dramatically. The Highland Games on the Village Green features in August. The green includes facilities for rugby and football and a play park as well as Aboyne Canoe Clubs storage facility 'The Canoe Cathedral'.

The British Royal Family are residents in nearby Balmoral Castle during the Summer.

Outdoor pursuits include golf, walking, cycling, mountain biking trails, kayaking, canoeing and gliding from the airfield just outside the village. Aboyne has become popular with gliding enthusiasts from Britain and Europe due to its suitable air currents (due to the surrounding terrain). The airfield has two parallel tarmac runways running east–west, a webcam and small weather-monitoring centre on its premises. Aboyne contains a mountain biking facility at Aboyne Bike Park located in the Bellwood.

The old Aboyne Curling Club had its own private railway station, Aboyne Curling Pond railway station, at the Loch of Aboyne.

The close by pass of Ballater is a rock-climbing area. The village of Dinnet is a few miles west and is the first being located inside the Cairngorms National Park. Walkers and cyclists can ascend Mount Keen by cycling as far as they can from Glen Tanar forest before walking to the summit.

There are two schools, Aboyne Academy and a primary school. The academy has around 650 pupils, about a quarter from Aboyne itself, with the remaining three quarters from surrounding villages. The primary school has around 240 children and also contains a nursery with around 30 children. The school has access to a full-size swimming pool and gym run by the adjacent Deeside Community Centre.

Belwade Farm, a horse sanctuary, is situated nearby.

A small stone circle is situated in the village, with several other megaliths nearby, notably the Tomnaverie stone circle, which is also the site of a disused Royal Observer Corps monitoring post.

Aboyne is twinned with Martignas-sur-Jalle, a commune in Nouvelle-Aquitaine in the southwest of France.

== Public transport ==
The village is served by the 201/202 bus service operated by Stagecoach which provides a regular bus service to Aberdeen, Banchory, Ballater and Braemar. Ember's E11 from Aberdeen to Dundee also serves the village (prebooked).

- Aboyne Bridge, to the south of Aboyne

== Notable people ==
- Charles Begg (c.1825–1874) - New Zealand piano manufacturer, piano tuner and music shop proprietor
- Hollie Davidson (born 1992) - Scottish professional rugby union referee
- Walter Dinnie (1850–1923) - police officer, private detective and land board chairman

== See also ==
- List of listed buildings in Aboyne and Glen Tanar
