= River Dee, Aberdeenshire =

River in Aberdeenshire, Scotland

River Dee
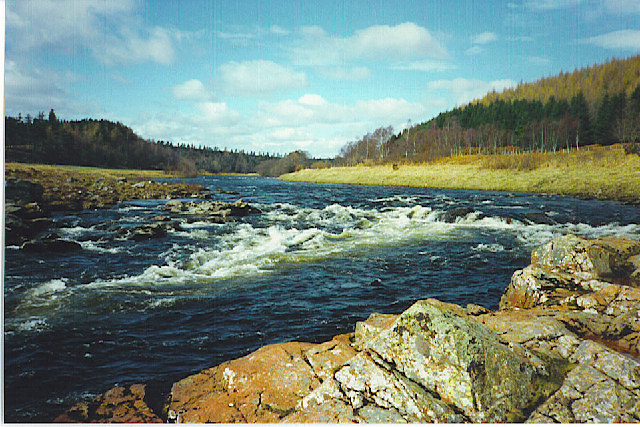
- The River Dee at Potarch which is between Aboyne and Banchory

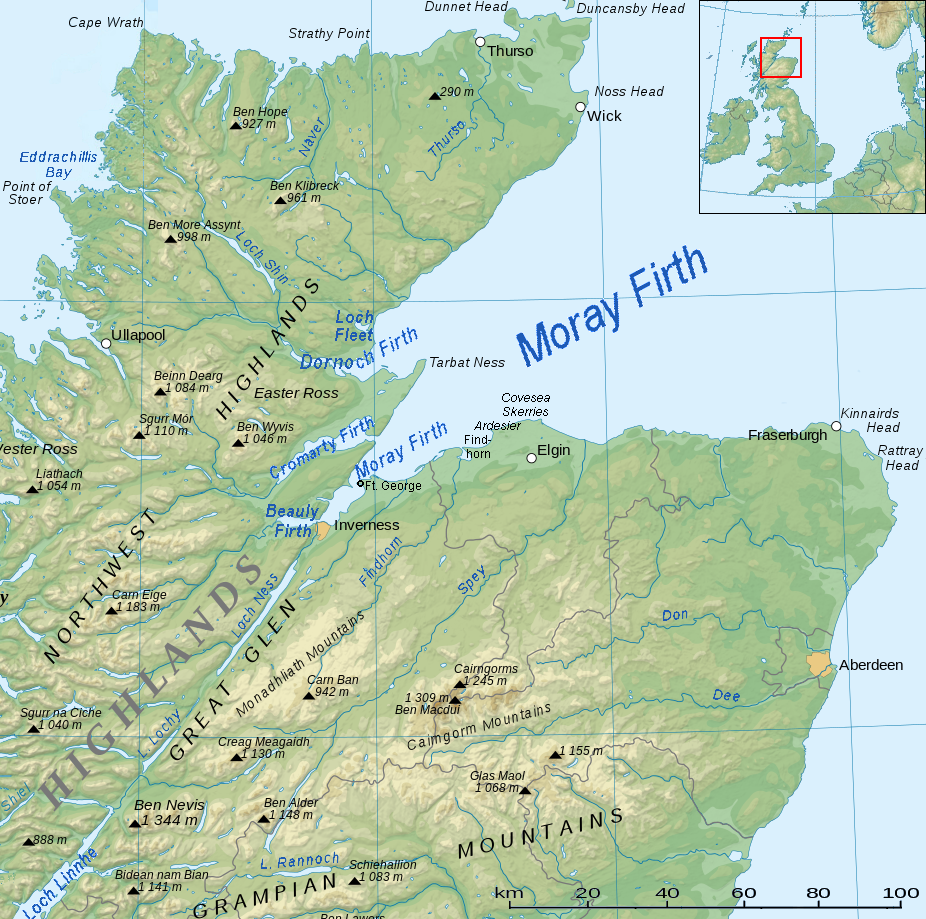
- The north east of Scotland showing the location of the Dee
- Native name: Uisge Dhè (Scottish Gaelic)

Location
- Country: Scotland
- County: Aberdeenshire

Physical characteristics
- Source
  - location: Wells of Dee, Braeriach, Cairngorms
  - elevation: 1,220 m (4,000 ft)
- Mouth
  - location: Aberdeen
  - coordinates: 57°08′32″N 2°04′02″W
- Length: 140 km (87 mi)
- Basin size: 2,100 km^{2} (810 sq mi)
- Discharge
  - location: Aberdeen

The River Dee (Scottish Gaelic: Uisge Dhè) is a river in Aberdeenshire, Scotland. It rises in the Cairngorms and flows through southern Aberdeenshire to reach the North Sea at Aberdeen. The area it passes through is known as Deeside, or Royal Deeside in the region between Braemar and Banchory because Queen Victoria came for a visit there in 1848 and greatly enjoyed herself. She and her husband, Prince Albert, built Balmoral Castle there which replaced an older castle.

Deeside is a popular area for tourists, due to the combination of its scenery and historic royal associations. It is part of the Cairngorms National Park, and the Deeside and Lochnagar National Scenic Area. The Dee is popular with anglers and is one of the most famous salmon fishing rivers in the world.

The New Statistical Account of Scotland attributed the name Dee as having been used as early as the second century AD in the work of the Alexandrian geographer Claudius Ptolemy, as Δηοῦα (=Deva), meaning 'goddess'. This indicated the river had divine status in the beliefs of the ancient inhabitants of the area. The Gaelic name Uisge Dhè literally means 'Water of God'. There are several other rivers with the same name in Great Britain, and they are believed to have similar derivations, as may the Dee's near neighbour to the north which is the River Don.

== Geography ==
=== Upper reaches ===
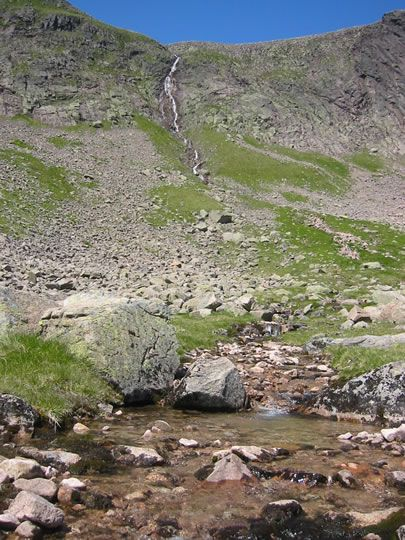
Falls of Dee in An Garbh Choire

The River Dee rises from a spring on the Braeriach plateau in the Cairngorm Mountains at a height of at about 1,220 m, the highest source of any major river in the British Isles. Emerging in a number of pools called the Wells of Dee the young Dee then flows across the plateau to the cliff edge from where the Falls of Dee plunge into An Garbh Choire ("burn of the rough corrie"). The river is then joined by a tributary coming from the Pools of Dee in the Lairig Ghru, and flows south down the Lairig Ghru between Ben Macdui and Cairn Toul, tumbling over falls in the Chest of Dee on its way to White Bridge and the confluence with the Geldie Burn, at which point it turns east.

=== Linn of Dee ===
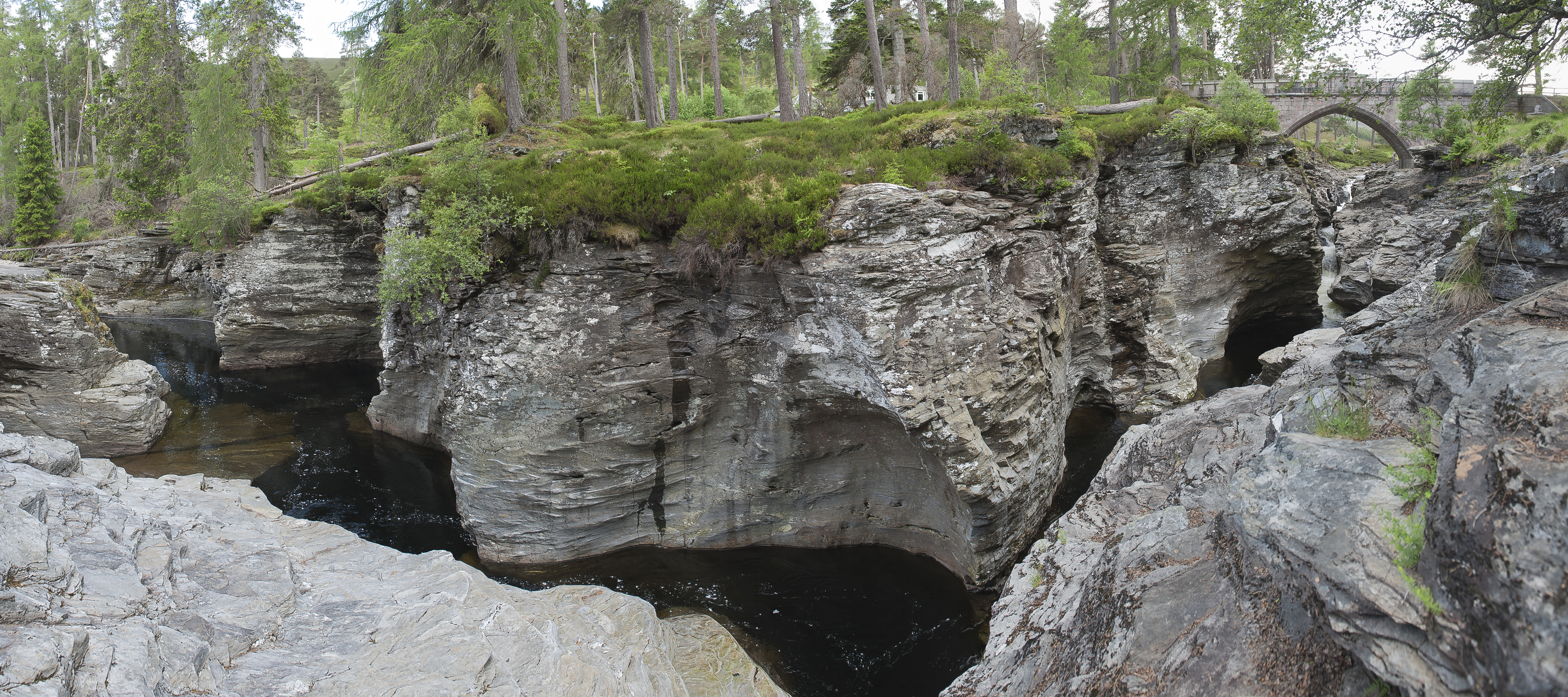
Linn of Dee above Braemar

At Linn of Dee the river passes east through a 300-metre natural rock gorge, a spot much favoured by Queen Victoria during her stays at Balmoral. The queen opened the bridge which spans the Dee at this point in 1857. Between Linn of Dee and Braemar the Lui Water (formed by the Luibeg and Derry burns) and the Quoich Water join the growing River Dee. The River Clunie enters the Dee at Braemar. Evidence of human activity stretching as far back as c. 8,200 BC has been found at a complex of sites stretching along the banks of the Dee.

=== Strathdee ===
Through Deeside the river passes Braemar, Balmoral Castle, Ballater, Dinnet, Aboyne, and Banchory reaching the sea at Aberdeen. Near Ballater two rivers are tributaries: the River Gairn flowing from the north and the River Muick which flows out of Loch Muick, from the south. The river is within the Cairngorms National Park until it reaches Dinnet. The Water of Tanar flows through Glen Tanar before joining at Aboyne. The Water of Feugh has its confluence with the Dee near the Falls of Feugh at Banchory and Coy Burn enters at Milton of Crathes.

The tidal limit is just above Bridge of Dee which was built about 1720; it carries the main A90 trunk road from Aberdeen to the south. Before reaching the North Sea, the river passes through Aberdeen Harbour, the principal marine centre for the energy industry in Europe, servicing the offshore oil and gas industry. An artificial channel was constructed in 1872 to straighten the river's flow into the sea. Footdee ("Fittie") is an old fishing village at the east end of Aberdeen Harbour.

== Nature and conservation ==
Deeside and Lochnagar National Scenic Area
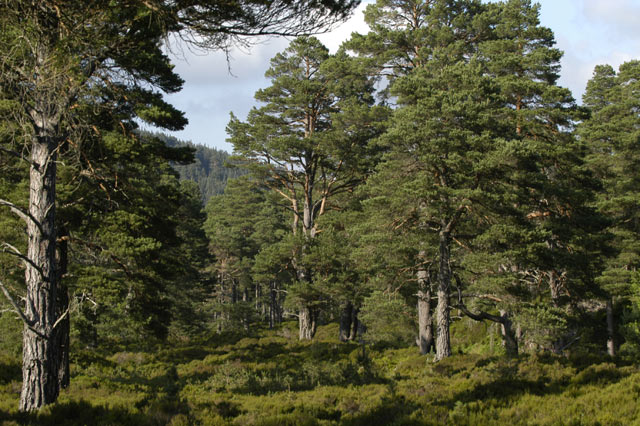
- Caledonian pine forest, Glen Tanar
- Interactive map of Deeside and Lochnagar National Scenic Area
- Location: Aberdeenshire, Scotland
- Area: 400 km^{2} (150 sq mi)
- Established: 1981
- Governing body: NatureScot

The Dee is important for nature conservation and the area has many designated sites. The upper catchment down to Inverey is within the Mar Lodge Estate, which is owned by the National Trust for Scotland and has been classified as a national nature reserve since May 2017.

The Cairngorms National Park which was established in 2003 covers the whole of the catchment of the Dee, including the tributaries, down to as far as Dinnet. As well as being included as part of the Cairngorms National Park, the Deeside area along with the mountains surrounding Lochnagar as far south as the head of Glen Doll is classified as the Deeside and Lochnagar National Scenic Area. It is one of 40 areas in Scotland designated as a scenic area. The Deeside and Lochnagar National Scenic Area covers 40,000 ha, extending from the Geldie down to Ballater.

The entire length of the Dee is defined as a Special Area of Conservation (SAC) due to its importance to salmon, otters and freshwater pearl mussels. Other SACs within the Deeside area include Glen Tanar, the Muir of Dinnet, Ballochbuie, and the Morrone Birkwood. The southern side of Deeside is classified as a Special Protection Area, due to the area's importance to golden eagles.

Much of the semi-natural Caledonian pine forest in Scotland is within the Dee catchment. The area contains nationally rare examples of pine woods, birch woods and heather moors with associated wildlife. On the valley floor there are deciduous alder and mixed broadleaved woods as well as meadow grasslands.

The Dee is a popular salmon river and has a succession of varied pools which are intersected by sharp rapids. In 1995 it was estimated that salmon fishing on the river contributed between £5 and £6 million a year to the Grampian Region economy. In 2020 it was estimated that salmon fishing contributed £15 million a year to the local economy and the River Dee reporting 10% of Scottish salmon catches. The River Dee operates a catch and release practise and all salmon which are caught must be released back to the river.

== Transport on Deeside ==
The A93 road runs west along the north bank of the river from Aberdeen to Braemar before it turns south, leaving Deeside, to climb to the Glenshee Ski Centre at Cairnwell Pass and then onwards to Perth. Just west of Ballater the A939 Lecht Road leaves the A93 to take a tortuous climb towards the Lecht Ski Centre then on to Tomintoul and eventually Nairn. Beyond Braemar a narrow road continues along the south side of the Dee as far as Linn of Dee, at which point it doubles back to terminate at Linn of Quioch on the north bank of the Dee. There are no paved roads into the Cairngorms beyond Linn of Dee, although two walking routes, the Lairig Ghru and the Lairig an Laoigh, continue via passes in the mountains to reach Speyside.

Until 1966 the Deeside Railway ran from Aberdeen to Ballater, operated by the Great North of Scotland Railway. The line opened from Aberdeen to Banchory in 1853, was extended to Aboyne in 1859, and a further extension to Ballater was opened in 1866. The line was not extended beyond Ballater to Braemar as this would require it to run close to Balmoral, leading to objections from Queen Victoria.

The Royal Family used Ballater Station when visiting Balmoral. After the line closed, the station was converted into a rail museum. It was destroyed by fire in 2015 and has since been restored, now providing a tourist information centre, restaurant, tearoom and public library. A very short section of the line near Milton of Crathes has been restored as a heritage railway, named the Royal Deeside Railway.

== Royal Deeside ==
Since the reign of Queen Victoria the British royal family have spent their summers at Balmoral Castle. Each year they attend the Braemar Highland Gathering and other local events. Birkhall which was previously owned by Queen Elizabeth the Queen Mother, is now a favourite retreat of King Charles. Due to these royal connections, the area around Braemar and Ballater is sometimes referred to "Royal Deeside", and this usage has been encouraged by the tourist trade.

== See also ==
- List of Crossings of the River Dee

== Gallery ==
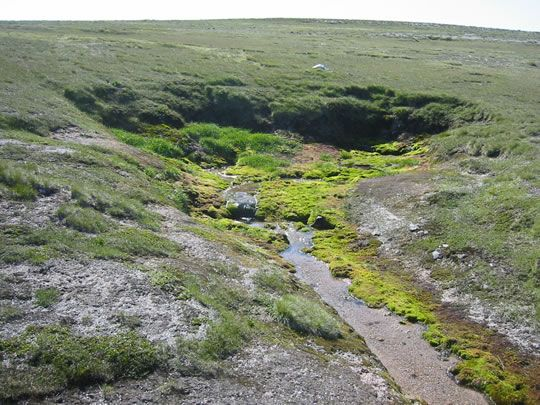
Wells of Dee on Braeriach.

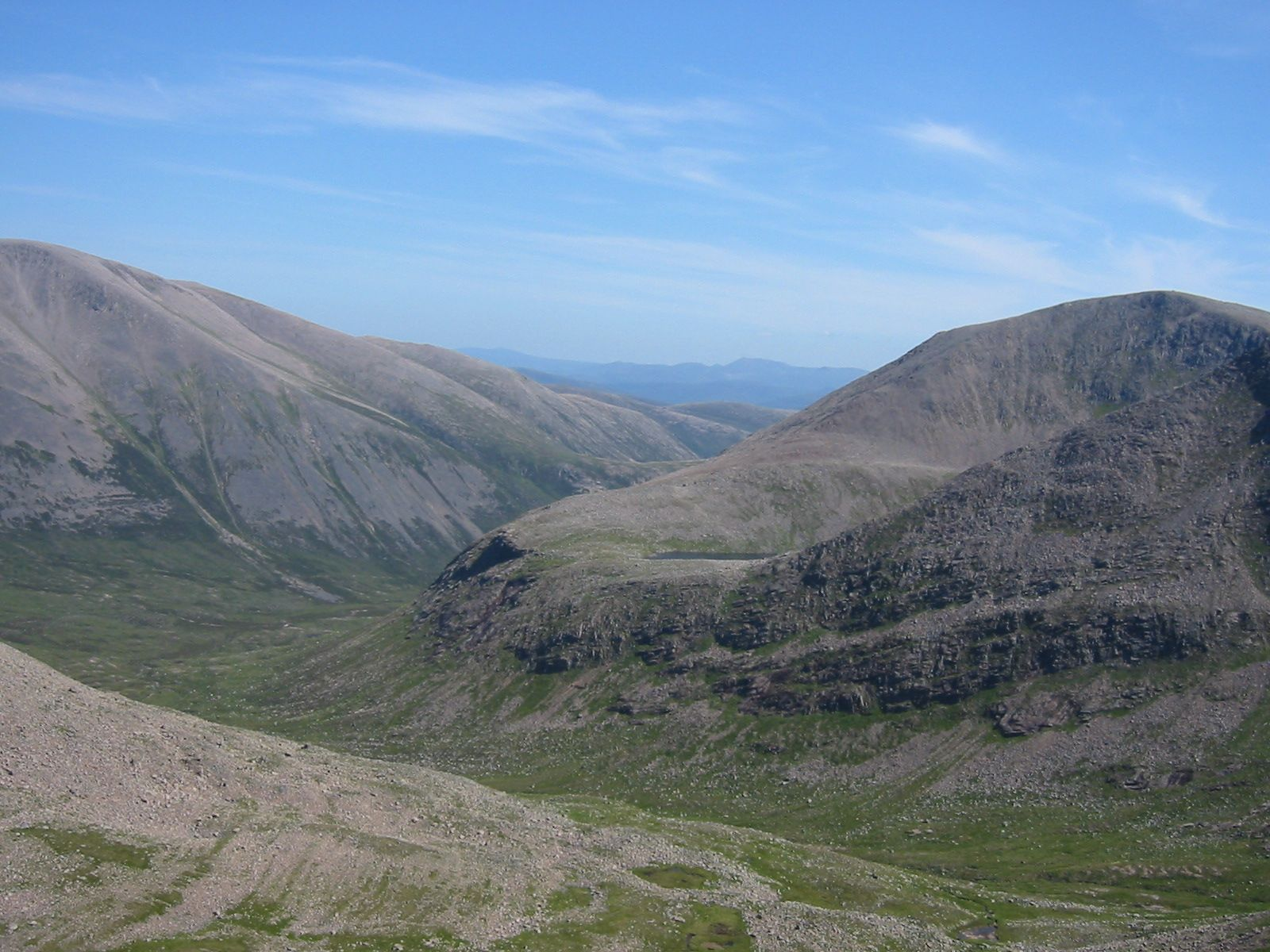
Cairn Toul & Ben Macdui.

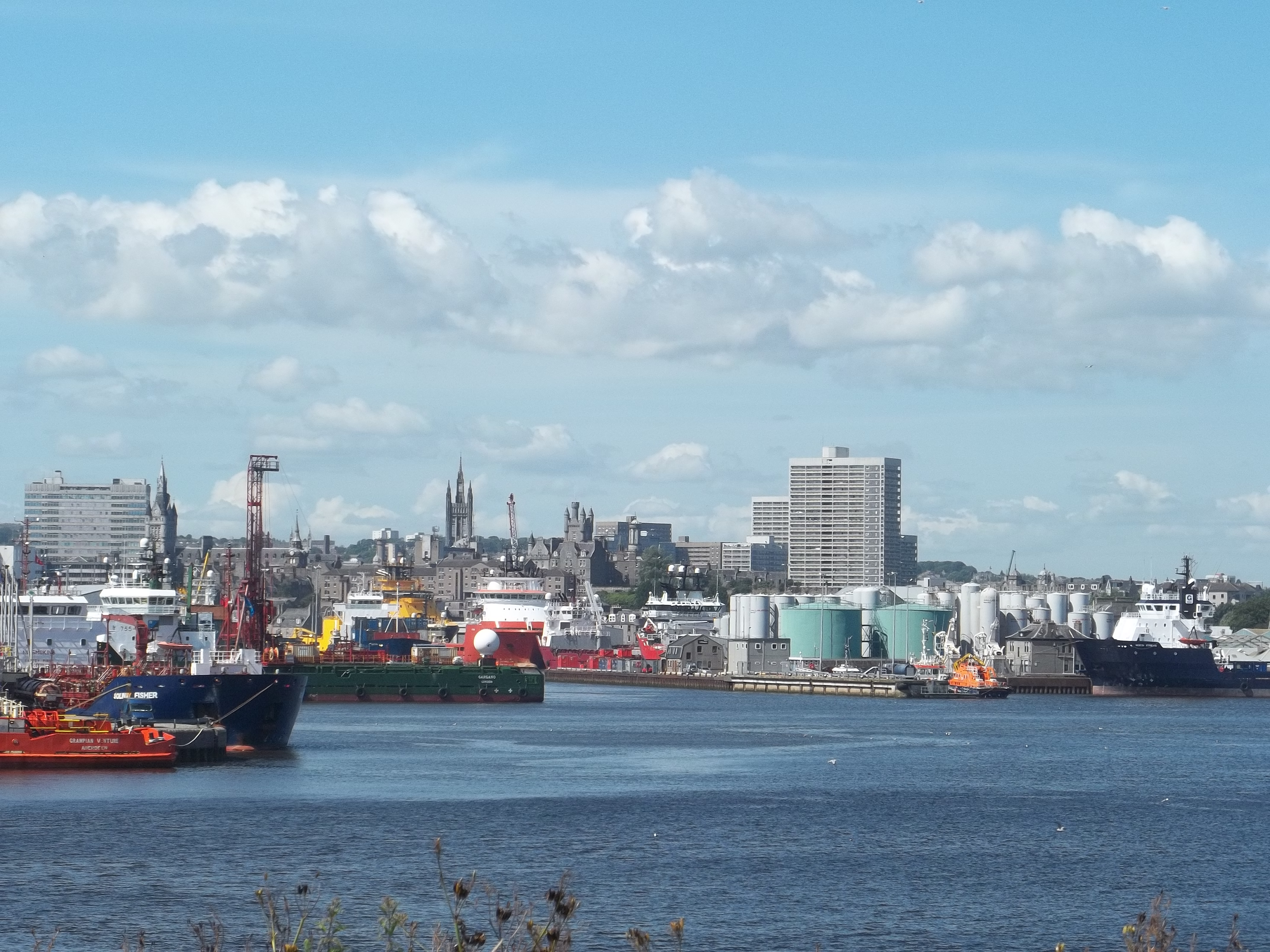
Aberdeen Harbour, at the estuary of the River Dee.

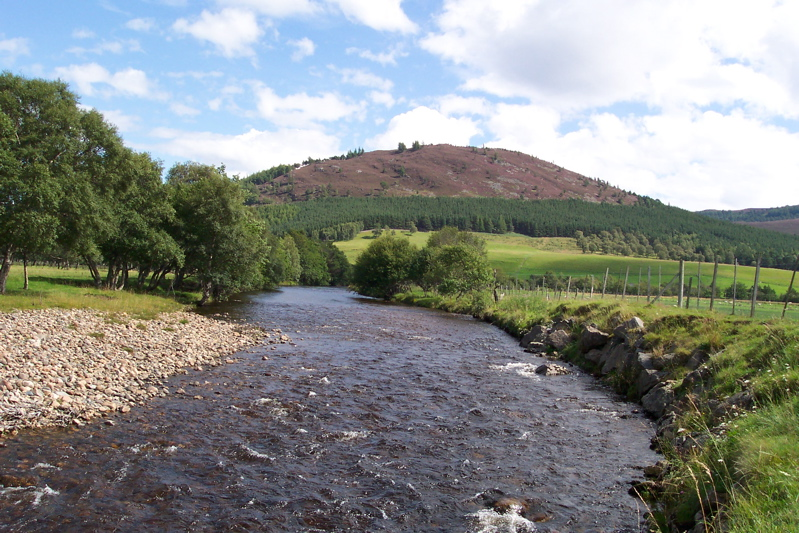
The River Clunie near Braemar.

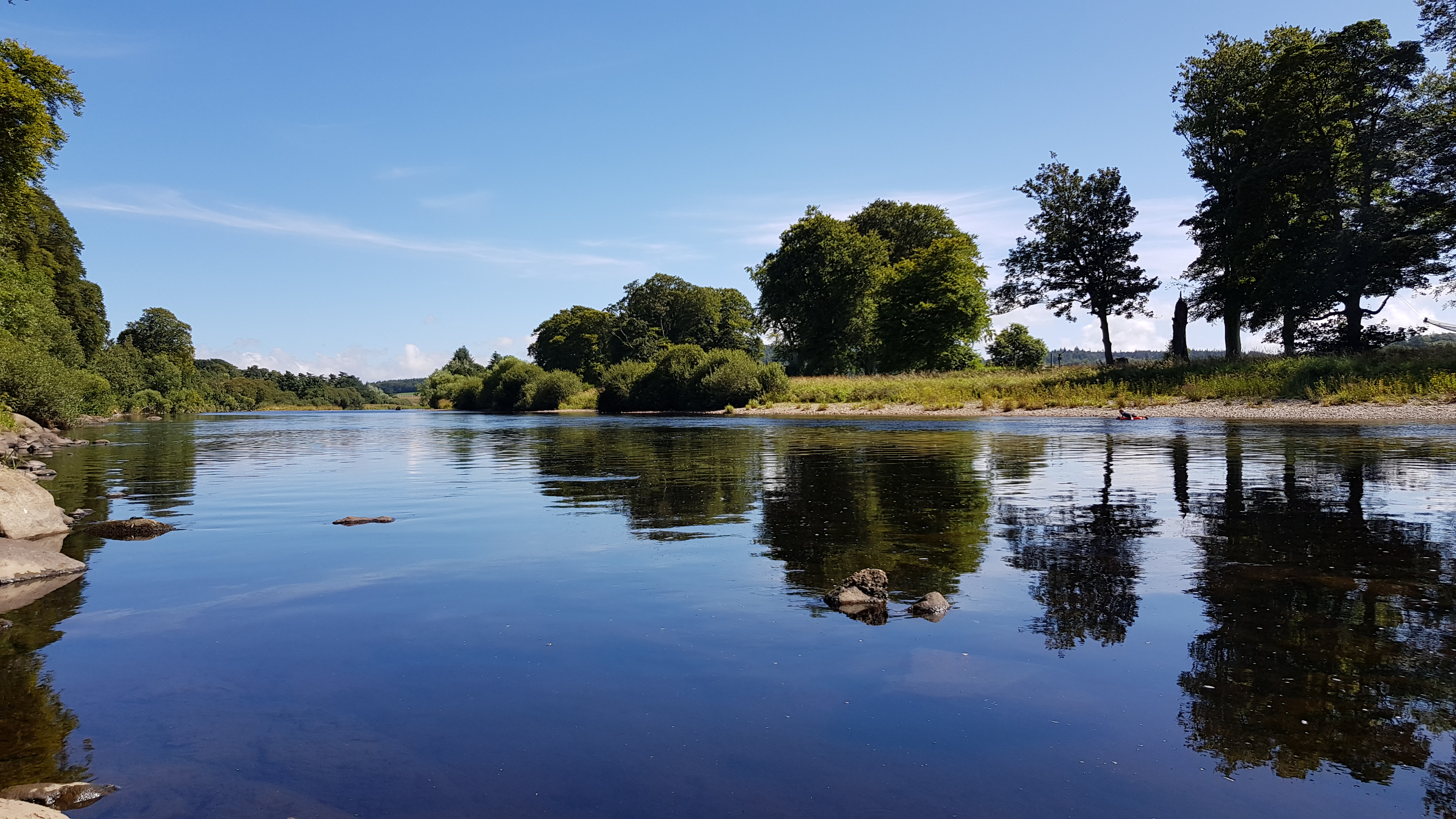
The River Dee at Peterculter, facing downstream.

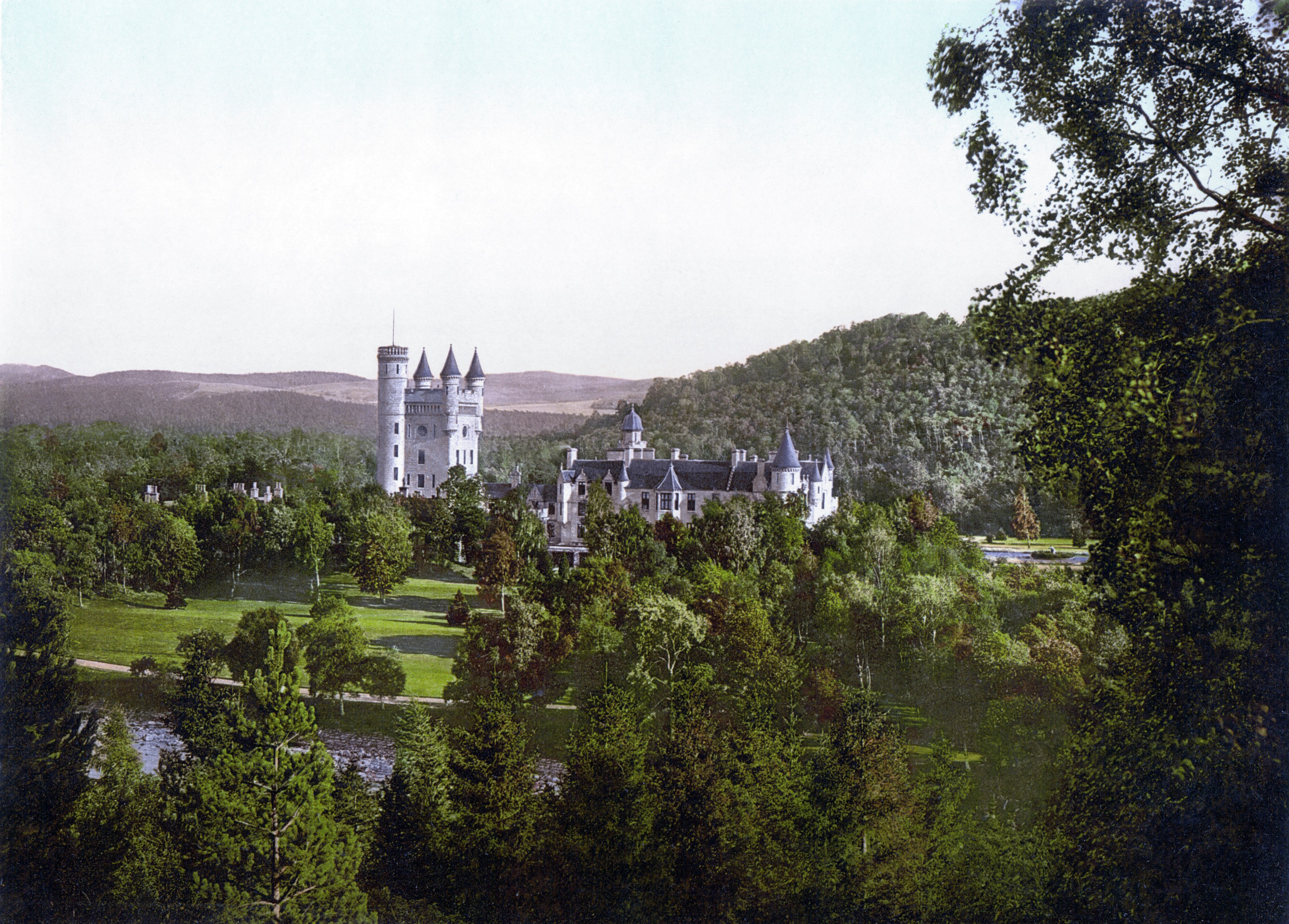
Balmoral Castle in Royal Deeside (photochrom from about 1900).

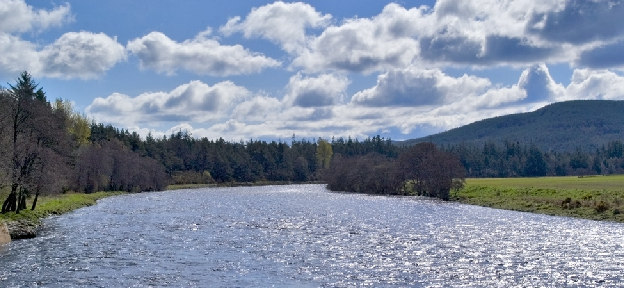
The River Dee

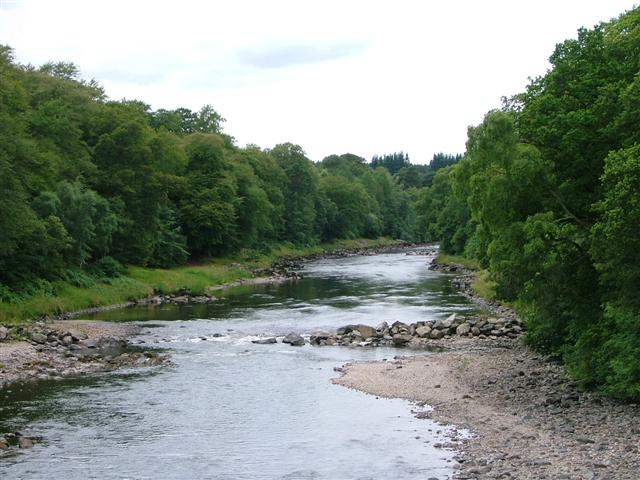
The Dee at Banchory

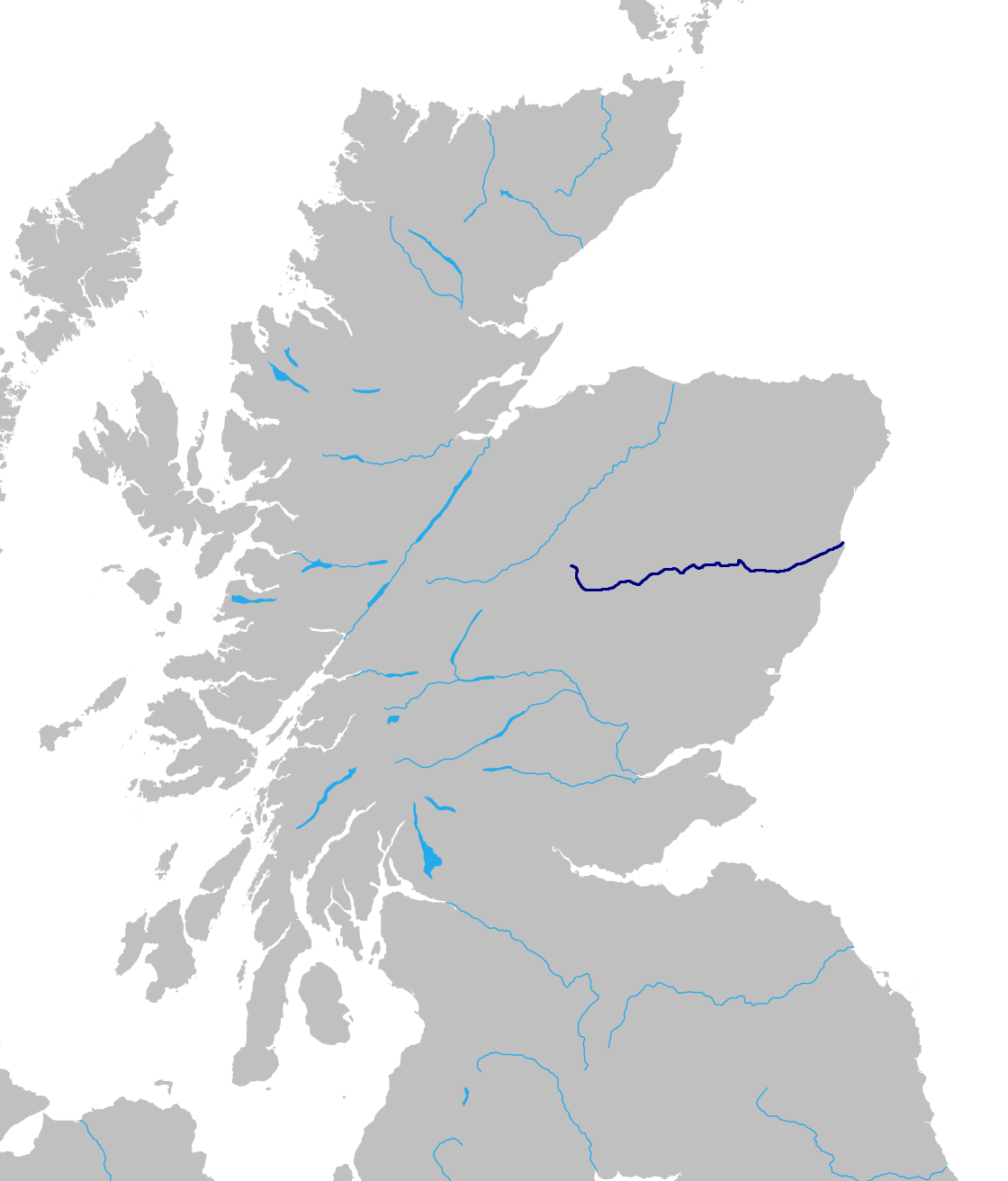
The Dee on a map of Scotland

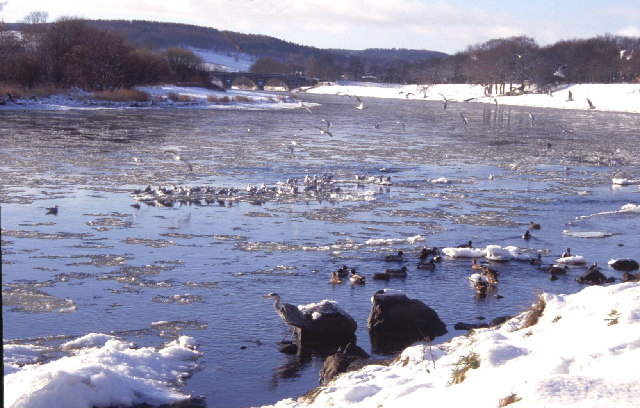
The Dee in winter
