= Brenin Llwyd =

Welsh mythological figure

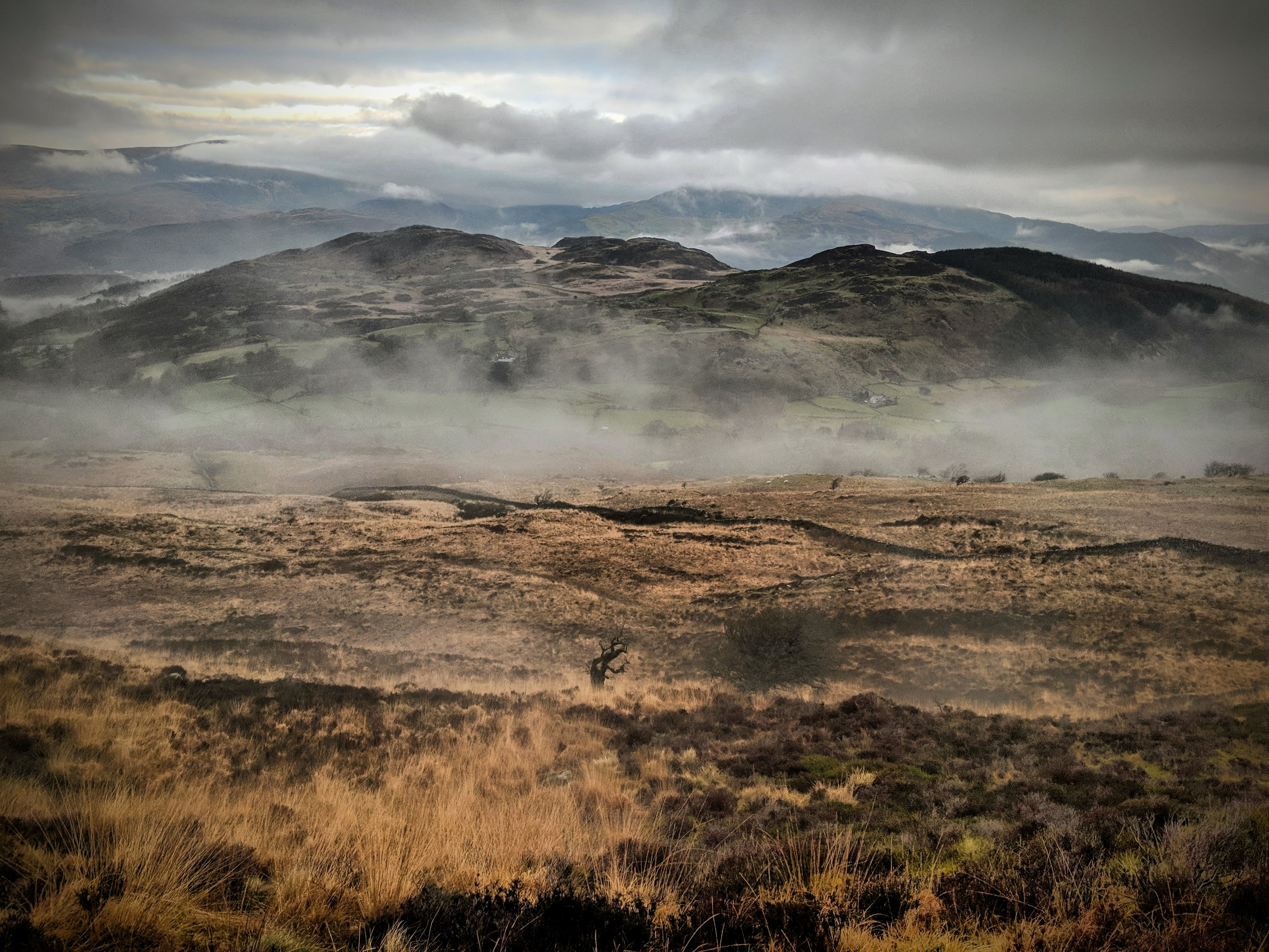
- Grey mists near Cadair Idris, an area notably associated with the Brenin Llwyd

Creature information
- Other name: The Monarch of the Mist
- Grouping: Legendary creature
- Sub grouping: Spirit or Gaint

Origin
- Country: Wales
- Region: Nationwide

Brenin Llwyd (English: Grey King, also known by the sobriquet, The Monarch of the Mist), is a legendary figure in Welsh mythology. Recorded in mountainous locations throughout the country, the figure is always silent, semi-corporeal, is cloaked in mist or a grey cloak and preys on unwary travellers, especially children.

== Description and locations ==
Although Brenin Llwyd is a solitary, individual figure and is not part of any other mythological groups or species, consistent accounts of the Brenin Llwyd are found across Wales, with only minimal variations. An archetypal description of the figure and its localities was given by the folklorist Marie Trevelyan in 1909:

"Stories about the Brenin Llwyd, the Grey King or Monarch of the Mist, were told in the most mountainous districts. In the North, he was described as being very mighty and powerful. He was represented as sitting among the mountains, robed in grey clouds and mist, and woe to anybody who was caught in his clutches! Snowdon and the ranges of it, Cadair Idris, Plinlimmon, and other lofty places, were his favourite haunts. In the south, he was regarded as 'hungering' for victims, and children were warned not to venture too high up the mountains, lest the Brenin Llwyd should seize them."

In the same text, Trevelyan records another encounter in a different locality much further south. This figure is also named Brenin Llwyd and the description closely matches that of the figure in the north:

"An old woman said (…) that many a time she shuddered when they ascended to the mineral wells on the Smaelog, and was glad to come down, because the people and children warned everybody not to linger late, for the Brenin Llwyd would be after them. She was further told that there was no trusting him, for sometimes on the brightest summer evening he would come suddenly and draw them into his clutches."

Trevelyan gives a third account of the figure in Carmarthenshire which has certain embellishments not recorded at other locations. This version is notable for associations with the court of a king, which she names as the "Court of the Mist" and hunting hounds named as "the Dogs of the Sky". These aspects suggest a connection in the area between the Brenin Llwyd and the Welsh version of the Celtic Otherworld, Annwn and the Cŵn Annwn.

== Belyn ap Madog ==
Another legend associated with the Brenin Llwyd is that of the Lord of Merionnydd, Belyn ap Madog. Although young, Belyn was ambitious to restore his family to power and become renowned as a great hero throughout the world. Knowing the old legend that anyone who spent a night on Cadair Idris would either go mad or receive the power of great inspiration (including prophecy), Belyn scaled the mountain and sat at its peak hoping to learn something of his future.

After some hours on the peak, Belyn is said to have felt a great terror come over him and a sensation of suffocating before he became extremely ill. Through a pale light, Belyn glimpsed a number of giant figures which put him in mind of the Brenin Llwyd, the sight was accompanied by the extraordinary sound of rushing water and great winds competing against each other. Belyn heard a loud voice which questioned his ambition and was seemingly able to read Belyn's own thoughts. Finally the voice tells Belyn to "go home and do not try to learn the secrets of the stars" and advises him to avoid battle and fame and instead dedicate his life to helping others.

The next morning, Belyn descended the mountain and headed home. He is said to have looked back at the mountain one last time and observed a number of grey giants at the peak. This time the figures were not frightening, but were looking in his direction with outstretched arms, as if in a blessing.

== Comparisons with other legends ==
While Brenin Llwyd is a singular entity, the tales of the Brenin Llwyd have been compared with other features of Welsh, Celtic and European Mythology. In Wales, the king of the Tylwyth Teg, Gwyn ap Nudd is said to haunt mountain tops and is also associated with the Cŵn Annwn. Similarly, Brenin Llwyd's association with Cadair Idris may be connected with Idris Gawr, the giant who is said to be king of the mountain. Other comparisons have been made with Herne the Hunter and the pan-European motif of the Wild Hunt.

One of the most notable modern comparisons is with the Am Fear Liath Mòr (Scottish Gaelic for 'Big Grey Man'), a similarly ghostly figure associated with the mists on Ben Macdui in the Cairngorms mountain range of Scotland.

== In popular culture ==
=== In literature ===
As with other Welsh legends, aspects of the Brenin Llwyd mythos have been linked to the Middle English romance Gawain and the Green Knight. Roger Sherman Loomis has suggested that the character of Bertilak de Hautdesert is an interpretation of Welsh legends such as the Brenin Llwyd.

The fourth book in Susan Cooper's fantasy series The Dark is Rising, is named The Grey King after the Brenin Llwyd. The novel won the 1976 Newbery Medal.

=== In radio ===
In 2016, comedians Mike Bubbins and John Rutledge investigated the Brenin Llwyd as part of The Unexplainers radio show.

== See also ==
- Am Fear Liath Mòr
- Gwyn ap Nudd
