= Craig yr Aderyn =

Hill in Gwynedd, Wales

Coordinates: 52.6406°N 4.001°W

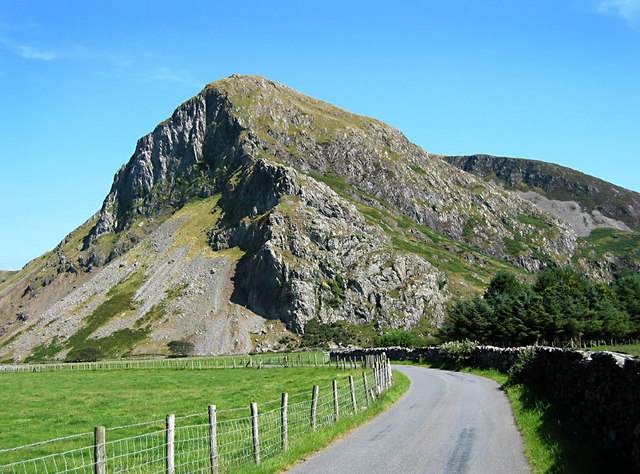
- Craig yr Aderyn

- Location within Gwynedd
- OS grid reference: SH647066
- Principal area: Gwynedd
- Preserved county: Gwynedd
- Country: Wales
- Sovereign state: United Kingdom
- Police: North Wales
- Fire: North Wales
- Ambulance: Welsh

Craig yr Aderyn, also known as Bird's Rock, is a hill rising to a height of 258 metres (846 ft) above sea level on the south bank of the River Dysynni near Llanfihangel-y-Pennant in the county of Gwynedd, north-west Wales. Craig yr Aderyn has been designated as a Site of Special Scientific Interest because of the choughs and other birds that breed there.

== The hillfort ==
Craig yr Aderyn is the site of an Iron Age hillfort, showing two phases of construction. The earlier phase comprises an upper fort enclosure of approximately 0.6 hectares, measuring 100 by 55 metres; the latter, a stone-walled enclosure of approximately 1.6 hectares, measuring 119 by 170 metres. The site has been excavated three times: in 1874, 1921 and 1967. Finds from the Roman period were discovered during the 1874 dig.

== The hill ==
Craig yr Aderyn is an isolated hill in the county of Gwynedd, that juts out into the Dysynni Valley. It rises to a height of 258 metres (846 ft) above sea level on the south bank of the River Dysynni, near Llanfihangel-y-Pennant. The summit is rocky and the lower slopes are clad in tussocky grassland, heather and bracken. The two prominent faces of the hill are known locally as 'Y Palis Mawr' and 'Y Palis Bach' (English: the large stockade and the small stockade).

The site is owned by the Snowdonia National Park Authority, lies entirely within the Craig yr Aderyn SSSI, and is named after the large number of birds, such as the Chough (Pyrrhocorax pyrrhocorax), that roost and nest on the peak. It is 2 miles (3.2 km) from the Cardigan Bay coast. The hill is used by a number of species of bird for breeding. The largest inland breeding site for cormorants in Wales is here. Other birds nesting here include the barn owl, little owl, peregrine falcon, common redstart, northern wheatear and common linnet.

The ruins of Castell y Bere, built by the Princes of Gwynedd in the 13th century, are nearby.

== Cultural associations ==
The writer Susan Cooper leads her characters to "Bird Rock" in her book The Grey King from The Dark Is Rising Sequence.

The naturalist and scientist Charles Darwin visited this site as a student at Cambridge. He apparently shot seabirds here, according to recollections of a friend, John Maurice Herbert.

== See also ==
- List of hillforts in Wales
- List of Scheduled prehistoric Monuments in Gwynedd (former Merionethshire)
