= Greenwitch =

Contemporary fantasy novel

- Author: Susan Cooper
- Illustrator: Alan E. Cober
- Language: English
- Series: The Dark Is Rising Sequence
- Genre: Contemporary fantasy
- Publisher: Atheneum Press
- Publication date: April 17, 1974
- Publication place: United Kingdom
- Media type: Print (hardback & paperback)
- Pages: 131
- Preceded by: The Dark Is Rising (1973)
- Followed by: The Grey King (1975)

Greenwitch is a contemporary fantasy novel by Susan Cooper, published by Atheneum Press in 1974. It is the third entry in the five book Dark Is Rising Sequence.

== Synopsis ==
The Drew children – Simon, Jane, and Barney – return to Cornwall with their uncle Merriman Lyon. Merriman enlists them along with Will Stanton, his protégé, to recover a golden grail needed to defeat the forces of the Dark.

== Themes ==
The book draws heavily on Celtic mythology and Arthurian legend, as well as Classical mythology. The figure of the "Greenwitch", and the associated all-female festival attended by Jane, has been compared to female fertility rites in European mythology.

== Critical reception ==
The book received mixed to positive reviews from critics. Kirkus Reviews described it as "breathtakingly impressive", but criticized the conflict between good and evil as being overly abstract. Both Rebecca Fisher of Fantasy Literature and Tara L. Rivera of Common Sense Media praised Cooper's writing, but similarly criticized the interactions between Will and the Drew Children. Susan Davie of the School Library Journal described Will's presence in the novel as "superfluous."

Karen Patricia Smith has written "Greenwitch, the third book in the series, is quite different in mood from the earlier books. In this dreamlike novel set in Cornwall, magic often occurs during the hours of darkness and yet readers are not left with the feeling that experiences have been merely imagined. The Greenwitch, a figure created by village women, comes into possession of a great secret coveted by the powers of Light and Dark. Young Jane's innocence moves the creature to release the secret. Jane is an interesting figure because at first she appears to be a rather flat character who reacts according to convention. Yet as the story progresses, we learn that even those who are skilled and knowledgeable in fighting the powers of the Dark are powerless in this instance. Ironically it is Jane who is successful, not through dramatic means, but rather through communicating her compassion for the Greenwitch."
