= Jack the Giant Killer (1962 film) =

1962 film by Nathan H. Juran

- Original theatrical poster
- Directed by: Nathan H. Juran
- Written by: Orville H. Hampton; Nathan H. Juran
- Based on: Jack the Giant Killer
- Produced by: Edward Small; Robert E. Kent
- Starring: Kerwin Mathews; Judi Meredith; Torin Thatcher
- Cinematography: David S. Horsley
- Edited by: Grant Whytock
- Music by: Paul Sawtell; Bert Shefter
- Production company: Zenith Pictures
- Distributed by: United Artists
- Release dates: June 13, 1962 (Los Angeles); July 16, 1962 (United States)
- Running time: 94 minutes
- Country: United States
- Language: English

Jack the Giant Killer is a 1962 American heroic fantasy adventure film starring Kerwin Mathews in a fairy tale story about a young man who defends a princess against a sorcerer's giants and demons.

The film is loosely based on the traditional tale "Jack the Giant Killer" and features extensive use of stop-motion animation. It was directed by Nathan H. Juran and later reedited and rereleased as a musical by producer Edward Small because Columbia Pictures, which released The 7th Voyage of Sinbad, threatened to sue Small. The original print without the music was released 30 years later with no protest from Columbia Pictures, while United Artists continues to own the rights to the musical version of the film. The film reunited Mathews, Juran, Small and actor Torin Thatcher, all of whom had worked on The 7th Voyage of Sinbad.

== Plot ==
In the Duchy of Cornwall of fairy tale days, an evil sorcerer named Pendragon rules over giants, witches, hobgoblins and other dark creatures. A wizard named Herla defeats and exiles Pendragon and his followers to an uncharted island. After Herla later dies, there is no longer a defense against Pendragon, who vowed revenge.

Years later, the kingdom celebrates the crowning of Princess Elaine, the daughter of King Mark of Cornwall. Pendragon arrives disguised as a foreign lord named Elidoras and presents Elaine with a music box containing a miniature anthropomorphic dancing jester. That night, Pendragon peers into the sleeping Elaine's bed chamber and magically opens the music box, releasing the tiny jester. The creature grows into a hideous giant named Cormoran that the castle guards are powerless to stop as he abducts Elaine. Cormoran takes Elaine to Pendragon's ship, where his bumbling henchman Garna is waiting. A brave young farmer named Jack rescues Elaine and slays Cormoran. In gratitude, King Mark knights Jack and appoints him Elaine's protector. As Jack and Elaine begin to fall in love, King Mark and his chancellor are concerned over Pendragon's looming danger. The King assigns Jack to guide Princess Elaine to a convent across the sea where she will be safe. The plan is thwarted by Elaine's lady-in-waiting, Lady Constance who, bewitched by Pendragon, reveals the king's plan to him.

Pendragon sends demonic witches to intercept the ship. Amid the chaos, the ship's captain is murdered, and Elaine is captured. Jack wants the ship to follow the kidnappers, but the crew refuses and cast Jack and Peter, the captain's young son, overboard. At his castle, Pendragon bewitches Elaine into an evil witch loyal to him; Pendragon returns to Cornwall and confronts King Mark. Pendragon tells the king he has one week to renounce his throne so that Pendragon can rule with Elaine by his side. If the king refuses, Elaine will be killed. After Pendragon vanishes, King Mark realizes Lady Constance betrayed him. Standing before a mirror, she appears in witch form. King Mark smashes the mirror, freeing Lady Constance from Pendragon's spell.

At sea, a friendly Viking named Sigurd rescues Jack and Peter. He introduces them to the Imp, a leprechaun imprisoned in a glass bottle by the king of the elves for having crafted seven-league boots from his pot of gold. The Imp (who only speaks in rhyming sentences) explains that his three remaining gold coins can each grant a wish to an honest person. Sigurd has possessed the bottle without being granted any wishes, indicating he is not honest. In exchange, Jack must free the Imp once the wishes are granted. Jack agrees, and the Imp guides them to Pendragon's island.

With the first two wishes, Jack approaches Pendragon's castle and secures Elaine's release, unaware that she has been transformed. As they journey home, Elaine gives Jack a sleeping potion. When she touches the Imp's bottle, her evil nature causes it to grow hot in her hand and she reflexively casts it into the sea. Pendragon captures Jack and his companions and attempts to force Jack to reveal the Imp's whereabouts by turning Peter and Sigurd into a chimpanzee and a dog, respectively. Jack, however, does not know the Imp's location. When Jack is alone with Elaine, she reveals her witch form to him. With Peter and Sigurd's aid, Jack breaks free and smashes Elaine's mirror reflection, breaking the spell.

As the friends flee the castle, Pendragon conjures a two-headed giant. The Imp's bottle has washed ashore, and he grants Jack's final wish by summoning a sea monster that kills the giant. Pendragon transforms himself into a hideous dragon and attacks the ship. Jack kills him after a fierce battle, causing Pendragon's castle to collapse, crushing Garna and the witches. Sigurd and Peter are restored to human form. As promised, Jack frees the Imp, who uses his magical boots to return to Ireland while creating a rainbow to guide Jack and the others home to Cornwall.

== Cast ==
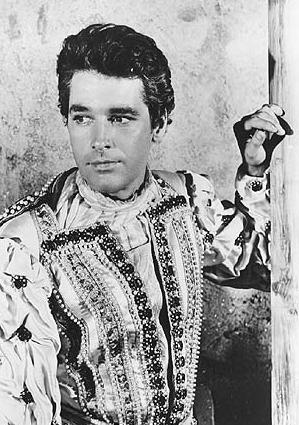
Kerwin Mathews as Jack

- Kerwin Mathews as Jack
- Judi Meredith as Princess Elaine
- Torin Thatcher as Pendragon
- Walter Burke as Garna
- Don Beddoe as Imp
- Barry Kelley as Sigurd
- Dayton Lummis as King Mark
- Anna Lee as Lady Constance
- Roger Mobley as Peter
- Robert Gist as Scottish Captain
- Tudor Owen as Chancellor
- Ken Mayer as Boatswain

== Production ==
The fairy tale had been previously filmed by Hollywood in 1917, 1924 (a short), 1931 (a cartoon) and 1952.

Edward Small announced the film in 1959, saying he had developed the special effects over two years. Filming was originally meant to be started in September 1959, in 70-mm and widescreen, but was delayed several more years.

Edward Small hired star Kerwin Mathews, director Nathan Juran and villain Torin Thatcher, all of whom had worked on The 7th Voyage of Sinbad. Juran said: "Eddie Small was smart. He wanted to make some money. He tried to get as close to Seventh Voyage as he could. He thought he could cash in by doing another picture like it. Unfortunately, he couldn't get the same special effects."

The film was shot on Catalina Island and at Goldwyn Studios, and shooting ended in August 1960. Juran divided the special effects duties between two companies: The Howard A. Anderson Company handled the photographic effects, while Project Unlimited, which had just won an Oscar for The Time Machine, supervised the stop-motion animation. Their team included animator Jim Danforth in one of his earliest jobs. Post-production took ten months, meaning the film was not released until 1962.

Film rights would be litigated years later, and a musical version of the story was later released.

== Reception ==
Response was generally positive during initial release, with praise for its similarity to the works of Ray Harryhausen.

The film continues to maintain generally positive reception from contemporary critics. On Rotten Tomatoes, it holds a 78% score based on nine reviews, with an average rating of 6.6/10. Comparisons continue to be made between the film and the Sinbad trilogy by both positive and negative reviews, both sides largely agreeing the Sinbad films have superior visual effects.

The film was also spoofed by RiffTrax.

== See also ==
- Heroic fantasy
- List of stop-motion films
