= The Dark Is Rising =

1973 children's fantasy novel by Susan Cooper

- Author: Susan Cooper
- Illustrator: Alan E. Cober
- Series: The Dark Is Rising Sequence
- Publisher: Atheneum Press
- Publication date: 1973
- Pages: 216
- Awards: Newbery Honor
- LC Class: PZ7.C7878 Dar3
- Preceded by: Over Sea, Under Stone
- Followed by: Greenwitch

The Dark Is Rising is a 1973 children's fantasy novel by Susan Cooper. The second in The Dark Is Rising Sequence, the book won a Newbery Honor. It has been described as a "folkloric tale of an English boy caught in a battle between light and dark".

== Plot ==
Will Stanton begins to have strange and magical experiences on his 11th birthday, which is at the winter solstice – a few days before Christmas. He learns that he is one of the Old Ones, an ancient group of magical people who serve as guardians and warriors for "the Light" (i.e. good), which is engaged in a centuries-long battle against the forces of "the Dark" (i.e. evil), whose power is rising. To fight back the Dark, the Old Ones need to find and reclaim four magical talismans (called "Things of Power") for the Light. The first of these is the "Circle of Signs" (a set of magical objects in the form of circles divided into four sections by a cross). Will is quested to collect all the Signs, so that the completed Circle can be used to ward off the forces of the Dark.

This book introduces Will Stanton, a protagonist in The Dark Is Rising Sequence, and features elements of British folklore that are especially associated with the Thames Valley, with Herne the Hunter making an appearance.

== Reception, awards, and impact ==
The Dark Is Rising was an American Library Association Newbery Honor Book in 1974. Based on a 2007 online poll, the U.S. National Education Association named it one of "Teachers' Top 100 Books for Children". In 2012 it was ranked number 22 among all-time children's novels in a survey published by School Library Journal, a monthly with primarily U.S. audience.

A film version, The Seeker, was released in 2007, which changed key elements of the character list and plot. Critical reception to the film was very poor.

The Dark is Rising is told over several nights from the solstice to the twelfth night of Christmas. In December 2017, nature writer Robert Mcfarlane began an online 'read along', timing the chapters with the holiday. The BBC ran a radio adaptation that began airing in 2022.
