= Roger Stanton =

Roger Stanton is a fictional character in:

- the television show 24
- the novel series The Dark Is Rising Sequence
