= Mark Fytton =

Mark Fytton was a butcher from Windsor, Berkshire. He was executed in 1536 for insulting Henry VIII and his new bride Anne Boleyn. Fytton was hanged from the Curfew Tower of Windsor Castle.

Fytton's interrogation and death were portrayed in the 1843 novel Windsor Castle by William Harrison Ainsworth. Fytton was also depicted in the play Herne the Hunter by N.B. Clarke which debuted in 1856 at the Bowery Theatre in New York City.

The site of Fytton's butchers shop was subsequently occupied by the Tower House Hotel. It was demolished in 1938.
