= Pendragon (disambiguation) =

Pendragon is a Welsh word meaning "head dragon".

Pendragon may also refer to:

== People ==
- Arthur Uther Pendragon (born John Timothy Rothwell, 5 April 1954), an English eco-campaigner, Neo-Druid leader, media personality, and self-declared reincarnation of King Arthur
- Lachlan Pendragon, (fl. 2020's) Oscar-nominated Australian animator
- The Pendragons, husband and wife team, Jonathan and Charlotte Pendragon, of illusionists

=== Legendary people ===
- Ambrosius Aurelianus or "Aurelius", son of Constantine II of Britain, called "Pendragon" in the Vulgate Cycle
- King Arthur, son of Uther
- Uther Pendragon, brother of Aurelius and father of King Arthur

== Arts, entertainment, and media ==
=== Film and television ===
- Pendragon: Sword of His Father, a 2008 Christian film
- Pendragon, the capital city of the Holy Britannian Empire in the anime television series Code Geass: Lelouch of the Rebellion

=== Games ===
- Pendragon (role-playing game)
- Saber (Fate/stay night), or Arturia Pendragon, a character in the visual novel Fate/stay night

=== Literature ===
- Pendragon: Journal of an Adventure through Time and Space, a series of ten novels by D. J. MacHale
  - Pendragon: Before the War, a spin-off series created by D. J. MacHale, written by Walter Scrolls, and Carla Jablonski
- Pendragon, one alias of the wizard Howl in the novel Howl's Moving Castle
- The Pendragon Cycle, a series of fantasy books by Stephen R. Lawhead
- The Pendragon Legend, a 1933 novel by Hungarian author Antal Szerb

=== Other arts, entertainment, and media ===
- Pendragon (band), an English neo-progressive rock band
- Knights of Pendragon, a Marvel UK comic during the early 1990s

== Enterprises ==
- Pendragon PLC, a UK car dealership chain
- Pendragon Records, a record label

== Other uses ==
- Pendragon Castle, a ruin in Cumbria, built by Uther Pendragon according to legend
- Mount Pendragon, a mountain in the South Shetland Islands of Antarctica

== See also ==
- Arthur Pendragon (disambiguation)
