= The Seeker (film) =

- Theatrical release poster
- Directed by: David L. Cunningham
- Screenplay by: John Hodge
- Based on: The Dark Is Rising by Susan Cooper
- Produced by: Marc Platt
- Starring: Alexander Ludwig; Christopher Eccleston; Frances Conroy; Ian McShane
- Cinematography: Joel Ransom
- Edited by: Geoffrey Rowland; Eric A. Sears
- Music by: Christophe Beck
- Production company: Walden Media
- Distributed by: 20th Century Fox
- Release date: October 5, 2007
- Running time: 99 minutes
- Country: United States
- Language: English
- Budget: $45 million
- Box office: $31.8 million

The Seeker (also known as The Seeker: The Dark Is Rising) is a 2007 American family drama-fantasy film, a loose film adaptation of the children's fantasy novel The Dark Is Rising (1973) by Susan Cooper. The film is directed by David L. Cunningham and stars Ian McShane, Alexander Ludwig, Frances Conroy, Gregory Smith, and Christopher Eccleston as the Rider.

The film centers on Will Stanton (Ludwig), when on his 14th birthday, he finds out that he is the last of a group of warriors – The Light – who have spent their lives fighting against evil – The Dark. Will travels through time to track down the signs that will enable him to confront the evil forces. The Dark is personified by The Rider (Eccleston).

Released on October 5, 2007, by 20th Century Fox under a then-new joint-venture partnership known as "Fox-Walden". The film was panned by critics and fans of the book series, and flopped at the box-office, only grossing $31.8 million against its $45 million budget.

== Plot ==
Will Stanton (Alexander Ludwig) is a day away from his fourteenth birthday. As Will walks home with his siblings, Miss Greythorne (Frances Conroy), the local mistress of the Manor, and her butler, Merriman Lyon (Ian McShane), invite them to a Christmas party. Later, two farmers, Dawson (James Cosmo) and Old George (Jim Piddock), arrive at the Stanton house with a large Christmas tree ordered by the family.

At the Manor Christmas party, Maggie Barnes (Amelia Warner), an attractive local girl, appears. Will becomes upset when one of his older brothers begins chatting with her. When Will leaves the Manor, he is chased by an ominous figure mounted on a white horse. As the ominous figure prepares to kill Will, Miss Greythorne, Merriman, Dawson, and Old George appear and save him. Merriman names the threatening figure as The Rider (Christopher Eccleston), who warns them all that in five days' time his power – The Dark – will rise. The four adults are Old Ones, a group of ancient warriors who serve The Light. The Old Ones take Will on a journey through time and space to a place called the Great Hall. Will is the last of the Old Ones to have been born. He is the seventh son of a seventh son whose power begins to ascend on his fourteenth birthday. (However, Will disputes this idea because he believes he is his parents' sixth son.) Will is The Seeker, who must locate six Signs whose possession will grant The Light power over The Dark. The Rider is also seeking the Signs.

Will returns home to his attic room, falls, and twists his ankle. Will's mother calls a doctor. When the doctor arrives, Will realizes that he is The Rider in disguise. The Rider demonstrates his powers on Will's ankle by alternately healing it and making it much worse before restoring it to its original injured state. He offers Will the chance to have any desire he wants fulfilled in exchange for giving him the Signs. Will discovers he has a lost twin brother named Tom, who, as a baby, mysteriously disappeared one night and was never found.

Merriman instructs Will on his powers, which include sensing the Signs, summoning superhuman strength, commanding light and fire, telekinesis, stepping through time, and the unique knowledge to decipher an ancient text in the Book of Gramarye. Will reveals the first sign, which is located within a pendant Will purchased for his sister, Gwen. Will travels through time to find the next four Signs. The Rider enlists a mysterious figure to help him obtain the Signs from Will. When Will's brother invites Maggie to their home, she reveals some of her powers to Will. Will reveals his affection for her. The Rider tricks Will's older brother Max, using his magic to partially control him. The spell over Max is finally broken when Will uses his great strength to give Max a concussion.

By the fifth day, The Dark that The Rider commands has gained tremendous power and begins to attack the village with a terrible blizzard. Will locates the fifth sign. Without the sixth sign, however, the Dark continues to rise. Maggie is revealed to be a mysterious witch who is helping the Rider in exchange for eternal youth. She is betrayed by the Rider and ages rapidly, disintegrating into a flood of water while trying to steal the Signs from Will. The Old Ones and Will seek sanctuary in the Great Hall, where the Rider cannot enter unless invited. However, the Rider's final trick (impersonating the voices of Will's relatives) gains him access to The Great Hall. The Rider reveals that he has trapped Will's twin brother Tom (whom The Rider mistook for The Seeker and kidnapped long ago) within a glass sphere. The Rider sends Will into an evil dark cloud. As he enters, Will solves the riddle of the sixth Sign: He himself is the sixth Sign. With all six Signs identified, The Rider cannot touch or harm Will.

Using his power over the dark, Will banishes both The Rider and The Dark. Will and Tom are reunited and return to their family, who are thrilled to see Tom.

== Cast ==
- Alexander Ludwig as Will Stanton. The seventh son of a seventh son, Will is the descendant of Thomas Stanton, who created the six signs. He is born with special powers that reveal themselves on his 14th birthday.
- Christopher Eccleston as The Rider, the film's primary antagonist.
- Ian McShane as Merriman Lyon, who is an Old One, a fighter for The Light and one of Will's primary instructors on how to fight the dark.
- Frances Conroy as Miss Greythorne. An Old One, a fighter for The Light and one of Will's primary instructors on how to fight the dark, Miss Greythorne is the owner of Huntercombe Manor.
- Wendy Crewson as Mary Stanton, Will's mother.
- John Benjamin Hickey as John Stanton, Will's father and a lecturer at a college in the United Kingdom.
- Gregory Smith as Max Stanton, Will's older brother who comes home from college for the holidays.
- James Cosmo as Dawson. An Old One and a fighter for The Light, Dawson is a farmer in the village.
- Jim Piddock as Old George. An Old One and a fighter for The Light, he is a farmer in the village and the best friend of Dawson.
- Drew Tyler Bell as James Stanton, Will's older brother who dates Maggie and causes Will to be jealous.
- Amelia Warner as Maggie Barnes. A pretty girl in high school who is more than what she seems.
- Edmund and Gary Entin as Robin and Paul Stanton, Will's older twin brothers.
- Emma Lockhart as Gwen Stanton, Will's younger sister.
- Jordan J. Dale as Stephen Stanton, Will's oldest brother, a member of the United States Navy.

== Production ==
=== Development ===
In July 1997, Jim Henson Pictures optioned the rights for the film adaptation of Susan Cooper's novel The Dark Is Rising. The company attached Duncan Kenworthy as producer and Andrew Klavan as screenwriter, with the film's budget estimated to be $20 million. Brian Henson, president and CEO of the company, pursued the purchase of the rights because the book was one of his favorites. In May 2005, with production never becoming active under Henson Pictures, the film adaptation rights were purchased by Walden Media, who attached Marc E. Platt to produce the project. In August 2006, Walden Media announced a joint venture with the studio 20th Century Fox to distribute Walden projects through Fox channels. The next October, director David Cunningham was hired to helm the film, then titled The Dark Is Rising. Cunningham visited Romania to prepare production for an early 2007 start to target a September 28, 2007 release date.

=== Writing ===
The Seeker: The Dark Is Rising is very loosely based on the second book in Susan Cooper's series The Dark Is Rising Sequence, titled The Dark Is Rising. Walden Media hired screenwriter John Hodge in October 2005 to adapt the story for the big screen. The mythology of Cooper's book was considered to be the plot, and Hodge was tasked to interpret the book into events that could be portrayed in a film. The story, which took place in the 1960s and 1970s in the book, was rewritten to be contemporary. Vikings were included in the film, based on a reference in the book to an old Viking boat which the protagonist discovers. Hodge rewrote the protagonist Will Stanton, portrayed by Alexander Ludwig, to be 14 instead of 11. The screenwriter chose this age, considering 11 to be more of a child's age, and 14 to be an age of transition. Stanton was also written to be American so he would be established as more of an outsider, culturally alien to the story's English setting. Hodge also wrote new subplots for Ludwig's character in the film, including sibling conflicts, a crush on a young woman (Amelia Warner), and alienation at school. The script also features the inclusion of many action sequences. The character of The Walker, portrayed by Jonathan Jackson, was also rewritten as a younger person with a new story arc about the loss of his soul. However, Jackson's character was ultimately removed from the film's theatrical cut.

=== Filming ===
Filming began on February 26, 2007, in Romania. The film was shot on several soundstages at MediaPro Studios in Buftea, Romania. Several sets built at the soundstages included an English village, the Stanton family's country home, a medieval church, and a mysterious ruin known as the Great Hall. Cinematographer Joel Ransom chose to have such sets, including the reconstruction of the 13th-century chapel that took four months to construct, built to surround the actors so he could use 360-degree camera sweeps in the locations to represent time travel sequences. Director David Cunningham chose to minimize the use of visual effects in The Seeker, only creating around 200 visual effects for the film. Instead, the director pursued practical means to carry out the effects of the film's scenes. A thousand snakes were shipped in from the Czech Republic to be dumped on the actors, real water was used to wipe out a mansion in the film, and real birds were trained to fly at the actors. Cunningham also hired Viking reenactors to assist with the Viking element in the film. The crow-like birds are consistent with the book's signature harbingers of the Dark: the rooks. One visitor to the set said that the rooks were represented by "a half-dozen trained ravens." Costume designer Vin Burnham designed a riding cloak for The Rider (Christopher Eccleston), a black get-up lined with real fur and feathers for an animalistic appearance. Burnham provided eccentric 1960s outfits for the character Miss Greythorne (Frances Conroy), with Celtic symbols incorporated into the outfits. The costume designer also wove small crystals into the outfits worn by Conroy and Ian McShane so that the outfits glisten on camera.

== Release ==
Production on The Seeker began early in 2007 to target a September 28, 2007 release date. The release date was eventually moved a week later, to October 5, 2007, during Columbus Day weekend. Up until July 27, 2007, the film was titled and marketed only as The Dark Is Rising. Fox Walden changed the film title from The Dark Is Rising to The Seeker: The Dark Is Rising. Prior to its release, the film's title was finalized to be The Seeker in the United States market. In the Canadian market, the film was released simultaneously with the U.S. distribution but under the title The Seeker: The Dark is Rising. In the United Kingdom, the film was released under the title The Dark is Rising.

The Seeker was reported to have issues leading to its release: author Susan Cooper was not happy with the adaptation of her book, the film's title was changed repeatedly, and advance screenings were canceled.

== Home media ==
- The Seeker released Tuesday, March 18, 2008, on both Blu-Ray & DVD.

== Reception ==
=== Box office ===
The Seeker was released in the United States and Canada on October 5, 2007. The film grossed $3,745,315 in 3,141 theaters in its opening weekend, ranking No. 5 at the box office in the United States and Canada. The Seeker had one of the poorest starts for a fantasy film. Box Office Prophets questioned why the film was opened in so many venues, with the cost for prints in 3,141 theaters exceeding its opening weekend gross. As of 2019, The Seeker has grossed $8.8 million, in the United States and Canada and $22.6 million in other territories for a worldwide total of $31.4 million. The Seeker had the second worst debut of all time for a film released in more than 3,000 theaters, placing behind Walden's 2006 comedy-adventure film Hoot. The Seeker then lost the most theaters in its third weekend, ahead of Hoot.

=== Critical response ===
On the review aggregator website Rotten Tomatoes, 13% of 93 critics' reviews are positive, with an average rating of 3.9/10. The website's consensus reads: "The magic of the book is lost in translation with The Seeker, due to its clumsy plot and lack of heart." Metacritic, which uses a weighted average, assigned the film a score of 38 out of 100, based on 21 critics, indicating "generally unfavorable" reviews.

Gianni Truzzi of the Seattle Post-Intelligencer opined that the film lacked the "grandiose elements" of "magic rooted in its ties to Arthurian legend and British folklore" that made the books so memorable. The Boston Globe's Ty Burr panned the film for not understanding its intended audience of book-readers, saying, "the producers have tried to gin up the story for multiplex audiences. They've succeeded in making a movie for no audience at all." And The New York Times's Jeannette Catsoulis complained that "John Hodge's screenplay is frequently dreary and overly literal... The Seeker feels passé and lacks a charismatic lead."

Chicago Tribune's Kelley L. Carter said that, "At its best, The Seeker is a pretty vivid fantasy book come-to-life" and found the lead character of Will Stanton to have been "played convincingly." Baltimore Sun's Michael Sragow found that The Seeker had "a lot going for it, including wonderful sets and locations...that create a heightened-reality English hamlet".

The New York Times's Catsoulis mentioned, "Too bad Daniel Radcliffe is an only child." The Chicago Tribune's Carter wrote, "Harry Potter, meet your not-so-much cousin... had it not been for the Potter series, the bar for children’s fantasy film wouldn't be quite as high, and The Seeker falls short of the high-riding, high-quality material delivered in the Harry Potter film series." The New York Post's Smith went so far as to title his review "Bad Harry Day" and to joke that "In today's England, a teenage boy is instructed by grown-up mentors in the use of magical powers while a dark lord who comes in many formats promises an epic battle. The movie is based on a 1973 book by Susan Cooper, who must be trembling in fear of being sued for ripping off J.K. Rowling's ideas and publishing them 20 years in advance." The Boston Globe's Burr described the parallels more clearly, saying that "against him is a metrosexual meanie called The Rider (Christopher Eccleston), sort of a He Who Can Be Named. In general, Cooper's story line has been Potterized to little avail: Will's family is as large as the Weasleys, as unloving as the Dursleys, and no fun whatsoever."

== Soundtrack ==
- "The Sweetest Disguise" – Performed by The Sunday Drivers
- "Jingle Bells" – Performed by The CSSR State Philharmonic
- "We Wish You a Merry Christmas" – Performed by The CSSR State Philharmonic
- "Deck the Halls" – Performed by Nicolaus Esterházy Sinfonia
- "Joy to the World" – Lyrics by Issac Watts, music attrib. George Frideric Handel (no performer credited)
- "The Seeker" – Performed by Big Linda
