= Pendragon =

Name in Arthurian literature

Pendragon, composed of Welsh pen, 'head, chief, top' and dragon, 'dragon; warriors'; borrowed from the Greco-Latin plural dracōnēs, 'dragons', is a Middle Welsh epithet meaning 'chief of warriors'. It is the epithet of Uther, father of King Arthur in the Matter of Britain in medieval and modern era and occasionally applied to historical Welsh heroes in medieval Welsh literature such as Rhodri ab Owain Gwynedd.

In the Historia Regum Britanniae, one of the earliest texts of the Matter of Britain, only Uther is given the surname Pendragon, which is explained by the author Geoffrey of Monmouth as literally meaning dragon's head.

In the prose version of Robert de Boron's Merlin, the name of Uther's elder brother Ambrosius Aurelianus is given as Pendragon, while Uter (Uther) changes his name after his brother's death to Uterpendragon.

== Modern use ==
The use of "Pendragon" to refer to Arthur, rather than to Uther or his brother, is of much more recent vintage. In literature, one of its earliest uses to refer to Arthur is in Alfred, Lord Tennyson's poem "Lancelot and Elaine", where, however, it appears as Arthur's title rather than his surname.

In C. S. Lewis's 1945 novel That Hideous Strength, the Pendragon leads a national moral struggle through the centuries; bearers of the title include Cassibelaun, Uther, Arthur, and Elwin Ransom.

Mark Twain in A Connecticut Yankee in King Arthur's Court makes various satirical and scathing remarks about "The Pendragon Dynasty" which are in fact aimed at ridiculing much later British dynasties. The story of The Pendragon Legend by Antal Szerb revolves around a Welsh noble family called Pendragon.

The final book in Susan Cooper's The Dark Is Rising sequence, Silver on the Tree, is set in Wales. The story includes a character named Bran who is the son of King Arthur brought forward in time by Guinevere. Bran is referred to as The Pendragon and uses this title himself. His crystal sword, a birthright made for King Arthur, is called Pendragon's Sword among other names.

A 2008 film titled Pendragon: Sword of His Father about a young Artos (Arthur) Pendragon.

== See also ==
- Pendragon Castle
