= The Once and Future King (disambiguation) =

The Once and Future King is a collection of fantasy novels

The Once and Future King may also refer to:

- King Arthur, the character the book title is a reference to
- Once and Future King Part I, a 2003 album by Gary Hughes
- Once and Future King Part II, a 2003 album by Gary Hughes
- "The Once and Future King" (The Twilight Zone), a 1986 episode of the television series The Twilight Zone (1985-1989)
- "The Once and Future King", a B-side of the 2007 single "Flux" by Bloc Party
- "Once and Future King", a Marvel Comics storyline featuring characters Falcon and Erik Killmonger
- The Once and Future King: The Rise of Crown Government in America, a 2015 book by F.H. Buckley
- Once & Future King, a 1994 supplement for the role-playing game Amazing Engine

== See also ==
- "The Once and Future Duck", a comic book story by Don Rosa
- "The Once and Future Duck", an episode of the television series Duckman, see List of Duckman episodes
- Once and future king of DV, a nickname for film director Todd Verow
- King Arthur (disambiguation)
