= Am Fear Liath Mòr =

Part of Scottish folklore

In Scottish folklore, Am Fear Liath Mòr (Scottish Gaelic for 'Big Grey Man'; pronounced [əm ˈfɛɾ ʎiə ˈmoːɾ]; (also known as the Big Grey Man of Ben Macdui or simply the Greyman) is the name for a presence or cryptid which is said to haunt the summit and passes of Ben Macdui, the highest peak of the Cairngorms and the second highest peak in the British Isles after Ben Nevis.

== Description ==
Although there have been many purported encounters with the Big Grey Man, few eyewitnesses report to have actually seen the creature. It is said to be very thin and over ten feet (three metres) tall, with dark skin and hair, long arms, and broad shoulders. Most often, the creature remains unseen in the fog of the mountain, with encounters limited to the sound of crunching gravel as it walks behind climbers and a general feeling of unease around the mountain. Tangible evidence of its existence is limited to a few photographs of unusual footprints, so the majority relies on the credibility of eyewitness encounters.

The figure has many similarities with the Brenin Llwyd (English: Grey King) of Welsh mythology, this figure is also semi-corporeal, silent and uses the mists as a cloak to prey on unwary travellers. Unlike the Am Fear Liath, Brenin Llwyd is found in mountainous locations across Wales, and is particularly noted to prey on children.

== Sightings ==
=== Collie ===
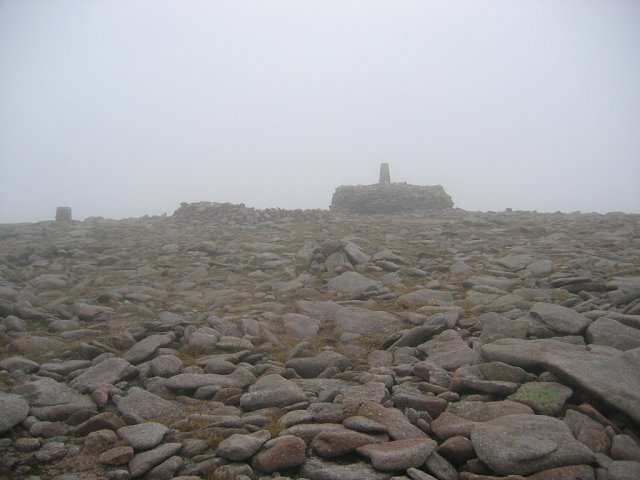
The summit of Ben Macdui

In 1925, J. Norman Collie gave the first recorded account of a Grey Man encounter. A noted hiker, professor, and member of the Royal Geographical Society, Collie recounted a terrifying experience he had as he hiked alone near the summit of Ben Macdui years earlier in 1891.

"I was returning from the cairn on the summit in a mist when I began to think I heard something else than merely the noise of my own footsteps. Every few steps I took I heard a crunch, and then another crunch, as if someone was walking after me but taking steps three or four times the length of my own. I said to myself, this is all nonsense. I listened and heard it again but could see nothing in the mist. As I walked on and the eerie crunch, crunch sounded behind me, I was seized with terror and took to my heels, staggering blindly among the boulders for four or five miles nearly down to Rothiemurchus Forest. Whatever you make of it, I do not know, but there is something very queer about the top of Ben Macdui and I will not go back there again."

Collie's account was reported in the local press, which started a debate between sceptics and believers within the community. Other climbers came forward with their own encounters, which they had previously been afraid to share. One climber, Hugh D. Welsh, said that he hiked the summit with his brother in 1904, where throughout the day and night they heard "slurring footsteps, as if someone was walking through water-saturated gravel." Both felt "frequently conscious of something near us, an eerie sense of apprehension."

=== Densham ===
In 1945, Pete Densham was participating in rescue work in the Cairngorm mountains during World War II. One day, he reported hearing strange noises, mist closing in on his location, and increasing pressure around his neck. He fled before seeing anything concrete. A friend of his, climber Richard Frere, wrote about his sense of "a Presence, utterly abstract but intensely real" on the mountain and heard "an intensely high singing note" a few years later in 1948. Frere also presented the encounter of another mutual friend, who wished to remain anonymous, while he camped on Ben Macdui. He reported waking up feeling an inescapable feeling of dread, and looked out of his tent to see a large figure with dark hair standing in front of the moon in silhouette.

=== Tewnion ===
In 1958, naturalist and mountaineer Alexander Tewnion published an article in The Scots magazine about an encounter with the Grey Man in 1943.

"I spent a 10-day leave climbing alone in the Cairngorms. One afternoon, just as I reached the summit cairn of Ben MacDhui, mist swirled across the Lairig Ghru and enveloped the mountain. The atmosphere became dark and oppressive, a fierce, bitter wind whisked among the boulders, and... an odd sound echoed through the mist – a loud footstep, it seemed. Then another, and another... A strange shape loomed up, receded, came charging at me! Without hesitation I whipped out the revolver and fired three times at the figure. When it still came on I turned and hared down the path, reaching Glen Derry in a time that I have never bettered. You may ask was it really the Fear Laith Mhor? Frankly, I think it was.

=== Rennie ===
No photographs of the Big Grey Man have ever been taken. Photographer John A. Rennie supposedly found a series of footprints in Spey Valley, measuring 19 inches (48 centimetres) long and 14 inches (36 centimetres) wide. These were published in a book, but he later discovered that they were a natural phenomenon caused by rainfall eroding the snow.

=== Hogg ===
The poet and author James Hogg encountered a Brocken spectre on Ben Macdui as far back as 1791, describing "a giant blackamoor, at least thirty feet high, and equally proportioned, and very near me. I was actually struck powerless with astonishment and terror." Hogg's terror subsided when he observed the figure making the same gestures as his own, realizing that it was merely his own shadow when he removed his hat. This experience later inspired an iconic scene in his later novel Confessions of a Justified Sinner, which has a character on a misty morning at Arthur's Seat see when facing the east an approaching demonic, shadowy apparaiton he describes as "blown-up, dialated frame of embodied air..." and "as it neared, the dimensions of its form lesened, still continuing, however, far above the natural size. " Within the story, this phenomenon was written off as the Brocken Spectre cast by an approaching person from the west (which would at this time of day with the sun in the east be impossible), indirectly citing Ben Macdui as "a mountain in Aberdeenshire, [where] he would show him a giant spirit of the same dimensions, at any morning at the rising of the sun, provided he shone on that spot. British mountaineer Frank Smythe stated he had observed his shadow cast as a Brocken spectre across the mist on Ben Macdui as well.

== Explanations ==
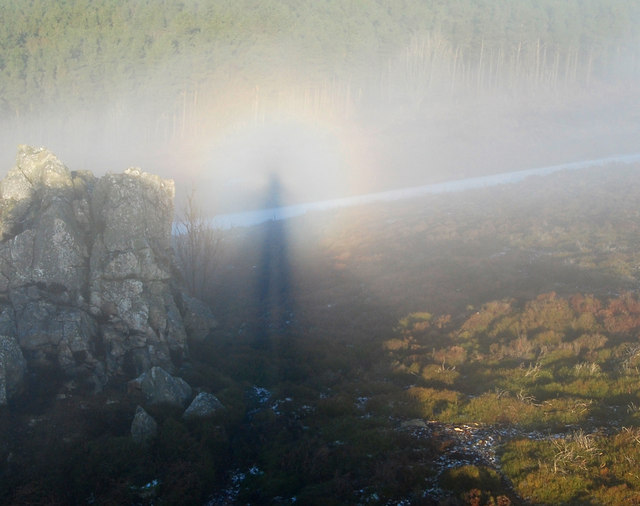
Brocken Spectre phenomenon

Illusions, hallucinations or misinterpretation of natural stimulus brought on by exhaustion or isolation have been proposed by psychologists. Infrasound, which can be generated by wind, can cause feelings of uneasiness and anxiety and is possibly connected to paranormal sightings.

An optical illusion known as the Brocken spectre is a plausible explanation for some visual elements of the Big Grey Man legend. A Brocken spectre, or "mountain spectre," can occur in certain atmospheric conditions when the sun is at a particular angle. The subject's shadow can be cast onto a cloud bank around them, creating the illusion of a large shadowy humanoid figure.

== See also ==
- Brenin Llwyd
- Wild man
- Lubber fiend
