= Howard A. Anderson Jr. =

American visual effects artist (1920-2015)

- Born: March 31, 1920; Los Angeles, California
- Died: September 27, 2015 (aged 95); California
- Education: University of California, Los Angeles
- Parent(s): Minerva Ayling and Howard Alvin Anderson

Howard Alvin Anderson Jr. ASC (March 31, 1920 – September 27, 2015), was an American visual effects artist and cinematographer specializing in photographic effects, titles and opticals. A pioneer of visual effects, he was one of the effects artists on Star Trek: The Original Series and created the title sequences for hundreds of the most popular television series between the early 1950s and late 1980s, including I Love Lucy, The Untouchables, The Brady Bunch, Happy Days, Kung Fu, and Cheers. He also provided titles and effects on such films as Some Like It Hot, The Apartment, Jack the Giant Killer, Tobruk, Blazing Saddles, and Superman.

== Early life and career ==
Anderson was born in Los Angeles, California, on March 31, 1920, the son of Minerva Ayling and Howard Alvin Anderson. He grew up in Culver City, California, where his younger brother, Darrell Addison Anderson, was born in 1921. His father was a Hollywood special effects photographer who pioneered the emerging art of visual effects when he created the lightning, flood and storm effects for Cecil B. DeMille's epic silent film The King of Kings, released in 1927. That year, he founded the Howard Anderson Special Photographic Effects Company, where Anderson Jr. began working part-time in the 1930s, still in his pre-teens.

By age 10, Anderson had become what he later called a "Navy enthusiast," and he joined the U.S. Navy Reserve while in high school. He began attending Alexander Hamilton High School in 1934 and transferred to Hollywood High School the following year, graduating in 1938. He enrolled in UCLA, where he studied mathematics and joined the university's Naval Reserve Officers Training Corps program. He found work shooting industrial films for the Douglas Aircraft Company, including a documentary on the construction of the Douglas XB-19, and the company's public-relations film We Give Them Wings. In 1943, he began serving in the U.S. Navy, primarily as a still photographer and a cameraman on training films.

== Career ==
=== Television ===
After returning from naval service in 1946, Anderson began working at his father's company with his father and brother. Some of the early shows he worked on were The George Burns and Gracie Allen Show, Dragnet, The Adventures of Ozzie & Harriet, and Hopalong Cassidy. In 1954, the Anderson brothers took over the company from their father.

During the 1950s and '60s, Anderson helped create title sequences and other visual elements for many of the programs made by Desi Arnaz and Lucille Ball's Desilu Productions, including I Love Lucy, The Lucy Show, The Untouchables, Mission: Impossible, and Star Trek. According to an interview of Howard by The Television Academy Foundation, Anderson’s studio handled the optical photography and post-production of the ‘heart on satin’ titles for syndicated rebroadcasts of I Love Lucy. The original heart design and typography were created by Verdun Philip Cook, an African American typographer and animator who collaborated with Desilu Productions during the show’s original run.

On Star Trek; in addition to creating the show's title sequence, he and his brother were one of four visual effects teams on the series. They began working with Star Trek creator Gene Roddenberry in 1964 to develop effects for the show's first pilot, "The Cage", and continued on the series throughout its three seasons. Among the iconic visuals they created were the star fields through which the USS Enterprise cruised, the photographic method for the illusion of people being transported or "beamed" to and from the ship, and matte paintings and other effects for the various alien worlds seen in the show.

Anderson helped create the title sequences for The Brady Bunch, which featured the show's nine cast members in a tic-tac-toe board—a sequence which Anderson himself shot. He also helped create the title sequences for The Addams Family, The Andy Griffith Show, The Beverly Hillbillies, Daniel Boone, The Dick Van Dyke Show, The Fugitive, Get Smart, I Spy, The Invaders, The Mod Squad, My Favorite Martian, My Three Sons, The Outer Limits, That Girl, The Twilight Zone, and many other shows.

During the 1970s, he was behind the opening titles of shows such as Happy Days, including the shot of the jukebox record and providing the neon sign displaying the show's title; and Kung Fu, of which he was particularly proud, calling it his "claim to fame." He also created titles for Barnaby Jones, Charlie's Angels, Little House on the Prairie, Love American Style, The Love Boat, The Waltons, and Wonder Woman, among many others. In the 1980s he created titles for shows including Murder, She Wrote, The A-Team, Cheers and Dynasty.

=== Film ===
Anderson created main titles and visual effects for over 100 films throughout his career, with some of his earliest being Prehistoric Women and Phantom from Space. He collaborated with fellow special effects artist Milt Rice on the science fiction thriller Invasion of the Body Snatchers and on several Billy Wilder comedies, including Some Like It Hot and The Apartment, with Anderson creating the titles for the latter two films. Anderson also shot the inserts for the Americanized version of Godzilla Raids Again, which was released in 1959 as Gigantis the Fire Monster. He also did effects work on such films as George Pal's The Time Machine, J. Lee Thompson's Taras Bulba, and Nathan H. Juran's Jack the Giant Killer.

The highlight of Anderson's film work was Arthur Hiller's war film Tobruk, for which Anderson and Albert Whitlock were nominated for the Academy Award for Best Visual Effects at the 40th Academy Awards. He later did uncredited work on such films as Escape from the Planet of the Apes, Blazing Saddles, Gray Lady Down, Heaven Can Wait, Superman, and Annie.

== Retirement and death ==
Anderson retired from active effects work in 1990, though he continued to run the Howard Anderson Company until 1994.

In 2004 he received the President's Award for lifetime achievement from the American Society of Cinematographers, of which he had been a member since 1962. In 2007 he received a Lifetime Achievement Award from the Academy of Television Arts & Sciences, the organization behind the Emmy Awards.

Anderson died in California on September 27, 2015. He was 95.
