= Arthur King =

Arthur King may refer to:

- Arthur Henry King (1910–2000), British poet, writer and academic
- Arthur Scott King (1876–1957), American physicist and astrophysicist
- Arthur King (footballer) (1887–?), Scottish footballer
- Arthur King (boxer) (1927–2011), Canadian boxer of the 1940s and 1950s
- An alias of DC Comics supervillain Merlyn

== See also ==
- King Arthur (disambiguation)
