= Over Sea, Under Stone =

1965 children's book by Susan Cooper

Over sea, Under stone
- Gill cover of first edition
- Author: Susan Cooper
- Illustrator: Margery Gill
- Language: English
- Series: The Dark Is Rising
- Genre: Children's fantasy, mystery novel
- Published: May 1965 (Jonathan Cape)
- Publication place: United Kingdom
- Media type: Print (hardcover & paperback)
- Pages: 252 (first ed., hard)
- OCLC: 10705690
- LC Class: PZ7.C7878 Ov
- Followed by: The Dark Is Rising

Over Sea, Under Stone is a contemporary fantasy novel written for children by the English author Susan Cooper, first published in London by Jonathan Cape in 1965. Cooper wrote four sequels about ten years later, making it the first volume in a series usually called The Dark Is Rising Sequence (1965 to 1977). In contrast to the rest of the series, it is more a mystery, with traditional fantasy elements mainly the subject of hints later in the narrative. Thus it may ease readers into the fantasy genre.

== Plot ==
Over Sea, Under Stone features the Drew children, Simon, Jane, and Barney, on holiday with their parents and Merriman Lyon, an old family friend, usually referred to by the children as their great-uncle. The Drew family meets him in the fictional fishing village of Trewissick on the southern coast of Cornwall. In the attic of the big Grey House they are renting from Merriman's friend Captain Toms, the children find an old manuscript. They recognise a drawing of the local coastline that may be a kind of map, with almost illegible text, but Barney realises that the map refers to King Arthur and his knights. The children decide to keep the discovery to themselves.

The family is visited at the Grey House by a very friendly Mr. Withers and his sister Polly, who invite them to go fishing on their yacht. The boys are thrilled, but Jane feels suspicious and declines to join them. While Jane is alone in the Grey House, she finds a guidebook to Trewissick, written by the local vicar, in an old trunk. She realises that the map in the guidebook is similar to the secret map, but also different somehow, so she decides to visit the vicar. The man at the vicarage is not the writer of the guidebook, but he offers to help Jane. He asks some probing questions that arouse Jane's suspicions, and she decides to return home.

Soon, the house is burgled, with attention paid only to the bookshelves and the wall hangings, and the children guess that someone else knows of and seeks the manuscript. The children decide that it is time to confide in Great-Uncle Merry. Up on the headland, they show him the map, and he tells them that it is a copy of an even older map that shows the way to a hidden treasure and that the children are now in great danger. He explains that some British artefact may have been hidden here long ago, and confirms that they will have dangerous grown-up rivals in their pursuit. So begins their quest for the Grail on behalf of the Light, which they have to achieve while being harried by Mr. Withers and his sister, who are agents of the Dark, desperate to stop them at any cost.

Mother usually paints outdoors, and father goes boating, or both travel out of town. Meanwhile, the children investigate the meaning of the map, encouraged, yet warned and sometimes "guarded", by Great Uncle Merry. They learn to read the diagram and work out the clues on the map, but they must work outside, where each child has a nasty encounter with the Dark and their progress is easy to observe. While looking for the first clue, Simon is chased by Mr. Hastings and Bill Hoover Jr. After the second clue leads them to the headland at night, Simon, Jane, and Great-Uncle Merry are ambushed and almost caught by followers of the Dark. Merriman is misdirected out of town, but the children anxiously follow their ancient guide "over sea and under stone" without him. Barney is kidnapped by Mr. Withers and his sister, Polly, and must be rescued. The children eventually follow the clues to a cave beneath the headland and discover the Grail. Unfortunately, they lose an important metal case that was lodged inside the Grail, which contained a coded manuscript that is the key to deciphering the markings on the outside of the Grail.

The children present the Grail to the British Museum and are given a cheque for it. The Grail is an object of debate among the scholars there because of the unknown markings. Barney begins to suspect something, reciting in his mind the name of the great-uncle Merry and eventually finding a link to Merlin.

== Characters ==
- Simon Drew: Eldest of three Drew children.
- Jane Drew: The middle Drew sibling.
- Barnabas "Barney" Drew: The youngest of the siblings.
- Merriman "Gumerry" Lyon (Great-Uncle Merry): An old friend of the Drew children's maternal grandfather and their mentor.
- Captain Toms: Friend of Merriman; owner of the Grey House and Rufus.
- Rufus: Captain Toms' dog. Helps the Drew children avoid danger and find the Grail.
- Mr. Hastings: Agent of The Dark. He leads the Dark members searching for the Grail.
- Mr. Withers and his sister Polly: Over-friendly tourists who invite the Drews on their yacht; Agents of The Dark.
- Mrs. Palk: Motherly Cornish housekeeper of the Grey House. Aunt and accomplice to Bill.
- Bill Hoover Jr.: Nephew to the housekeeper; Working for the Withers.
- Father: Simon, Jane, and Barney's Father.
- Mother (Ellen): Simon, Jane, and Barney's Mother.

== Origins ==
Beside the Matter of Britain, the novel is rooted in Susan Cooper's childhood. Trewissick is based directly on the actual village of Mevagissey, which she frequented on her own holidays. The (former) vicarage, where Jane Drew has the first nasty encounter with Mr. Hastings, is based on the (former) vicarage Mevagissey House.

Over Sea, Under Stone came as a response to a contest designed to honour the memory of E. Nesbit. Joel Chaston writes that the contest was "offered by E. Nesbit's publisher, Ernest Benn, for family-adventure stories like those written by Nesbit. Cooper did not enter the contest but eventually completed the manuscript. After it was turned down by twenty or more publishers, she sent it to a friend of a friend who was reading manuscripts for Jonathan Cape, who published it in 1965."

== Literary significance and criticism ==
Successful soon after publication, the novel was well received by the literary world.

Among narratives intended for children it features fairly sophisticated use of English, with an extensive vocabulary and complex sentence structures.

Joel Chaston writes, "Reviewers noted that the book begins as a mystery-adventure story and becomes a sort of morality tale full of mysticism and elements of Arthurian legend. Because it later became a part of a series, Over Sea, Under Stone has continued to gain new readers. In a 1976 Horn Book essay, "A Second Look: Over Sea, Under Stone", Dwight Dudley Carlson argues that Cooper's superb abilities as a storyteller, the novel's clear delineation of good and evil, and the believability of the Drew children have contributed to its lasting success with young readers."

== Publication history ==
- 1965, UK, Jonathan Cape (ISBN NA), May 1965, hardcover (first edition)
- 1966, US, Harcourt, Brace & World (ISBN NA), 1966, hard (first US ed.)
- 1968, UK, Puffin (ISBN 0-14-03-0362-6), 1968, paperback
- 1989, US, Simon Pulse (ISBN 0020427859), 30 April 1989, paper
- 1989, US, First Scholastic, November 1989, paper

== TV adaptation ==
In 1969, the BBC's Jackanory series featured a 5-part adaptation of Over Sea, Under Stone. David Wood appeared as the storyteller, while dramatised sequences included Graham Crowden as Uncle Merry and Colin Jeavons as The Black Vicar. No episodes survive in the BBC archives.

== Radio adaptation ==
In 1995 Armada Productions adapted Over Sea, Under Stone for BBC Radio 4 as part of its Children's Radio 4 strand, and followed in 1997 with an adaptation of its sequel The Dark Is Rising (both under their original titles). Each comprised four half-hour episodes with few changes from the book. Ronald Pickup (familiar to many as the voice of Aslan in the BBC Narnia TV adaptations) voiced Merriman Lyon while Struan Rodger portrayed Mr. Hastings, Mr. Mitothin, and The Rider.

Over Sea, Under Stone was repeated once in 1997 a few months before The Dark Is Rising and again in November 2016 by BBC Radio 4 Extra. It has never been made commercially available.
