= Arthur Pendragon (disambiguation) =

Arthur Pendragon is another name for King Arthur, a legendary British leader.

Arthur Pendragon may also refer to:

- Arthur Uther Pendragon (born 1954), British activist and self-declared reincarnation of King Arthur
- Arthur Pendragon (Merlin), a character in the TV series Merlin
- Saber (Fate/stay night), or Artoria Pendragon, a character based on King Arthur in the Japanese visual novel Fate/stay night
- Sir Arthur Pendragon, a character in video games produced by Ultimate Play the Game
- Arthur Pendragon (Shrek), a character in the Shrek films

== See also ==
- King Arthur (disambiguation)
- Pendragon (disambiguation)
