= King Arthur (disambiguation) =

King Arthur is a legendary king of the Britons.

- See also Historicity of King Arthur

King Arthur may also refer to:

== Fiction and literature ==
- Le Morte d'Arthur, 15th-century work of Sir Thomas Malory
- King Arthur: An Heroick Poem in Twelve Books, a 1697 poem by Richard Blackmore

== Film and television ==
- The Sword in the Stone (1963), a Disney character voiced by Rickie Sorensen, Richard Reitherman, and Robert Reitherman
- King Arthur: Legend of the Sword, a 2017 film by Guy Ritchie
- King Arthur (2004 film), a film by Antoine Fuqua
- King Arthur (TV series), a 1979 Japanese TV series

== Games ==
- King Arthur (video game), a 2004 game based on the film
- King Arthur: The Role-Playing Wargame, a 2009 role-playing game
- King Arthur (board wargame), a 1979 game

== Music ==
- King Arthur (opera), a 1691 opera by John Dryden and Henry Purcell
- King Arthur, a 1937 composition by Benjamin Britten
- "King Arthur", or "Arthur", a 1975 recording by Rick Wakeman from The Myths and Legends of King Arthur and the Knights of the Round Table
- "King Arthur", a 1986 song by Valerie Dore
- "King Arthur", a 1994 song from Care of My Soul Vol. 1 by Mark Spiro

== Other uses ==
- King Arthur (tree), a giant sequoia in Sequoia National Park, California, US
- King Arthur Baking, an American milling company founded in 1790
- King Arthur class, or LSWR N15 class, a class of steam locomotives named after Arthurian characters
- Arthur I, Duke of Brittany (1187–c. 1203), the designated heir to the English throne, usurped by his uncle
- Arthur, Prince of Wales (1486–1502), would have become "King Arthur of England" if he had not died before his father

== See also ==
- Arthur King (disambiguation)
- Arthur Pendragon (disambiguation)
- Arthur (disambiguation)
- The Once and Future King (disambiguation)
