= Pendragon: Sword of His Father =

- Directed by: Chad Burns
- Starring: Aaron Burns; Nick Burns; Marilyn Burns; Erik Dewar; Andy Burns
- Cinematography: Ethan Ledden
- Edited by: Nicholas Burns
- Music by: Aaron Burns; Marilyn Burns
- Production company: Burns Family Studios
- Release date: November 25, 2008
- Running time: 111 minutes
- Country: United States
- Language: English

Pendragon: Sword of His Father is a 2008 Christian historical fiction film based on the Arthurian legend directed by Chad Burns. It was filmed in five U.S. states, and was released on November 25, 2008. The film won "Best Family Picture" and two other awards at the 2009 Bare Bones International Film Festival, and will also be featured at the SENE Film, Music & Arts Festival.

The film is set within Roman Britain in the year 411, one year following the withdrawal of the Roman legions from the province. The young Artos (King Arthur) is enslaved in a Saxon raid on his village, but he escapes and is nursed back to health by the Roman outcast Lailoken. Artos subsequently rises through the ranks in the army of the new king Ambrosius. When Ambrosius is assassinated, Artos is framed for regicide.

== Plot ==
The story is set in 411 AD, one year after the legions of Rome withdrew from the Isle of Britannia. Pendragon is the story of young Artos who is raised to believe that God has a purpose for his life. After a tragic event resulting in the burning of his village by a Saxon attack, the death of his father, and the disappearance of his little sister Adria, he is taken into slavery by the Saxons, where Artos begins to question his God.

Artos soon manages to escape from the Saxons and is nursed back to health by a Roman outcast named Lailoken. When he fully recovers, Artos travels to a Celtic fortress hidden in the Welsh mountains where he becomes a great warrior under King Ambrosius. Advancing through the military ranks, Artos begins to understand that his father's vision was not based on the strength of man, but on the plan of God.

Artos' success causes one of Ambrosius's men, his pagan Captain of the Guard Caydern, to become jealous of Artos's rapid rise to power in the military. Using a secret guard that he created several years ago, Caydern is able to murder Ambrosius, and to frame the assassination on Artos. While on trial, Artos escapes from the court and elude Caydern's elite guard. Further events force Artos to decide between following God's plan unto certain death or abandoning God to save himself.

== Cast ==
- Clark Mcghee as lead barbarian
- Aaron Burns as Artos Pendragon
- Nick Burns as Caydern - Ambrosius' pagan captain of the guard, ruthless and jealous of Artos' rise in rank and favor
- Marilyn Burns as Wenneveria - The daughter of Ambrosius
- Erik Dewar as Brotus
- Andy Burns as Ambrosius
- Chad Burns as Lailoken
- Raymond Burns as Justinian Pendragon - Father of Artos and a garrison commander in the east of Britannia; killed during the initial Saxon invasion.
- Rebekah Wixom as Adria - Artos' sister
- David Hartmond as Pendragon
