= Alan E. Cober =

American illustrator

- Born: May 18, 1935; New York City, United States
- Died: January 17, 1998 (aged 62); Sarasota, Florida
- Education: University of Vermont, Burlington, Vermont; School of Visual Arts, New York City
- Known for: Illustration
- Awards: Hamilton King Award, 1969; Society of Illustrators Hall of Fame, 2011

Alan E. Cober (May 18, 1935 – January 17, 1998), born in New York City was an American illustrator. His artwork appeared in The New York Times, Life, Time and numerous other publications. Cober was inducted into the Illustration Hall of Fame in 2011, thirteen years after his death in 1998. Cober was frequently cited as one of the most innovative illustrators America has ever produced.

== Early life and education ==
Cober was born in New York City, grew up in the Bronx and attended public schools. In 1952 he attended a preparatory school in Riverdale, the Barnard School for Boys. His father, Sol Walter Cohen was a criminal lawyer for 48 years until his death in 1974. The young artist was close to his father and through him, gained firsthand knowledge of courtrooms, police work and the detention of criminals. This experience would later inform his own views and subsequent art on perceived social inequities. His mother, Molly, was president of the Sarah Starkman League for Retarded Children. During his teenage years, Cober would accompany her as she cared for many children in her care.

Cober would initially attend the University of Vermont, but later graduated in 1966 from the School of Visual Arts in New York City where the young artist would learn the importance of drawing and seeing. Cober was drafted into the Army in April 1958, going through basic training at Fort Dix, he spent the remaining two years of service teaching officers and heading the graphics department at the Special Warfare School, at Fort Bragg in North Carolina. Cober would spend those two years drawing and learning and that is where he felt he received his real education.

== Career ==
Cober was one of a small group of American illustrators who initially brought aspects of modern art into commercial art. His magazine illustrations rejected the existing top-down approach of art direction and embraced a far more expressive and symbolic approach to the subject matter. He did not mimic a passage of text, as was the convention at the time in illustration, but instead embraced artistic interpretation. He was one of a few illustrators during the 1960s to make gritty graphic commentary flourish in the rigid world of American illustration. The credit for works such as Cober's being published goes to art directors who were to bring innovative illustrations to print, notably among them Cipe Pineles at Seventeen, Richard Gangel at Sports Illustrated, and Henry Wolf at Esquire.

Cober would be commissioned for work by publications such as LIFE, LOOK, Rolling Stone, Esquire, Newsweek, Science Digest, The Atlantic, The New York Times and covers for Time magazine. His corporate clients included Exxon, CBS, American Airlines, IBM, General Electric, IT and Texaco.

In addition to illustration, his mediums included painting, printmaking and clay and ceramic sculpture.

=== Visual journalism ===
Early in his career, Cober traveled the United States working on a commission received from the National Park Service. His drawings were made on site at Mount Rushmore, Thomas Jefferson's home Monticello, the Battle of Gettysburg and Colonial Williamsburg. Cober documented the locations by drawing in his sketchbook. As he would often do throughout his career, each drawing would document his journalistic views and personal feelings that he was experiencing at the given moment.

On assignment with The New York Times, Cober was provided access to the Willowbrook mental health facility in Staten Island. The assignment was to create two drawings for publication. Cober created fifty, many of which would end up being published in his 1975 book, The Forgotten Society which documented his reaction to conditions for the mentally handicapped, prisoners and the aged in New York state with 92 drawings and was published by Dover Press and featured in People magazine. The book would be reprinted in numerous editions up until 2012 with an introduction by his daughter, Leslie Cober-Gentry.

When Cober decided he wanted to do a series of work on circus life, he got in touch with Kenneth Feld, owner of Barnum and Bailey Circus. Agreeable to the idea of Cober drawing the circus, Feld provided him with the credentials necessary to enter backstage. When the circus came to Madison Square Garden, Cober came in to create portraits of the characters and performers he took an interest in. He would become friends with many of the performers as they sat for portraits between their acts. Lou Jacobs was a favorite model of Cober's. Other popular performers who modeled for Cober were Mishu, billed as the "smallest man on earth", Philippe Petit, the high-wire artist who would later become famous for his highwire walk between the Twin Towers of the World Trade Center in 1974, as well as lion trainer, Gunther Gebel-Williams. Cober drew their living conditions in their trailers, their families and pets, depicting a culture unknown to the audience who could only appreciate the circus from the bleachers.

In 1982, the Smithsonian Institution commissioned Cober to create a mural in celebration of George Washington's 250th birthday.

Among his many other notable journalistic assignments were his coverage of the shuttle liftoffs from Cape Canaveral for NASA, the 1980 presidential campaign of Jimmy Carter for TIME, and in 1987 Cober traveled on the press plane to cover Pope John Paul's visit to the United States for Rolling Stone.

His fascination with mental as well as physical decay and a compassion for social issues formed the foundation of his artistic themes throughout his career. Cober's aim as a visual journalist (which is what he called himself) was to effect change by graphically exposing what he determined as critically important to interpret at the time.

== Museum exhibitions ==
In 1992, the Georgia Museum of Art displayed Cober's work in an exhibition titled Alan E. Cober: suite Georgia. The exhibition title refers to prints Cober completed during 1991 as the Lamar Dodd Professorial Chair at the University Of Georgia. The exhibition included etchings made of such folk artists as Howard Finster, R.A. Miller, Reverend John D. Ruth as well as Georgia tourist attractions such as the statue of Br'er Rabbit in downtown Eatonton, Georgia.

In 1992, the Katonah Museum of Art would display a thirty-year retrospective of Cober's visual reportage of news, culture and the environment. The exhibition would travel to Dartmouth College in New Hampshire and then to the Montgomery Museum of Fine Arts in Alabama. The exhibition was curated by Steven Heller

Four years after his death, an exhibition of his work, titled Alan E. Cober: A Retrospective Afterlife, was organized by the Ringling School of Art and appeared at the University at Buffalo in 2002. The exhibit included over 100 drawings and was on display from February 15 through May 18 of 2002.

== Bibliography ==
Cober would illustrate 25 books, two of which made The New York Times Ten Best Illustrated Books: Winter's Eve (1969) and Mr. Corbett's Ghost (1968). Below is a partial list.

- Eastward to India: Vasco Da Gama's Voyage, by George Sanderlin, HarperCollins Publishers, 1965
- Nothingatall, Nothingatall, Nothingatall by Robert Paul Smith, Harper & Row, 1965
- Tale of a Black Cat, by Carl A. Withers, Henry Holt & Company, 1966
- The Gumdrop Necklace, by, Phyllis La Farge, Knopf, 1967
- Viollet, by Julia Cunningham, Pantheon Books, 1966
- Mister Corbett's Ghost by Leon Garfield, Pantheon Books. 1968
- Beowulf:a new telling by Robert Nye, 1968
- Your Friend, the Insect, by Florence M. White, Knopf, 1968
- The Wild Ducks and the Goose, by Carl Withers, Holt, Rinehart and Winston, 1968
- Winter's eve by Natalia Maree Belting, Holt McDougal, 1969
- Escape, by Ota Hofman, Knopf, 1970
- The Dark is Rising by Susan Cooper, Atheneum Books, 1974
- The Trial by Franz Kafka, The Limited Editions Club, 1975
- The Forgotten Society:92 drawgings, By Alan E. Cober, Dover Publications
- Ulysses by James Joyce, The Franklin Library, 1976
- Collected Poems, Essays on Poetry by Edgar Allan Poe, The Franklin Library, 1977
- Aaron's Door by Miska Miles, Little Brown and Company, 1977
- Jailbird by Kurt Vonnegut Jr., The Franklin Library, 1979
- The Naked and the Dead by Norman Mailer, The Franklin Library, 1979
- Cobers Choice, Dutton Books, 1979
- Exile and the Kingdom, by Albert Camus, The Franklin Library, 1980
- The Safety Net, by Heinrich Böll, The Franklin Library, 1981
- The Tragedies of Sophocles, Franklin Mint, 1981
- Giant Cold by Peter Dickenson, Kindle Edition, Reprint Edition, 2016 by Open Road Media

== As an educator ==
Cober taught at the State University of New York at Buffalo, the University of Georgia, and the Ringling School of Art and Design in Sarasota, Florida.

While teaching in Buffalo, an assignment was given out on Thursday, sketches were due on Friday and the finished piece was due the following Thursday. Classes were only held on Thursday and Friday because he flew to Buffalo on Thursday from downstate New York to teach the class, then flew back home on Friday. He also required at least one sketch a day in a personal journal. The assignments were usually 'live', meaning that the whole class' final pieces were submitted to a publication, and they chose one to print. The class took field trips to Toronto to see Henrik Drescher, to Phillip Burke's studio, to the Buffalo Museum to draw, to the Anthropology Lab on Campus to draw (dead creatures, including a dead person). Everything Cober taught centered around drawing. In his life drawing classes he was never interested in having the figure look exactly the way it should in nature. An interesting drawing was more important to him as a teacher.

He said of his teaching: "My students call it 'traumatic drawing' because of where I take them to draw."

== Awards and honors ==
In 2001, family and friends of Cober established the Alan E. Cober Memorial Fund at the University of Buffalo to honor his memory and body of work and to advance graphic illustration.

He was the youngest artist ever named Artist of the Year by the Artists Guild in New York City, in 1966

- Illustration Hall of Fame, Society of Illustrators, 2011
- Hamilton King Award, Society of Illustrators, 1969
- Ten Gold and two Silver medals, Society of Illustrators
- Distinguished Educator in the Arts Award, Society of Illustrators, 1998
- President of the Illustrators Workshop (1974-1993)
