= Windsor Castle (novel) =

1842 novel

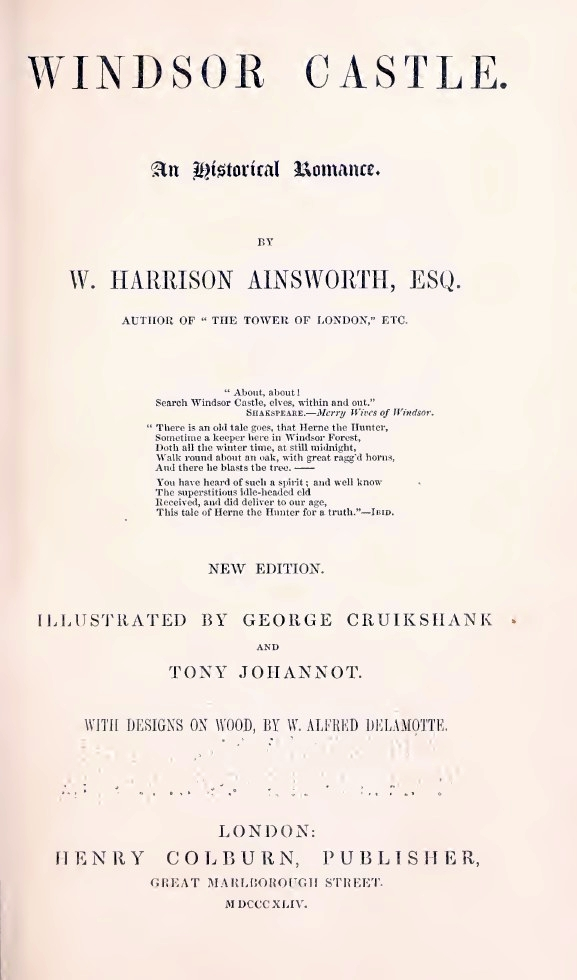
- Author: William Harrison Ainsworth
- Language: English
- Genre: Historical
- Publisher: Henry Colburn
- Publication date: 1842
- Publication place: United Kingdom
- Media type: Print

Windsor Castle is a novel by William Harrison Ainsworth serially published in 1842. It is a historical romance with gothic elements that depicts Henry VIII's pursuit of Anne Boleyn. Intertwined with the story are the actions of Herne the Hunter, a legendary ghost that haunts Windsor woods.

== Background ==
The first mention of Windsor Castle comes in a letter to Crossley 17 November 1841: "I am just now finishing Old St. Paul's and am consequently very busy [...] I have made all arrangements to start my Magazine at Christmas next, and have engaged Tony Johannot (the artist), who is now at work for me [...] Windsor Castle, of course, forms the main feature of the design, and I propose commencing the story with Henry the Eighth entering into the Castle on the morning of St. George's Day, 1529, attended by Anne Boleyn and the Cardinals Wosley and Campeggio. I intend making Lord Surrey the hero of the story. what say you?"

Ainsworth wrote Windsor Castle in 1842 while he was publishing The Miser's Daughter. During this time, he was constantly working to publish the novel by April, and Ainsworth only stopped when his mother, Ann Ainsworth, died on 15 March 1842. John Forster wrote to Ainsworth following the death of Ann to offer assistance with the work: "I imagine that you will defer the Windsor Castle this month – but should you not do so, I might be of some assistance to you. I have all my Henry VIII books here, and if you told me some particular thing you wanted — it may be horrible conceit — but somehow I think I might be of some beggarly service to you. At all events, in that or lesser matters, try if for old affection's sake you can discover anything for me to do for you".

After declining the service of Forster, it was published in a serialised form in the Ainsworth's Magazine starting July 1842 and ending in June 1843. There was some overlap with The Miser's Daughter, and George Cruikshank, illustrator of The Miser's Daughter later became illustrator of Windsor Castle after the prior work finished. It was published by Henry Colburn as a three-decker novel in 1843. Chapman and Hall published a cheap version of Ainsworth's works in late 1849, with a misprint in Windsor Castle that marked the later editions. In a letter to Charlies Ollier, Ainsworth wrote "Windsor Castle was worked off during my absence in Spain, and I had not observed the vexatious error into which the accursed printer had fallen, until you called my attention to it. It should be 1657 — and is so given in the edition of the romance from which your copy was printed. What a pest those readers are! I have written to have the date corrected: but twenty thousand copies will contain this error."

During the initial publication of Windsor Castle, over 30,000 copies were sold and the work was in high demand. It was continually in print until the 1960s, and appeared in multiple languages; a French paper Le Messenger carried a translation of the work soon after its original release. The novel was adapted into a play called Herne the Hunter, with a focus on the particular section dealing with the title character in the original novel.

== Story ==
The focus of the novels is on the events surrounding Henry VIII's replacing Catherine of Aragon with Anne Boleyn as his wife. During Henry's pursuit of Boleyn, the novel describes other couples, including the Earl of Surrey and Lady Elizabeth Fitzgerald, a match Henry does not support. However, some of the individuals oppose Henry and his desires for Boleyn, including Thomas Wyatt who wants her for himself and Cardinal Wolsey, who uses his own daughter, Mabel Lyndwood, to lure Henry away from Boleyn. Eventually, Wolsey turns to outing Wyatt's desires for Boleyn to the Court, which almost results in Wyatt's execution but is stopped before that point. Wolsey is then kicked out of the court and is executed himself.

Intertwined with the Court is the story of Herne the Hunter, a spirit of Windsor Forest. He is an evil force that seeks to take the souls of various individuals, and Henry tries to stop him, but is never able to do so. Eventually, Wyatt and Lyndwood are captured by Herne. The two fall in love and try to escape, but Mabel drowns. As the main plot progresses, Catherine accepts her fate but also warns Boleyn that Henry will treat her in the same way. It is revealed that Boleyn was involved with Henry Norris, and Henry uses this as evidence to have Boleyn executed. The story ends with Boleyn being replaced by Jane Seymour.

=== Illustrations ===
The illustrations for Windsor Castle dominate the text. They were started by Tony Johannot, a French illustrator. After producing four illustrations for the Ainsworth's Magazine, he was replaced by Cruikshank as the illustrator for the rest of the work. Cruikshank, during the beginning of the publication of Windsor Castle was busy producing illustrations for Ainsworth's The Miser's Daughter. In terms of style, Cruikshank's illustrations are similar to those of Remebrandt. In addition to the two illustrators, W. Alfred Delamotte worked on the novel.

Ainsworth told Delamotte exactly what he wanted for his work, and, in a letter written with these orders, said, "I shall be glad to see you to a family dinner at half-past three o'clock to-morrow-Sunday. Bring your sketch-books with you [...] Remind Mr. Costello, when you see him, to get the order from Lady Mary Fox for her apartments at Windsor. You had better go down to Hampton Court and sketch Will Sommers, and some of the other figures in the old pictures of Henry the Eight's time, carefully." Delamotte created 87 woodcut illustrations that focused on trees or architectural features. He also added three images that depicted a plan for Windsor Great Park, of 1529, and two for Windsor Castle, of 1530 and 1843. The three volumes edition in 1843 only contained three steel etchings by Cruikshank, with one of them being the frontispiece. These served as the only illustrations. A later one volume edition was printed with all of the illustrations.

== Themes ==
Of all the characters, Herne was a favourite of many individuals because of the dynamics of his character. He is deals with pacts similar to the one made with Faust, a topic that Ainsworth was interested in and used in other stories. Ainsworth was also interested in the tradition of Herne, and used a comedic passage from The Merry Wives of Windsor about Herne as an epigram for Windsor Castle. The individual aspect focused on was Herne's oak tree. Ainsworth's novel provides a version of Herne is one that he creates his own origin for Herne: Herne served under Richard II as the forest keeper. While hunting with the Richard II, Herne prevented the king from being killed but ended up dying himself. To save Herne's life, Richard and his party turn to Philip Urswick to heal him. Urswick saves Herne, but makes a deal with Herne's rivals to take away all of his abilities so he is no longer favoured by Richard. After disappearing into the woods, he is found hanging from a tree but disappears soon after. Afterward, Urswick explains that Herne's rivals would then be cursed.

The supernatural story concludes with Herne returning to lead his rivals in a hunt through the forest. After luring the men into the woods, mystical events happen which forces the rivals to become Herne's servants. After confronted by Richard over the strange incidents, Herne tells Richard that he will forever haunt Windsor Forest. The story, however, is told by one of the characters and is corrected by an unidentified man that is possibly Herne. Herne then provides an alternate story of his curse as coming from a woman, which caused him to kill a nun and, in response to the murder, kill himself. Other characters also provide stories about Herne, which represents aspects about folk tales in general and is similar to Ainsworth described his outlaw characters with the addition of satanic aspects to his personality. The character of Herne is also connected to Cernunnous, the Celtic god of the hunt, which was an image of nature and also a version of the devil in Christian belief.

== Sources ==
Windsor Castle is rooted in the legend of Herne the Hunter. Stories, including those found in Shakespeare's Richard II describe the supernatural keeper of Windsor forest. The legend appealed to Ainsworth, and a tree that was supposedly haunted by Herne still existed in the forest until 1863 when a storm blew it down. Although the tree was destroyed, Queen Victoria planted a new oak in the same spot. The old tree served to make a bust of Shakespeare and the bust was put in the Windsor Castle library. Not all of the characters were based only in tradition; most of the characters, from Henry VIII to members of his court are based on historical figures.

== Critical response ==
W H Horne, in A New Spirit of the Age, claims that Ainsworth's "so-called historical romance of 'Windsor Castle' is not to be regarded as a work of literature open to serious criticism. It is a picture book, and full of very pretty pictures. Also full of catalogues of numberless suits of clothes. Such a passion, indeed, he has for describing clothes, that he frequently gives us two suits with a single body [...] As to plot or story it does not pretend to any."

In 1911, S. M. Ellis claims that "Windsor Castle was thus a great success; and it is still very popular. This is not to be wondered at, for, despite some faults in construction, it is one of Ainsworth's most fascinating works [...] More powerfully still did he interpret the mystery of trees in this romance [...] Most skilfully, too, he adapted and revivified for the purposes of his woodland romance the ancient and weirdly picturesque legend of Herne the Hunter". Ellis continues by claiming that "Windsor Castle is one of the best examples of Ainsworth's skill in combining a vivid and exciting narrative with wealth of historical detail and scenic description, the whole interwoven with supernatural events in the most natural manner, so much so that it is difficult to say where the mundane ends and the occult begins. It was an art quite peculiar to this author, who, by the force and interest of his narrative, compels the reader to accept his supernatural beings and improbable events as a necessary and essential part of the dramatic work in hand." George Worth, in 1972, focuses on the winding plots and gaps that Ainsworth leaves behind as he says, "Despite the basic unity of the novel, then, we have the feeling that Ainsworth allows himself to stray too often from the main, broad track of his narrative and to abandon his reader at the end of little trails that lead nowhere." In 2003, Stephen Carver claims that the novel's depiction of Herne "is Ainsworth at his gothic best, rivalling Lewis, Maturin and even Byron. Herne effortlessly steals every scene in which he appears, much as he steals souls."
