= Silver on the Tree =

1977 novel by Susan Cooper

- Author: Susan Cooper
- Language: English
- Series: The Dark Is Rising Sequence
- Genre: Contemporary fantasy
- Publisher: Chatto & Windus
- Publication date: 1977
- Publication place: United Kingdom
- Media type: Print (hardback & paperback)
- Pages: 368 pp
- ISBN: 0689500882
- Preceded by: The Grey King (1975)

Silver on the Tree is a contemporary fantasy novel by Susan Cooper, published by Chatto & Windus in 1977. It is the final entry in the five book Dark Is Rising Sequence.

== Plot ==
Will Stanton and his mentor Merriman, two of the last Old Ones, gather allies and magical objects to help defeat the rising Dark. They ally with Bran, a Welsh descendant of King Arthur, and the three Drew children, to form the Six who are prophesied to triumph over the powers of the Dark. Significant mythical elements in the book include the bard Taliesin (under his alternate name Gwion), King Gwyddno Garanhir and the Drowned Hundred, the Welsh tradition of the Mari Llwyd, Arthur's ship Prydwen, and the Ritual of oak and mistletoe.

== Critical reception ==
The book was compared less favorably to earlier instalments in the series, with particular criticism towards its final battle. However, it still received generally positive reviews. Mari Ness of Tor.com praised it for being "beautifully and lyrically written", but was critical of its ending and its use of the damsel in distress trope. Nevertheless, she called it a "solid ending" for the series. The Children's Literature Review criticized elements of the book's plot, such as the use of time travel, but praised its setting and descriptive writing.

Kirkus Reviews was critical of the book's climax, saying "to the end the discrepancy between her grand scheme and the particulars of the story is unbridged, giving a morally and intellectually hollow ring to the whole." Rebecca Fisher of fantasyliterature.com praised Cooper's subtle writing, but criticized the book's pacing choices and lack of suspense.

Silver on the Tree received a Tir na n-Og Award in 1978. It was nominated for a Locus Award for Best Fantasy Novel and a Ditmar Award, but did not win.
