= The Dark Is Rising Sequence =

Series of fantasy novels for children by Susan Cooper

- British omnibus edition front cover
- Author: Susan Cooper
- Cover artist: Oliver Burston
- Language: English
- Genre: Children's fantasy novels
- Publisher: Random House Children's Books
- Publication date: 1984
- Publication place: United Kingdom
- Media type: Print (trade paperback)
- Pages: 786 pp
- ISBN: 0-14-031688-4
- OCLC: 50597816

The Dark Is Rising Sequence is a series of five contemporary fantasy novels for older children and young adults that were written by the British author Susan Cooper and published from 1965 to 1977. The first book in the series, Over Sea, Under Stone, was originally conceived as a stand-alone novel, and the sequence gets its name from the second novel in the series, The Dark Is Rising. The Dark Is Rising Sequence is used as an overarching title in several omnibus, boxed-set, and coordinated editions; but the title of The Dark Is Rising is also used for the whole series.

The books depict a struggle between forces of good and evil called "The Light" and "The Dark", and draw upon Arthurian legends, Celtic mythology, Norse mythology and English folklore. The books were also influenced by Cooper's reading of Robert Graves' study of mythology, The White Goddess. Both magical and ordinary children are prominent throughout the series. It was inaugurated in 1965 with the U.K. publication by Jonathan Cape of Over Sea, Under Stone. The sequels were published 1973 to 1977, almost simultaneously in the U.K. and the U.S. (Note: Almost simultaneous: ISFDB reports 1965 UK and 1966 US publication of the first book and matching publication years for the sequels: April US and May UK, volume 2; US months missing, volumes 3 and 4; September US and October UK, volume 5.) Volume four, The Grey King (1975), won both the Newbery Medal, recognizing the year's "most distinguished contribution to American literature for children", and the inaugural Tir na n-Og Award for English-language books with Welsh background. The concluding Silver on the Tree (1977) also won the annual Tir na n-Og Award.

The novel The Dark Is Rising features Will Stanton, age 11, (Note: Will Stanton's eleventh birthday is momentous in the book. In the Hollywood version he is 13 to 14 years old (and American) in order to help distinguish him from Harry Potter, a later creation but earlier international film success who learns on his eleventh birthday that he is a wizard.) who learns on that birthday that he is one of an ancient magical people called "Old Ones", and is destined to wield the powers of The Light in the ancient struggle with The Dark. In the U.S. it was a Newbery Honor Book (runner up for the medal). Its 2007 film adaptation, titled The Seeker in America and The Dark Is Rising in Britain, made significant plot and character divergences from the book.

== Characters ==
Simon, Jane, and Barnabas Drew: The main characters of the first novel, the Drew family, are human children who have known Merriman Lyon as their "Great Uncle Merry" for years. While on a holiday in Cornwall, they get caught up in the battle between the Light and the Dark and join the search for the Things of Power. In the first novel, Over Sea, Under Stone, they search for the legendary Grail of King Arthur. They also appear in the third book, Greenwitch, and the last book in the series, Silver on the Tree. In the poem featured prominently throughout The Dark Is Rising, they are the ones referred to as "three from the track". Their surname is linked with Will Stanton's in British paleohistory; see Stanton Drew stone circles.

- Simon Drew: Simon is the eldest of the Drews. In Over Sea, Under Stone, Simon and Barney are the two to go into the cave and retrieve the Grail. In Greenwitch, he is jealous of Will because Merriman brought him to Cornwall for "unnecessary" reasons, but eventually warms to him. He loves sailing and anything to do with ships.
- Jane Drew: Jane is the middle Drew. In Greenwitch, Jane is allowed to attend the Greenwitch ceremony, which is traditionally for female locals only, and through her compassion develops a special bond with the entity which constitutes the magical aspect of the Greenwitch. She subsequently receives from the entity the case containing the coded manuscript for deciphering the runes on the Grail. She also develops a special bond with the Lady of the Light in Silver on the Tree.
- Barnabas (Barney) Drew: Barney is the youngest of the Drews. He loves Arthurian legends and, although he is quite wary of his talent at first, paints. In Greenwitch, Barney sketches a picture of the bay, which is later stolen by an agent of the Dark, but Merriman recovers it and presents it to Tethys as a gift.

Old Ones: Ancient and immortal, the Old Ones are mystical beings who possess great magical power. They are found in all parts of the world and are of many races and cultures. Capable of performing seemingly impossible feats, including freezing time and controlling the elements, they serve the Light in the war against the Dark. The Great Lords of the Dark have many similar characteristics and abilities but are not Old Ones. The two factions struggle to determine the destiny of mankind; while the Light fights for freedom and free will, the Dark fights for chaos, confusion and the subversion of man's agency.

Will Stanton: The main character of the second novel, and a major character in the remaining novels of the series, he is the seventh son of a seventh son, in a large, close human family. His eleventh birthday marks the beginning of his magical awakening and rise to power as the last of the Old Ones. The Dark Is Rising tells how he came to power, met Merriman Lyon, and accumulated the six "signs" to help fight the Dark. Will is the last of the Old Ones; no others will be born after him. In Greenwitch, he is invited to come to Cornwall by Merriman in order to help recover the Grail and cypher that reveals how to read the runes on the Grail. He later gives Jane a bracelet of gold engraved with the words "power from the Greenwitch", which she throws into the sea as an offering to the Greenwitch in appreciation for its help. In The Grey King, Will goes to Wales to recover from sickness, where he meets Bran and awakens the Sleepers. In Silver on the Tree, Will travels with Bran to the Lost Land to recover the crystal sword Eirias, and helps to vanquish the Dark. Will is the only Old One to remain on Earth afterward, and the only one of the Light's allies who remembers the struggle against the Dark; in this, he is referred to as "the watchman", staying behind to keep watch for any attempt by the Dark to return.

Cooper named Will after William Shakespeare.

Merriman Lyon: The first Old One, Lyon shares a special bond with Will Stanton, last of the line. A friend of the Drew family for over a generation, he helps and protects Barney, Jane, and Simon as they quest for the Grail. They occasionally refer to him as "Great Uncle Merry" or "Gumerry". Throughout the series, Merriman is portrayed in numerous historical periods, but particularly as King Arthur's chief adviser, the mythical Merlin; in Silver on the Tree, Arthur calls him "Mer Lion", old English for "my lion".

The Lady: The Lady is the most powerful of the Light, an Old One of seemingly greater strength than Merriman. Gentle, wise and enigmatic, she is a pivotal figure throughout the series, appearing usually at important moments to turn the tide in the Light's favour. She is an especial friend and mentor to Will and Jane. At one point in The Dark Is Rising, Will Stanton makes a critical mistake during a battle with the Dark and is saved by the Lady. Merriman tells Will that the Lady on her own is the only one of the Light able to overcome the full power of the Dark, although at a great cost. The sacrifice by the Lady is a critical point in the Story because she is a key element of the battle. At a later high ceremony of Old Ones, the Lady is missing and Merriman tells Will that her depleted power prevents her arrival, and she is beyond their magic to rescue but will return. She represents the Lady of the Lake, or the Lady of Avalon, King Arthur's sister, as they both embark on Arthur's boat Pridwen in Silver on the Tree. The Lady, like King Arthur, is affiliated with The Light and the High Magic. In Silver on the Tree, she initially can only communicate with Jane Drew, the one girl among the Six, telling Jane they share a special bond in being female, and calls her "Jane, Jana, Juno", referring to Jana (in Roman mythology, a variant form of Diana) or Juno, the queen of the gods.

The Black Rider: One of the great Lords of the Dark, comparable to Merriman in power and influence. The Rider is the major nemesis of Will during his many trials. He patronises John Wayland Smith's establishment, where he meets Will for the first time and attempts to bring him over to the Dark. He is given one name by the humans in the story: Mitothin (a name connected with the jötunn Loki, who helps bring about Ragnarok).

The White Rider: Another servant and Lord of the Dark, introduced in Silver on the Tree. The White Rider is almost equal in power to the Black Rider, and despite being feminine in her true form, often affects a masculine guise while attacking agents of the Light. She is revealed as disguising herself as Blodwen Rowlands, an "aunt" figure to Bran Davies. She acts kind and caring, to keep an eye on Bran while developing emotional bonds, while controlling events around Cader Idris, which means "chair of Arthur", and the Sleepers. Will Stanton hypothesized that the monochromatic 'colour' of the White Rider's robes, like those of the Black Rider, reflected the extremism of their evil—either darkened by their ignorance, or blinded by the brightness of their ideas.

The Walker: A human who betrayed the Light and was cursed to carry the Sign of Bronze, one of six Things of Power that repel the Dark, through the centuries until the last Old One claimed it from him. The Walker was once Hawkin, a liege man and foster son of Merriman during the 13th century. His betrayal of the Light stemmed largely from Merriman's acceptance of Hawkin's willingness to sacrifice his life to protect the Book of Gramarye, the secrets of which the human Hawkin can neither possess nor partake of. In The Dark Is Rising, his appearance in Will Stanton's town precipitates Will's "awakening" and rise to power. He presents Will with his second sign.

The Sleepers: Ancient knights who served during the time of King Arthur. In The Grey King, they are awakened from a mystic slumber by the Harp of the Light, to ride against the Dark during the final battle in Silver on the Tree.

Pendragon: This is a reference to two characters. First, it is the figurative title referring to status as a leader, of several traditional Kings of the Britons, notably Arthur. It is also his son in this series, Bran Davies, who is predestined to wield the Crystal Sword of Light that is vital to the final conflict with the Dark. Bran Davies is brought forward in time by Merriman at the request of his mother, Guinevere, who feared that Arthur would reject Bran as a true son because of Guinevere's affair with Lancelot. Bran is an albino, meaning he has very pale skin and white hair, eyebrows, and eyelashes, but his eyes are an unusual tawny colour. Will meets him in Wales during The Grey King, where they wake the Sleepers using the Harp. In Silver on the Tree, Bran and Will travel to the Lost Land and recover the sword Eirias.

The rooks: The majority of these birds are servants of the Dark and attract their forces wherever they are seen.

Farmer Dawson: An Old One who lives near Will Stanton and presents him with his first Sign.

John Wayland Smith: Another Old One who lives near Will Stanton; he is also a skilled smith. Though he is affiliated with the Light, he aids all who pass in his smithy. It is suggested that he might be Wayland the Smith of Germanic mythology.

== Artefacts ==
Things of Power: The Old Ones have four Things of Power that will be used in the final battle which will allow them to defeat the Dark: the circle of Signs, the Grail, the Harp, and the Sword. They are obtained in The Dark Is Rising, Over Sea, Under Stone, The Grey King, and Silver on the Tree, respectively. Greenwitch is the story of the recovery of the stolen Grail.

- The Signs: A set of six circles quartered (divided evenly in four sections) by crosses. The six signs are each made of a different material and represent a different element: wood, bronze, iron, water, fire, and stone. The six Signs represent the Six champions of the Light, referred to in the recurring Poem of the Dark Is Rising series, as "three from the Circle, three from the Track". The signs have the power to repel the Dark.
- The Grail: Made in imitation of the Holy Grail from the King Arthur legends, it is an artefact of power used by the Light. There are markings on it in a writing similar to Ogham, which is long lost. It is eventually translated by the Old Ones, thanks to a coded manuscript inside a metal case held by the Greenwitch.
- The Harp (the harp of gold): A golden harp that is obtained by Will Stanton and Bran Davies from a triumvirate of the High Magic by answering three riddles. The Light uses it in The Grey King in order to wake the Sleepers in preparation for the final battle. Whoever plays the harp creates powerful music that negates any magic, through the protection of the High Magic.
- The Crystal Sword: A magical sword, commissioned by the Light, crafted in the magical Lost Lands by the Lost King. It is named Eirias; therefore, "blazing", also called sword of the sunrise. In the presence of the Dark, it burns with blue fire. It can cut portals through magical barriers, as seen in Silver on the Tree, and is encased in a magical scabbard of invisibility. It is used by Bran Davies, the Pendragon, heir of King Arthur, to cut the one fully blossomed silver flower on the Midsummer's Tree, which is caught by Merriman.

The Book of Gramarye: The ancient Book of the Old Ones, it is an Old One's rite of passage, while also teaching everything about their powers, and through it, they experience the magical spells. Gramarye, or grimoire, from the Old French word grammaire and the Old English word grammar, initially referred to all books, most written in Latin, which almost no one could read, and perceived by the masses as "magical". The Book of Gramarye is protected by an enchanted device of a pendulum in a longcase clock, that if touched, will detonate and destroy any human that attempts to gain access to the book. This powerful book is further protected in that it is written in the Old Speech, which only an Old One can read and understand. It is blasted out of existence by Merriman after Will has read it.

The Doors: A set of carved oak doors that lead through Time. Old Ones can summon these doors to appear at will to transport themselves through time and space. The doors disappear when the Old Ones pass through them, accompanied by the haunting bell chime music of the Light. Their origin is not explained in the books.

Midsummer's Tree: In the Chiltern Hills, England, The Tree produces a silver flower, which blooms once every 700 years, and is the final challenge for the Six of the Light. The person who obtains the silver flower gains control of the High Magic, to put out of Time the Dark or the Light forever. Bran Davies, the Pendragon and heir of King Arthur, wields the Crystal Sword to cut the fully blossomed silver flower on the Midsummer's Tree, which is caught by Merriman, making the Light victorious.

== The Magics ==
Old Magic: A powerful elemental magic, of which the Light and the Dark are the two opposite extremes.

Wild Magic: The magic of nature, first used in The Dark Is Rising to provide strength to the forces of the Light in the book's final battle. In Greenwitch, we learn that the Wild Magic is equal in strength to both the Dark and the Light, but that it stands apart and is unaffected by either.

High Magic: The most powerful magic, being of the Cosmos. A spell of this type is used by the Old Ones in Greenwitch to be able to communicate with Tethys, the Queen of the Sea, and plead for her help in obtaining the scroll that will help translate the writing on the Grail. In The Grey King, Will Stanton and Bran Davies obtain the Harp of Gold from a place guarded by the High Magic after being tested by a Lord of the Dark, a Lord of the Light, and a Lord of the High Magic.

== Old Speech ==
Old Speech is the spoken form of the ancient language of the Old Ones. When an Old One comes to power, this language is used instinctively by the Old One when speaking to members of the Light or the Dark. Will Stanton begins to do this without even realizing it. When an Old One speaks the Old Speech in front of a normal human, it will sound like gibberish. Some agents of the Dark, such as the Rider, can also speak Old Speech, but with a distinctive accent which gives them away to the Old Ones.

== Rhymes ==
Small rhyming prophecies serve to guide the protagonists throughout the series. Science fiction author and filker Julia Ecklar has set these rhyming prophecies to music, and the resulting song, also called "The Dark Is Rising", won the 1997 Pegasus Award for Best Sorcery Song.

== Works in the series ==
=== Over Sea, Under Stone ===
The characters in this book, which was published several years before the others, are younger than those in the rest of the series, and the issues are presented as less cosmic. Overall the book is aimed at younger readers more than the other four books in the series.

In this tale, Susan Cooper introduces the audience to Merriman, a pivotal character for the forces of the Light and also ties him with Simon, Jane and Barney Drew, three young mortal children, in a quest by the sea which will lead them over sea and under stone to find a grail of legend to help the Light in its struggle against the Dark.

=== The Dark Is Rising ===
The second book is set not on the Cornish coast but in rural Buckinghamshire, near the River Thames, and features a new group of characters. Will Stanton, the protagonist, begins to have strange experiences on his 11th birthday, just before Christmas. He learns he is one of the Old Ones, a guardian and warrior for the Light, and that he must help find the four Things of Power in order that the Light may battle the forces of the Dark. The first of these is the Circle of Six Signs, and the novel follows Will's adventures as he finds each one of these mandalas, which are then joined into a completed circle and used to ward off the forces of the Dark. The book features elements of English folklore that are especially associated with the Thames Valley, with Herne the Hunter and Wayland the Smith making an appearance. Merriman/Merlin also makes an appearance, linking this book to the previous one.

The Dark Is Rising was an American Library Association Newbery Honor Book in 1974. Based on a 2007 online poll, the U.S. National Education Association listed it as one of "Teachers' Top 100 Books for Children". In 2012 it was ranked number 22 among all-time children's novels in a survey published by School Library Journal, a monthly with primarily U.S. audience.

=== Greenwitch ===
This story returns to the Cornish village, and unites the characters from the first two books. The chalice has been stolen from the museum, and the children must recover it.

Jane Drew witnesses the creation of a ritualistic offering known as the 'Greenwitch', and senses both great power and great sadness in it. She wishes that the Greenwitch could be happy, and that wish has important consequences later when it turns out that the Greenwitch possesses something that will unlock the secrets of the Grail.

=== The Grey King ===
In this book, Will is sent to the farm of some distant relatives to recuperate after an illness. Here in the Welsh hills he meets Bran, the Pendragon, son of King Arthur, and befriends him. He must also awaken the Sleepers to fight the Dark.

The Grey King was awarded the 1976 Newbery Medal.

=== Silver on the Tree ===
All of the main characters from the other books in the sequence come together in this book, some meeting for the first time, and the struggle between the Light and the Dark is resolved. After the Light wins the battle, Bran is offered a chance to rejoin his father, but chooses to give up his immortality to stay with his friends and his mortal adoptive father. All immortal characters except Will Stanton leave the Earth forever. All the mortal characters lose all memory of any dealings with magic and the Old Ones, though the Drews and Bran have snatches of something come back to them in dreams. Will is the Watchman, who will watch out for any attempts of the Dark to return.

== Locations ==
Nearly all the locations mentioned in the books are based on real places. Over Sea, Under Stone and Greenwitch are set in Trewissick, which is based on a village in southern Cornwall called Mevagissey which Susan Cooper used to visit as a child. The Dark Is Rising is set in the part of Buckinghamshire where Cooper grew up: Huntercombe is based on the small village of Dorney, and the Manor is Dorney Court. The Welsh setting in The Grey King and Silver on the Tree is the area around Aberdyfi, the village where Cooper's grandmother was born and where her parents lived.

== Critical reception ==
John Clute wrote in The Encyclopedia of Fantasy "The overall tale evolves – not without occasional narrative confusion when time paradoxes and puzzles must be confronted – towards a guardedly affirmative climax in which it seems that the various young protagonists plus Bran Davies (King Arthur's son) may succeed in staving off entropy and totalitarianism."

Karen Patricia Smith wrote "Susan Cooper has come to be recognized as a major author of books for children and young adults. Her first work for children, Over Sea, Under Stone came as a response to a contest designed to honor the memory of E. Nesbit. Cooper's major contribution to date has been The Dark Is Rising series, which greatly expands the mythical theme suggested in Over Sea, Under Stone and reveals Cooper's extraordinary prowess as an author of fantasy... The shadowy aspect of the conflict and the inability to 'read' clearly the motivations of some of the characters are areas in which Cooper has been criticized. However, I feel that the ambiguity of protagonists and antagonists is a deliberate literary device. Rather than succumbing to artistic flaw, Cooper goes beyond the conventional expectations of her readers by inviting them to glimpse the complex, the unexplainable, and often the threatening aspects of mankind's nature. By offering the thesis that the human psyche may manifest itself in explicit actions or present itself in a mysterious and often frustrating manner, Cooper exceeds the traditional presentations of good versus evil often found in fantasy literature."

Mary Corran has written "Cooper's scholarly knowledge of legend, and skill in drawing together all the complexities of the five books into a triumphant finale, produce an epic of great power. There are differences in quality in the novels--Greenwitch...is perhaps the weakest, and The Dark Is Rising and The Grey King the strongest; Silver on the Tree, while suitably life-affirming in its conclusion, is slightly preachy, but that is a natural hazard of the subject matter. Cooper deals with the innate antagonism between mortals and immortals impressively, and in The Grey King reaches great heights as she mingles the worlds and peoples of legend and the present day. The sequence is a remarkable achievement, and Cooper's gifts for description and characterization provide additional pleasure to novels already replete with intellectual enjoyment."

Joel Chaston writes "Among Cooper's books for children, the Dark Is Rising series is her masterwork. The five novels in it are rich with symbolism and poetic passages. The Dark Is Rising, perhaps the best single book of the series, certainly rivals and sometimes surpasses the work of the major fantasy writers--with whose work it is frequently compared."

Amelia A. Rutledge says that the series "integrates the traditional lore of the British Isles with modern concerns. Her work, although commercially designated for a younger audience, exemplifies sophisticated mythopoeic writing not limited to that age group and is one of the major contributions to Arthurian fantasy of the 1970s."

Professor Michael D. C. Drout argues that Cooper makes greater "use of Anglo-Saxon source materials" than other critics have identified: "Cooper's uses of Anglo-Saxon sources are allusions that fit into a schema of history rather than (in the words of one reviewer) being merely tossed "pell-mell" into the mythical pot... It is Cooper's Anglo-Saxonism, I argue, which generates the notions of British national identity explicated in the novels, notions that contradict the author's overt political stance. In addition, Cooper's particular version of Anglo-Saxonism, with its strong focus on teaching and learning, is isomorphic to the ideology of adult/child power relations represented in the novels, an ideology that puts great weight on the value of obedience to authority. Adult/child power relations are both replicated and reinforced by two other sets of opposed terms: British/non-British and supernatural/mundane, and all of these terms are finally subsumed in Cooper's Manichaean binary, Light/Dark, leading to a closed symbolic economy which exalts personal obedience to authority and views Anglo-Saxons and their ideologies—as they were for the Venerable Bede in A.D. 771—as clearly on the side of the angels."

The New York Times Book Review wrote of the novel The Dark Is Rising "This is a muscular fantasy... The writing is robust, but noticeably better out of human time than at the Stanton hearth: as if the author's style, too, had experienced a salutary, magical translation... The fantastic style is virile and, for all its paraphernalia, spare. Susan Cooper's vocabulary is athletic; the complications are dense. Her book seems to have been prepared for a special small age group: those who can read with fluency and attention, but who haven't yet been afflicted by adolescent cynicism."

== Film adaptation ==
Following the successful film adaptations of other fantasy classics, it was announced in 2005 that the novel The Dark Is Rising was being developed as a major motion picture. Called The Seeker in the US, the film was a joint venture between 20th Century Fox and Walden Media. John Hodge wrote the screenplay and the film was directed by David L. Cunningham and produced by Marc E. Platt. Ian McShane played the role of Merriman Lyon while Alexander Ludwig played the young Will Stanton as an American. Frances Conroy and Christopher Eccleston (as The Rider) also star. Filming began in February 2007 in Bucharest, Romania. The film was released on 5 October 2007, in the United States and the UK. It was not successful.

Screenwriter Hodge made substantial changes to the novel's plot, tone, and characters. For example, to differentiate him from Harry Potter, the film version of Will Stanton is a 13- to 14-year-old American living in Britain. Hodge also felt that the "lyrical, poetic, kaleidoscopic fashion" of the book could not be filmed and felt compelled to add action for Will where "he doesn't actually do very much."

Cooper was disappointed by changes in the screenplay from the book and requested that some be undone. For example, she considered it crucial that Will is only 11 because that is before puberty. The film portrayed, and one of its trailers featured, Will as an adolescent teased for and preoccupied with his shyness and inexperience with girls.
