= Susan Cooper =

English fantasy writer

Susan Cooper FRSL
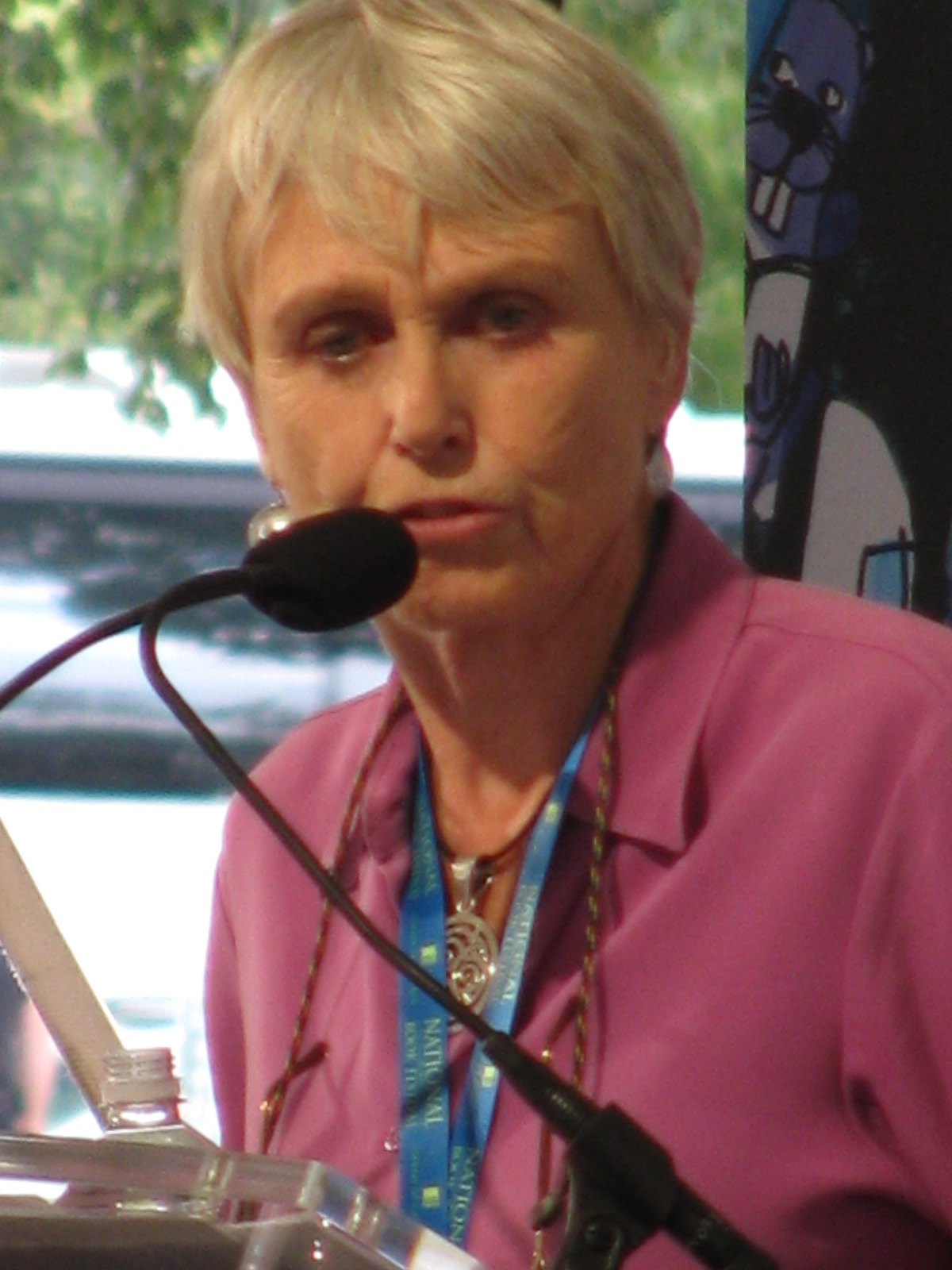
- Cooper in 2013
- Born: Susan Mary Cooper; 23 May 1935 (age 91); Burnham, Buckinghamshire, England, UK
- Education: Somerville College, Oxford
- Occupation: Writer
- Spouses: Nicholas Grant (m. 1963; div. 1983) Hume Cronyn (m. 1996; died 2003)
- Writing career
- Language: English
- Period: 1964–present
- Genre: Children's fantasy novels
- Notable work: The Dark Is Rising series
- Notable awards: Newbery Medal; 1976; Margaret A. Edwards Award; 2012
- Website: thelostland.com

Susan Mary Cooper (born 23 May 1935) is an English author of children's books. She is best known for The Dark Is Rising, a contemporary fantasy series set in England and Wales, which incorporates British mythology such as the Arthurian legends and Welsh folk heroes. For that work, in 2012 she won the lifetime Margaret A. Edwards Award from the American Library Association, recognizing her contribution to writing for teens. In the 1970s two of the five novels were named the year's best English-language book with an "authentic Welsh background" by the Welsh Books Council. In 2024, the Science Fiction and Fantasy Writers Association named her the 40th Damon Knight Memorial Grand Master in recognition of her significant contributions to the literature of science fiction and fantasy.

== Early life and education ==
Cooper was born in 1935 in Burnham, Buckinghamshire, to Ethel May (née Field) and her husband, John Richard Cooper. Her father had worked in the reading room of the Natural History Museum until going off to fight in the Second World War, from which he returned with a wounded leg. He then pursued a career in the offices of the Great Western Railway. Her mother was a teacher of ten-year-olds and eventually became deputy head of a large school. Susan's younger brother Roderick also grew up to become a writer.

Cooper lived in Buckinghamshire until she was 21, when her parents moved to her grandmother's village of Aberdyfi in Wales. She attended Slough High School and then earned a degree in English at Somerville College at the University of Oxford, where she was the first woman to edit the undergraduate newspaper Cherwell.

== Career and personal life ==
After graduating, she worked as a reporter for The Sunday Times (London) under Ian Fleming and wrote in her spare time. During that period she began work on the series The Dark Is Rising and finished her debut novel, the science fiction Mandrake, published by Hodder & Stoughton in 1964.

Cooper emigrated to the United States in 1963 to marry Nicholas J. Grant, a professor of metallurgy at the Massachusetts Institute of Technology, and a widower with three teenage children. They had two children. Cooper then became a full-time writer, focusing on The Dark Is Rising and on Dawn of Fear (1970), a novel based on her experiences of the Second World War. Eventually she wrote fiction for both children and adults, a series of picture books, film screenplays, and works for the stage.

Around the time of writing Seaward (1983), both of her parents died, and her marriage to Grant was dissolved.

In July 1996, she married the Canadian-American actor and her sometime co-author Hume Cronyn, the widower of Jessica Tandy. (Cronyn and Tandy had starred in the Broadway production of Foxfire, written by Cooper and Cronyn and staged in 1982.)

After Cronyn's death in 2003, she moved back to Massachusetts, building a house facing the North River in Marshfield, and also living in Cambridge. The history of the Marshfield area was the basis for her 2013 book Ghost Hawk, in which the spirit of a Wampanoag, whose people were decimated by European disease, witnesses the transformation of Massachusetts by the Plymouth Colony. She is a member of First Parish Unitarian Universalist Church of Scituate.

Hollywood adapted The Dark Is Rising (1973) as a film in 2007, The Seeker. Before she saw the film, Cooper stated that she had requested some changes to it, but had received no response.

From 2006 to 2012, Cooper was on the Board of the National Children's Book and Literacy Alliance (NCBLA), a US nonprofit organization that advocates for literacy, literature, and libraries.

In April 2017, Cooper gave the fifth annual Tolkien Lecture at Pembroke College, Oxford, speaking on the role of fantasy literature in contemporary society.

In 2019 she published The Shortest Day, based on her performance poem of the same title written for the Cambridge Christmas Revels in the 1970s.

== Awards ==
For her lifetime contribution as a children's writer, Cooper was U.S. nominee in 2002 for the biennial, international Hans Christian Andersen Award, the highest international recognition available to creators of children's books.

The American Library Association's Margaret A. Edwards Award recognises one writer and a particular body of work for "significant and lasting contribution to young adult literature". Cooper won the award in 2012 citing the five Dark Is Rising novels, published 1965 to 1977. The citation observed, "In one of the most influential epic high fantasies in literature, Cooper evokes Celtic and Arthurian mythology and masterly world-building in a high-stakes battle between good and evil, embodied in the coming of age journey of Will Stanton."

In 2013 Cooper was recognized with a World Fantasy Award for Life Achievement. She was elected a Fellow of the Royal Society of Literature in 2020. In 2024, the Science Fiction and Fantasy Writers Association named her the 40th Damon Knight Memorial Grand Master in recognition of her significant contributions to the literature of science fiction and fantasy.

She has also been recognised for single books:

- 1974, Newbery Honor (runner-up for the Medal), The Dark Is Rising (1973 novel)
- 1976, Newbery Medal, The Grey King
- 1976, Tir na n-Og Award, The Grey King
- 1978, Tir na n-Og Award, Silver on the Tree
- 1989, B'nai B'rith Janusz Korczak Literary Prize, Seaward

== Works ==
=== Biography ===
- J. B. Priestley: Portrait of an Author (London: Heinemann, 1970) – biography of the English writer and socialist John Boynton Priestley
- The Magic Maker: A Portrait of John Langstaff and His Christmas Revels (Candlewick Press, 2011) – juvenile biography of John Langstaff, founder of the Revels performances

=== Other nonfiction ===
- Behind the Golden Curtain: A View of the USA (Hodder & Stoughton and Scribner's, 1965)
- Dreams and Wishes: Essays on Writing for Children (Simon & Schuster, 1996)

=== Drama ===
- Foxfire, Cooper and Hume Cronyn (Samuel French Inc, 1982), stage playbook – produced on Broadway as Foxfire (1982) – based on the Foxfire books

Cooper wrote four screenplays produced for television, one supernatural tale for children and three more adaptations of books about Appalachia (as Foxfire).

- Dark Encounter (Shadows, Series 2; Thames Television, 1976)
- The Dollmaker (ABC, 1984)
- To Dance with the White Dog (Hallmark, 1993)
- Jewel (CBS, 2001)

=== Novels ===
The Dark Is Rising

- Over Sea, Under Stone (1965)
- The Dark Is Rising (1973)
- Greenwitch (1974)
- The Grey King (1975)
- Silver on the Tree (1977)

Boggart

- The Boggart (1993)
- The Boggart and the Monster (1997)
- The Boggart Fights Back (2018)

Other

- Mandrake (Hodder & Stoughton, 1964), science fiction for adults
- Dawn of Fear (1970), autobiographical World War II story
- Seaward (1983)
- King of Shadows (1999)
- Green Boy (2002)
- Victory (June 2006)
- Ghost Hawk (2013)

=== Children's picture books ===
- Jethro and the Jumbie (1979), illustrated by Ashley Bryan
- The Silver Cow: A Welsh Tale (1983), illustrated by Warwick Hutton
- The Selkie Girl (1986), illustrated by Warwick Hutton, a retelling of the Selkie legend
- Matthew's Dragon (1991), illustrated by Jos. A. Smith
- Tam Lin (1991), illustrated by Warwick Hutton, a retelling of the Tam Lin legend
- Danny and the Kings (1993), illustrated by Jos. A. Smith
- Frog (2002), illustrated by Jane Browne
- The Magician's Boy (2005), adapting her short play for the 1988 Revels, illustrated by Serena Riglietti
- The Word Pirates (2019), illustrated by Steven Kellogg
- The Shortest Day (2019), illustrated by Carson Ellis

=== Short fiction ===
- "Muffin", Amy Ehrlich, ed., When I Was Your Age: Original Stories about Growing Up (Volume 1) (Candlewick) – story set in World War II England (as Dawn of Fear)
- "Ghost Story", Don't Read This! (US, Front Street), Fingers on the Back of the Neck (UK, Puffin) – collection supporting IBBY
- Our White House: Looking In, Looking Out (Candlewick) – Cooper wrote one piece of this mixed-genre NCBLA collaboration
- The Exquisite Corpse Adventure (Candlewick) – Cooper wrote one episode of this sequential story collaboration of children's authors and illustrators by NCBLA for the LC website
- "The Caretakers", Haunted (Anderson Press collection, UK only)
