= Stratha'an =

Valley of the River Avon in Moray, Scotland

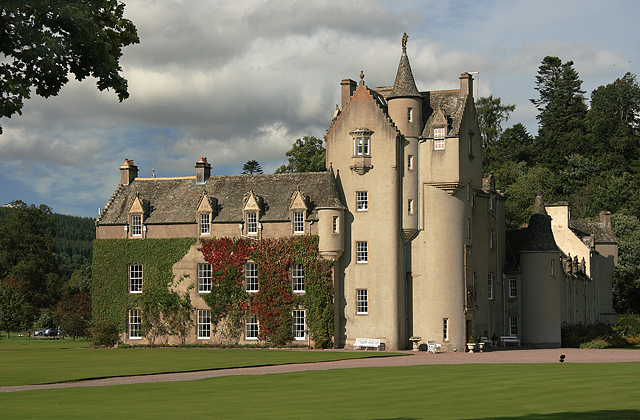
Ballindalloch Castle near the confluence of the River Avon and the River Spey

Stratha'an or Strathavon is the valley of the River Avon, (pronounced "River A'an"), in the Strathspey area of Moray, Scotland.

The upper reaches of the valley, which is 63.9 km (39.7 mi) long all told, (Note: The Gazetteer for Scotland has a length of 58km excluding the headwaters above Loch A'an.) are at Loch A'an in the heart of the Cairngorms National Park and the river only leaves the eastern edge of the Park about 10 kilometres (6.2 mi) from its confluence with the Spey near Ballindalloch. The largest settlement in the strath is the village of Tomintoul.

The geology of the area is much influenced by the Caledonian mountain building era that began during the Ordovician period nearly 500 million years ago.

Stratha'an as a provincial lordship was first recorded in the late 12th century. Map-making of the strath commenced in the late 16th century but it was not until the 19th century that truly accurate maps were created. Many of the place names are influenced by the Scottish Gaelic language. There are numerous archaeological sites listed by Historic Environment Scotland's database from both the historic and prehistoric eras along the whole length of the valley. Tourism, agriculture, forestry and whisky distilling dominate the local economy. Notable literary references include a poem Nan Shepherd wrote about Loch A'an in the 1930s.

The wildlife is fairly typical of the Cairngorms and surrounding area, although unusual in a UK context. For example, Britain's only free-ranging herd of reindeer roam on the hills in the upper strath. The vegetation of the middle reaches of the valley is dominated by the purple-flowering heather Calluna vulgaris.

== Etymology ==
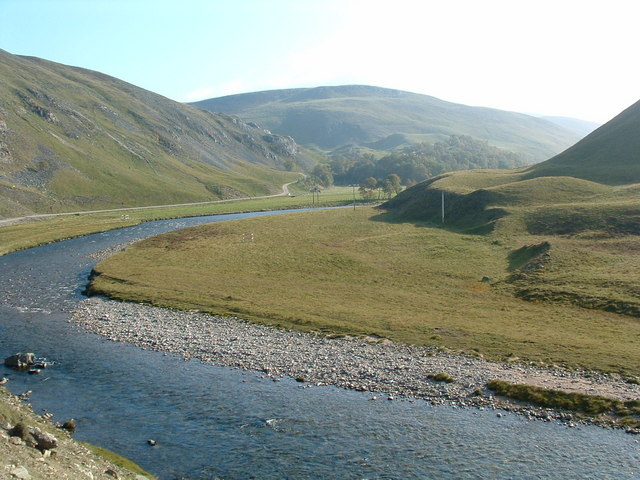
Looking towards Inchrory - "Roderick's meadow"

The names in the strath are influenced by Scottish Gaelic. In common with various other examples of "Avon", the river (and hence the strath) takes its name from the Gaelic abhainn meaning 'river' or 'stream'. The word, in common with the Welsh afon, is thought to originate from an early Indo-European root ab or aub or early British abone. Whatever the exact derivation, all agree that the name has the tautological meaning of "River River" and Strath A'an is thus "Valley of the River".

The village of Tomintoul is from Tom an t-Sabhail meaning "the hillock with the barn", the hamlet of Ballindalloch is Baile an Dalach meaning "the farm at the haugh" (a haugh being a low-lying meadow by a river) and Inchrory from Innis Ruairidh is "Roderick's meadow".

== Geology ==
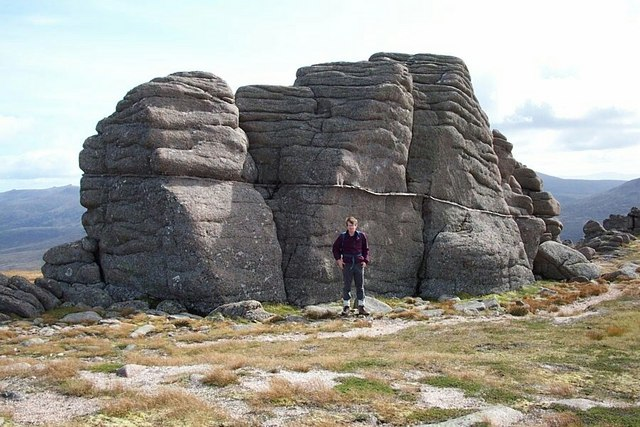
The "Little Barns of Bynack", a granite tor south of the summit of Bynack More

The majority of the rocks within the Cairngorms National Park belong to the Dalradian Supergroup, a thick sequence of sands, muds and limestones that were deposited between about 800 and 600 million years ago on the margins of the former continent of Laurentia. These rocks were intensely faulted, folded and metamorphosed during the Caledonian Orogeny between about 490 and 430 million years ago.

The subsequent collision of Baltica with Laurentia involved further folding and faulting of the Dalradian rock sequence and large plutons of granite rose up amongst the Dalradian rocks and then cooled in situ. The largest of these plutons is the granite mass which forms the Cairngorm mountains themselves. An outlier of Devonian Lower Old Red Sandstone occurs around the Tomintoul area and there is a small outcrop of limestone at Inchrory in Glen Avon.

The ice ages of the last 2.5 million years have left their mark both in terms of erosional and depositional features. The Cairngorm landscape displays a wide range of features associated with glaciation and periglaciation including corries and glacial troughs, moraines, kames, eskers and meltwater channels. One of the most significant glacial troughs is that of Loch A'an. Several of the mountains in the area - including Ben Mheadhoin, Bynack More and Ben Avon - have granite tors (known as "barns") in their upper reaches created by glacial processes.

== Geography ==
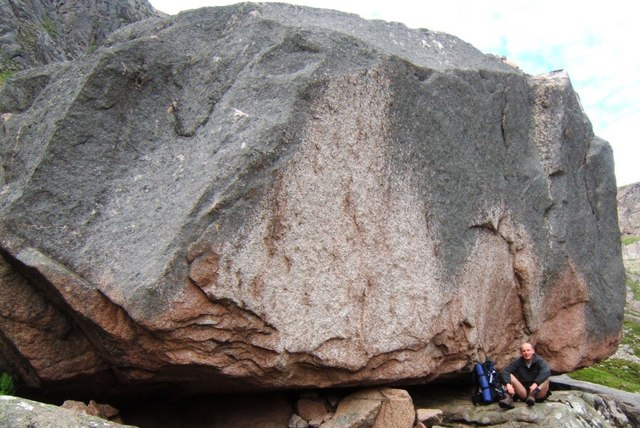
The Shelter Stone

The source of the River Avon is conventionally said to be Loch A'an situated between the mountains of Cairn Gorm and Ben Macdui. The headwaters of the strath are however the burns that tumble down from the summits of these two hills and from the 1,120 m (3,670 ft) Càrn Etchachan into Loch A'an. The river thus begins its journey in the heart of the Cairngorm Mountains which

are never wholly free from snow; the forests cannot extend themselves to a great height on their sides nor a tree rear its head within the region of the cold; even pasturage itself fails, and their rocky summits are covered with a downy coat of yellow sapless moss.

Lochan Buidhe is a small freshwater loch on the high plateau above Loch A'an situated at over 1,120 m (3,670 ft) above sea level that is the highest named body of water in the British Isles. The Feith Buidhe (Note: Buidhe means "yellow" and Fèith is "bog stream". The name is pronounced "fey boo-ee".) is a burn that flows from the lochan down the steep slopes near Hell's Lum Crag and into Loch A'an. The Feith Buidhe disaster occurred near the burn in November 1971. Six individuals, including five fifteen-year-old Edinburgh school students died of exposure when their group became stranded in the open for two nights in a blizzard. The tragedy is regarded as Britain's worst mountaineering accident.

On the lower slopes of Càrn Etchachan near the rivulet of Garbh Uisge Mhor a titanic block of granite called the Shelter Stone rests on some smaller boulders. There is a cramped space under the stone that can provide some respite from the elements. In the 1830s, the stone was described as being capable of containing 12 or 15 men. (Note: In 1872 the Shelter Stone was described by the Ordnance Survey as "a very large rock, which from natural causes appeared to have become separated from the craig above it, in rolling down the precipice its course has been arrested by two other large rocks, on the top of which it became fixed, forming a cave capable of containing several persons, this cave is frequently made use of during the Summer Season by Game-Keepers Tourists & as a habitation for an occasional night".)

=== Loch A'an ===
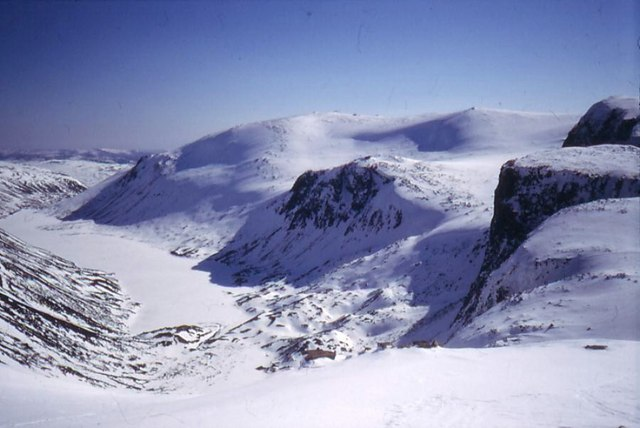
Loch A'an in springtime before the thaw

The loch is situated at an altitude of 725 m (2,379 ft) above sea level, has a mean depth of 7.8 m (26 ft) and extends to 56.5 ha (140 acres). It is oligotrophic in nature but despite the poor levels of nutrient it supports a variety of aquatic plant, invertebrate and fish species. Fish present include Arctic Charr and Brown Trout. The Cairngorms have diverse bryophyte habitats and important species include Andreaea frigida or icy rock moss, which is found on the margins of the loch and in the burns that feed it.

Significant examples of the semi-precious gemstone cairngorm have been found near the loch as well as blue topaz, and rare minerals appear in the granite bedrock such as chrysoberyl and columbite.

The Bathymetrical Survey of the Freshwater Lochs of Scotland, 1897-1909 by Sir John Murray and Lawrence Pullar provides comprehensive information for about 550 lochs. However a few significant ones, including Loch A'an, were omitted due to the difficulty in getting a boat to the site in order to carry out the survey. (Note: Others omitted in the Cairngorm region for the same reason include Loch Einich, Loch Etchachan and Lochnagar at the foot of the mountain that takes its name.) Nonetheless, in September 1861 Queen Victoria and Prince Albert visited Loch A'an on an outing from Balmoral Castle.

=== Glen Avon ===
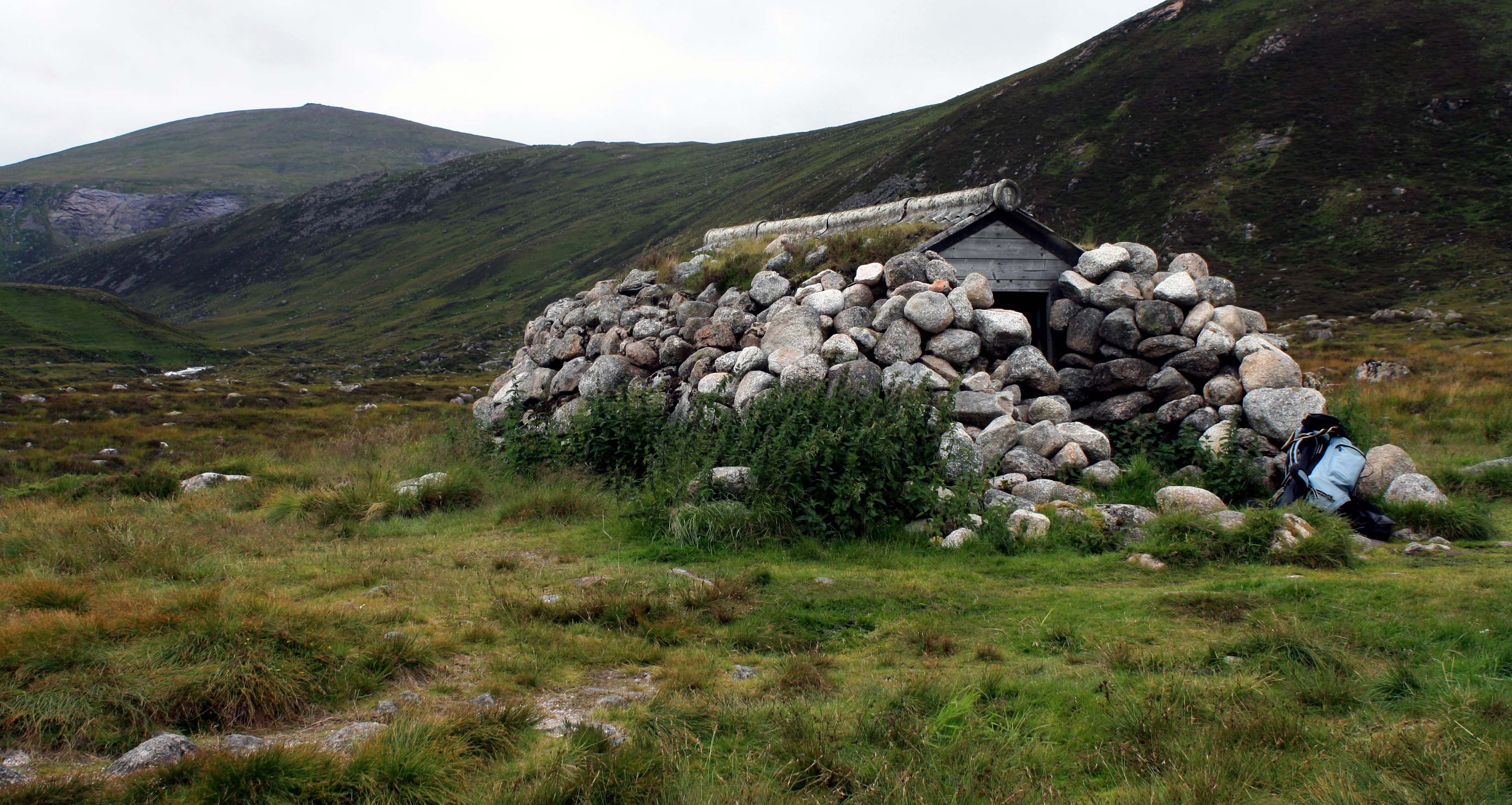
Fords of Avon refuge

The river exits the loch and flows east into Glen Avon to the north of Ben Mheadhoin, passing the Fords of Avon where there is a refuge hut maintained by the Mountaineering Council of Scotland. (Note: The purpose of the refuge, which was originally constructed in 1960, is as an emergency shelter for hill walkers, especially useful when the river is in spate and difficult to ford.) Just below the fords the river is joined by the small watercourse of Allt an t-Seallaidh that runs down from the Lairig an Laoigh pass.

About 6 km (3.7 mi) from the fords is the next building in the glen - the Faindouran Lodge bothy. The river is joined by numerous small tributaries as it wends its way eastwards through the Forest of Glenavon to the north of Beinn a' Bhùird and Ben Avon. The most notable of these watercourses to join the river are the Burn of Loin and the Builg Burn originating at Loch Builg. The latter flows down Glen Builg to enter the Avon on its right bank just downstream of the Linn of Avon falls. The area is devoid of permanent habitation and the first stand of trees is encountered at Inchrory, a shooting lodge some 14 km (8.7 mi) west of the fords. The lodge is part of the 17,000 ha (42,000 acres) Glenavon estate owned by a reclusive Malaysian businessman. Here the river turns sharply northwards.

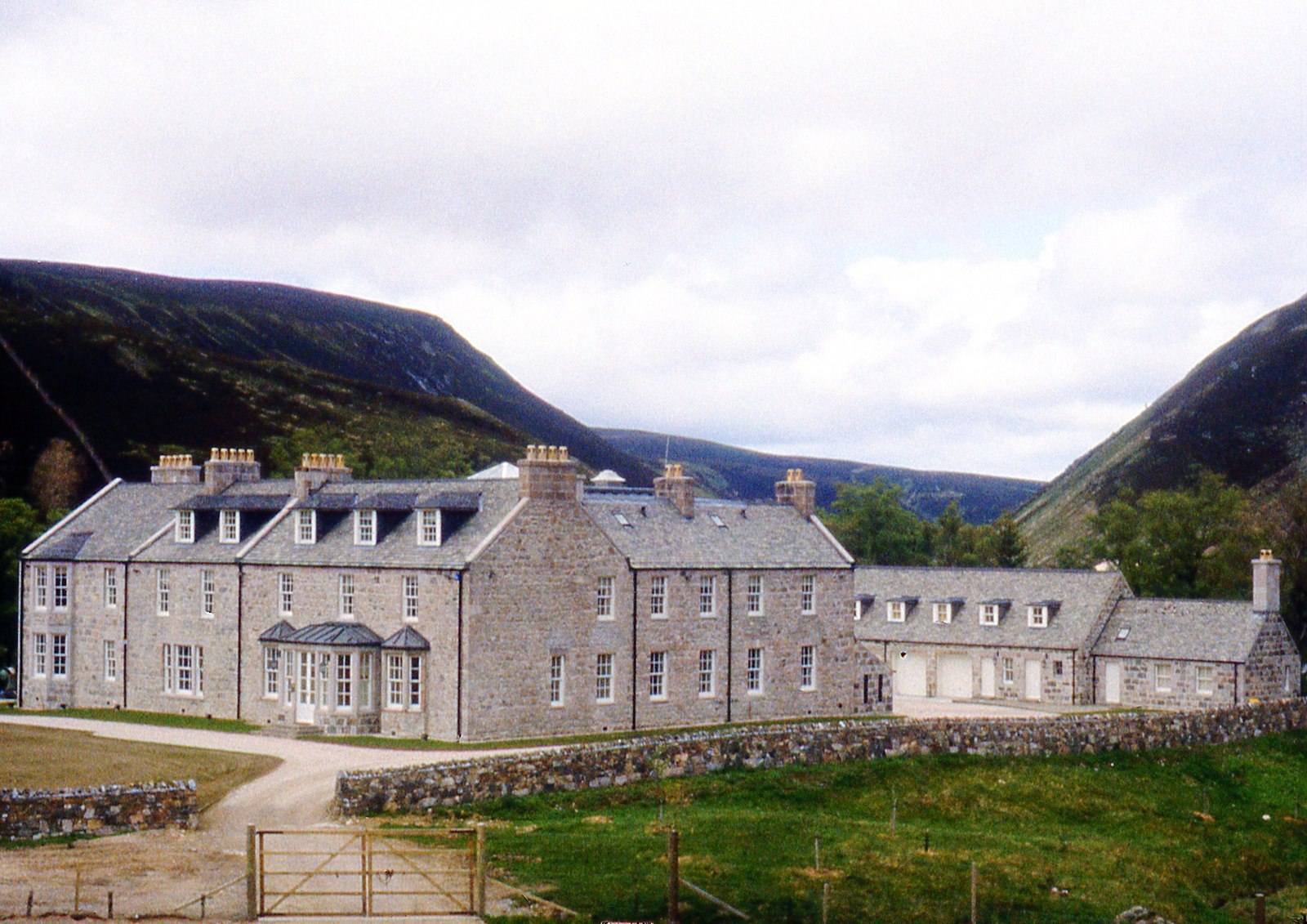
Inchrory shooting lodge

This change of direction is due to the ice-age glaciers cutting through the pre-glacial watershed causing the headwaters of the Avon to be diverted - a process of river capture that resulted in the upper Avon flowing into the Spey rather than due east into Strathdon.

The narrow glen becomes wooded after about 5 km (3.1 mi) and here the river is joined by the Muckle Fergie Burn from the east. A kilometre later it reaches the farm of Birchfield and at this point the valley widens and becomes the strath proper.

=== The main strath ===
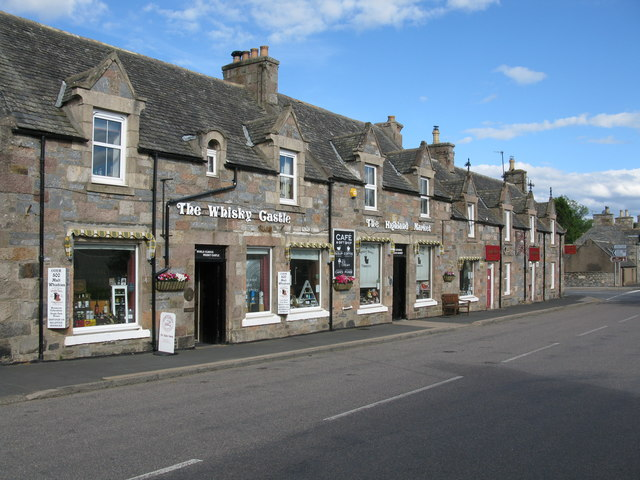
The Main Street of Tomintoul

The farm of Delnabo sits on the west bank of the river at its confluence with the Water of Ailnack, which enters the strath from the confines of a precipitous gorge - the higher reaches of this watercourse are known as the Water of Caiplich. The farm is overlooked by the Queens Cairn viewpoint and is served by a metalled road which crosses the river and continues in a northeasterly direction to the village of Tomintoul, the largest settlement in the strath. Located in the parish of Kirmichael, the village's population was 322 at the time of the 2001 census. At 355 m (1,165 ft) it is the highest village in the Highlands.

The A939 crosses the river at the old Bridge of Avon and a surfaced road, the B9136, follows the river's course downstream. The strath is much more thickly wooded from this point on. The Conglass Water originating at the Lecht, enters the Avon from the east and the Burn of Lochy enters from Glen Lochy to the west. Above Bridge of Brown the Lochy is fed in turn by the Burn of Brown. Tomintoul distillery, founded in 1964 and which produces malt whisky bottled as a single malt, is located in this part of the strath. The lowermost tributary of the Avon is the River Livet which enters from Glenlivet on the right bank at Drumin just as the Avon leaves the national park. The ruins of the fourteenth century Drumin Castle overlook the confluence of the two rivers.

The river and the B road run parallel to one another as they approach Bridge of Avon on the A95 trunk road and the settlement of Ballindalloch under the heights of Ben Rinnes. Ballindalloch Castle is a significant visitor attraction, and there are three distilleries in the area – Cragganmore, Tormore, and Ballindalloch, the last of which operates from the castle's estate farm. The River Aa'n reaches journey's end here as it joins the River Spey in the castle grounds.

== Cartography ==
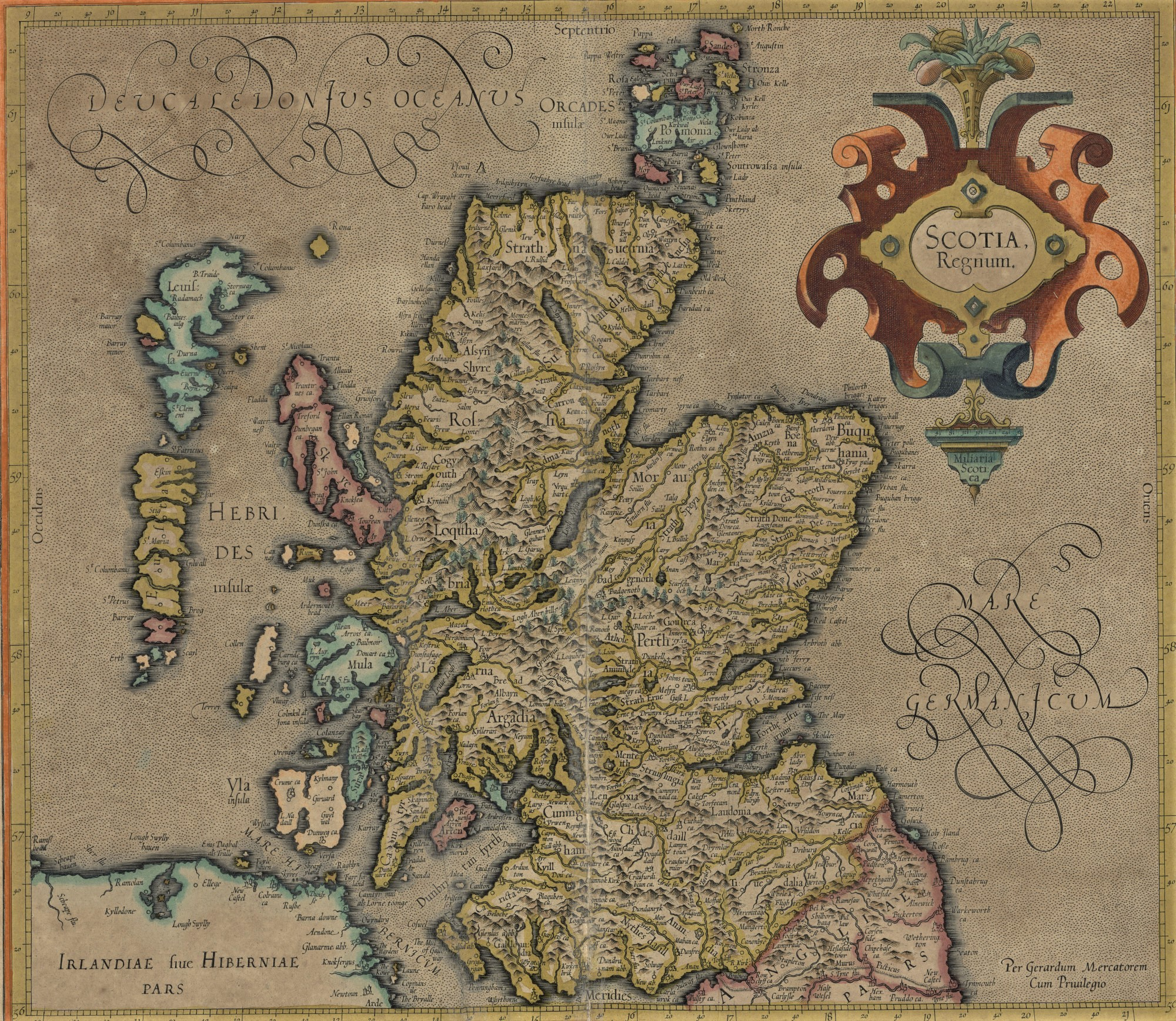
Mercator's 1595 map Scotia Regnum

One of first maps covering the area in any detail was created by Gerardus Mercator in 1595, which became the main basis for maps of Scotland until the mid-17th century. The map shows the Ava flu. flowing parallel to Strath Spey in the west and joining the River Spey south of Rothes and below the Spey's confluence with the Fiddy flu. (i.e. the River Fiddich). The Ava flu. rises at a large body of water in the Cairngorms described on the map as Anan.

The 1654 Blaeu Atlas of Scotland (the fifth volume of the Atlas Maior) that was published in Amsterdam by Johan Blaeu drew on earlier work by Timothy Pont created c. 1583-96. Pont's map refers to "Strath Avin" and Loch Builg is shown prominently. There are two notes on this map above Byn Bynick (i.e. Bynack More): "Soulichin Bin Avin a great wildernes rich in Deer" and "The loch of Avin far furthir out [th]en [th]is be 5 mylles". Blaeu's map also incorporates amendments to Pont's work by Robert Gordon of Straloch. The Pont-Gordon-Blaeu map shows "Loch Avin" near the "Mountains of Bin Avin" and mentions "Inche Roarie", Delnabo, "Kirk Michael" and various other downstream places including "Ballindallach" where the Avon is correctly shown joining the Spey. However the course of the "Avin fl." is displayed as running in a gentle curve from southwest to north and none of the major upstream changes of direction are included.

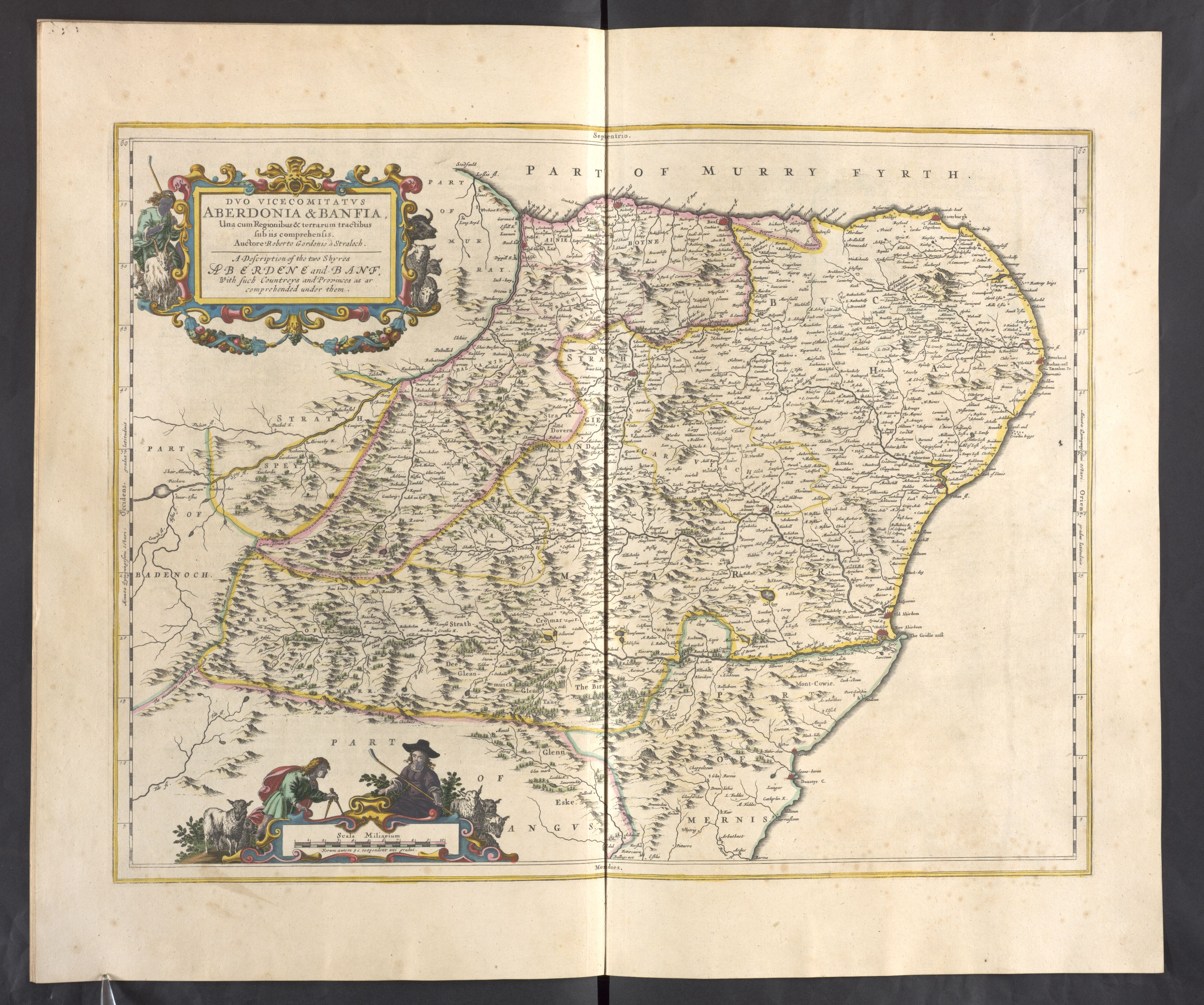
"Dvo Vicecomitatvs Aberdonia & Banfia" from the Blaeu Atlas of Scotland by Johan Blaeu

Many innovations in map-making in Scotland, as elsewhere in Europe, were as a result of military imperatives. However, the mapping that accompanied military engineering works in the time of the Rough Wooing of the 1540s and Cromwell's Protectorate of the 1650s had little requirement for more detailed cartography in areas outside their immediate interest such as Strath A'an. In the aftermath of the Jacobite Rebellion of 1745 William Roy was commissioned to undertake a military survey. However, the work was more one of "rapid reconnaissance rather than a measured topographic survey". The resulting map of the Highlands shows a much more accurate rendition of the course of Strath Aa'n and the nature of the surrounding hills but there is otherwise little additional detail.

The creation of the Ordnance Survey in the 19th century led to much more detailed mapping and those maps becoming standard usage in rural land-use management. The Ordnance Survey of Scotland First Series, Sheet 75 - "Tomintoul" dating from the mid-19th century shows much of the topographical detail of the upper glen and settlement detail in the lower strath that modern maps produced by the OS have today. However, the Survey's choices as to what was included and its "relative blindness to antiquities, variant spellings, placenames and to archaeological phenomena before the 1920s" alongside the relative lack of detailed mapping of much of Highland Scotland meant that this series painted a "selective description of the countryside" until the 1:50,000 series emerged in the 1970s.

== Natural history ==
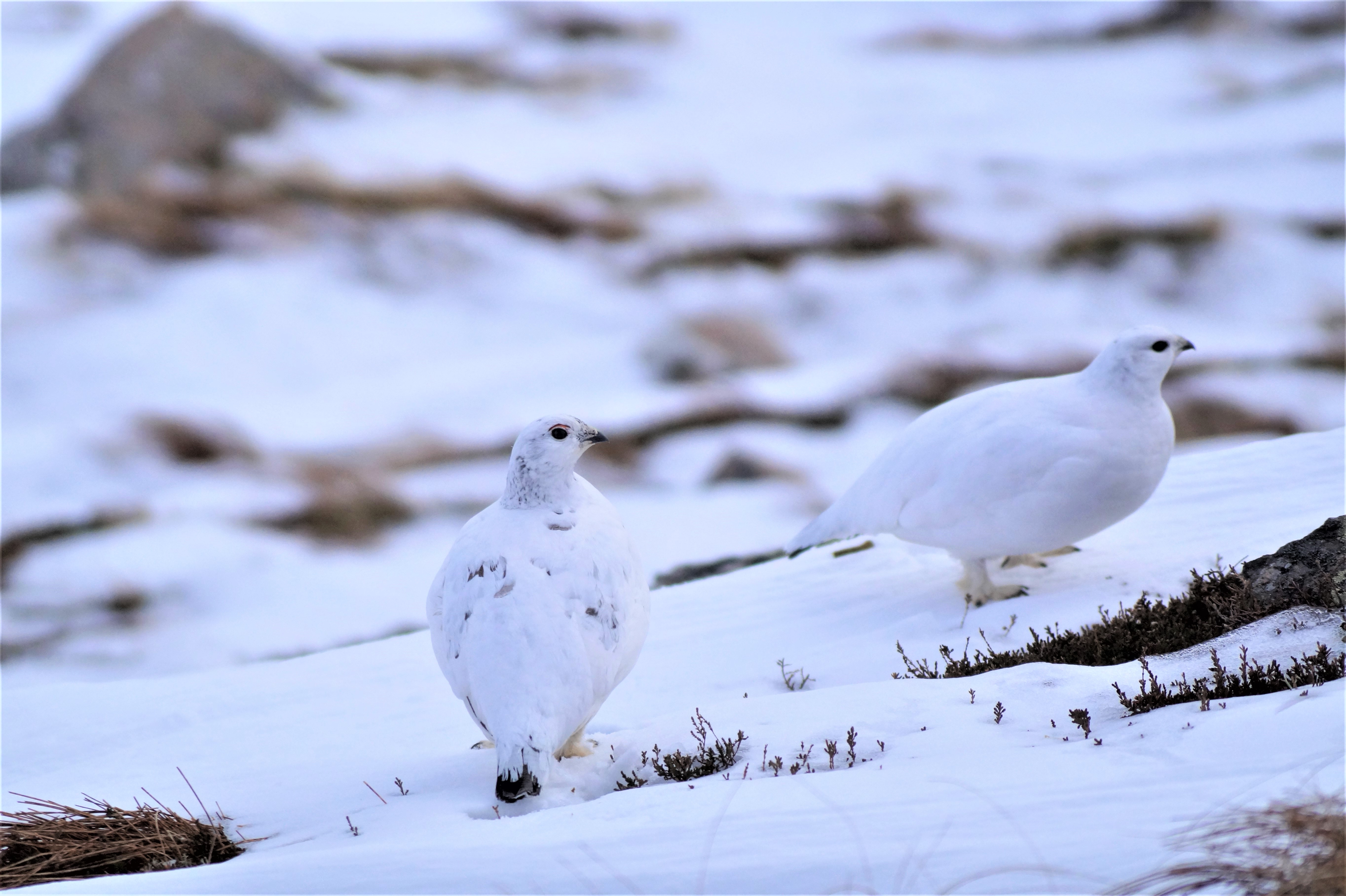
Ptarmigan in winter

Mammalian wildlife is fairly typical of the Cairngorms and surrounding area, although unusual in a UK context. The upper strath is populated by red and roe deer and mountain hares. Foxes, moles, otter, and water voles are also found there. The lower strath has all of the above plus a mixture of woodland and lowland creatures including red squirrels, rabbits, pine martens, wild cats and Daubenton's bats. Attempts have been made to eradicate the invasive American mink with a consequent rise in the water vole population. Wild boar have been recorded on occasion. Action to prevent the spread of grey squirrels into the National Park and beyond has been successful with 2016 records in the northeast confined to a few small areas close to Aberdeen.

About 150 semi-domestic reindeer roam free on the hills above the Reindeer Centre in Glenmore although they are not considered wild. They are Britain's only free-ranging herd of the species.

Avian species regularly seen in the upper strath include dotterel and ptarmigan. Rare breeding species here include the golden eagle and snow bunting. Ravens, once common in Moray are now scarce due to persecution, with a pair seen near Loch A'an in the 1960s and another pair nesting in the Ailnack gorge in 1974. As for mammals, there is a greater diversity of species in the lower strath. There are 18 species of raptor found in the moors and forests of the National Park and (for example) dippers and grey wagtails can be seen by the river banks in the lower reaches. Locally important species include the capercaillie and the crested tit.

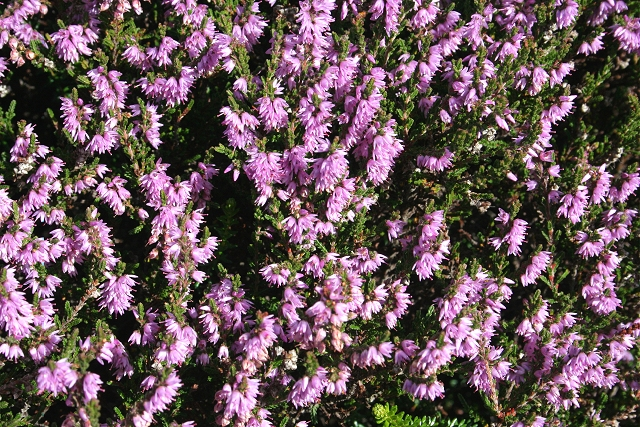
Calluna vulgaris, the purple heather of Scotland

The common frog and common toad are widely distributed in the Cairngorms although the latter are largely absent from the glen above Tomintoul. Adders and common lizards are found in various suitable locations in the strath. Slow worms, the rarest of Scotland's three reptile species, are locally abundant at Ballindalloch.

Atlantic salmon and brown trout exist in all of the major catchments in the Cairngorms area, with the former being the most important to the angling economy. The Avon supports some of the highest altitude salmon in Scotland with juvenile fish being found at heights greater than 600 m (2,000 ft) above sea level. Brook lamprey and river lampreys are found in the river further downstream as, in the past, were freshwater pearl mussels.

The flora of the Cairngorms exists in four different zones. In the A'an watershed the high montane area, which is dominated by grasses, rushes, sedges, mosses and lichens is limited to the high plateaux above Loch A'an and of the surrounding hills such as Ben Avon. The low montane zone between 650 m (2,130 ft) and 900 m (3,000 ft) exists in the valley upstream from close to the Fords of Avon and the lower slopes surrounding the loch. A relatively rich acidic flora exists under the cliffs at the head of Loch A'an including downy willow, arctic mouse-ear, alpine speedwell and starwort mouse-ear. More generally this zone comprises dwarf-shrub heaths and moss heaths, the former being dominated by the heather Calluna vulgaris which exists in abundance in areas above 250 m (820 ft) and below 900 m – essentially the entire length of the strath save for the lower course downstream of Glenlivet and the high plateau. Between the low montane area and the forest zone is the submontane zone which is made up of heather moor, juniper, scrub, grasslands and wet heath. Birch species, Scots Pine, juniper and willow species are the principal trees found growing naturally in the forest zone itself below about 600 m (2,000 ft).

== Prehistory ==
There are numerous archaeological sites listed by Historic Environment Scotland from both the historic and prehistoric eras along the length of the strath some of which are included below.

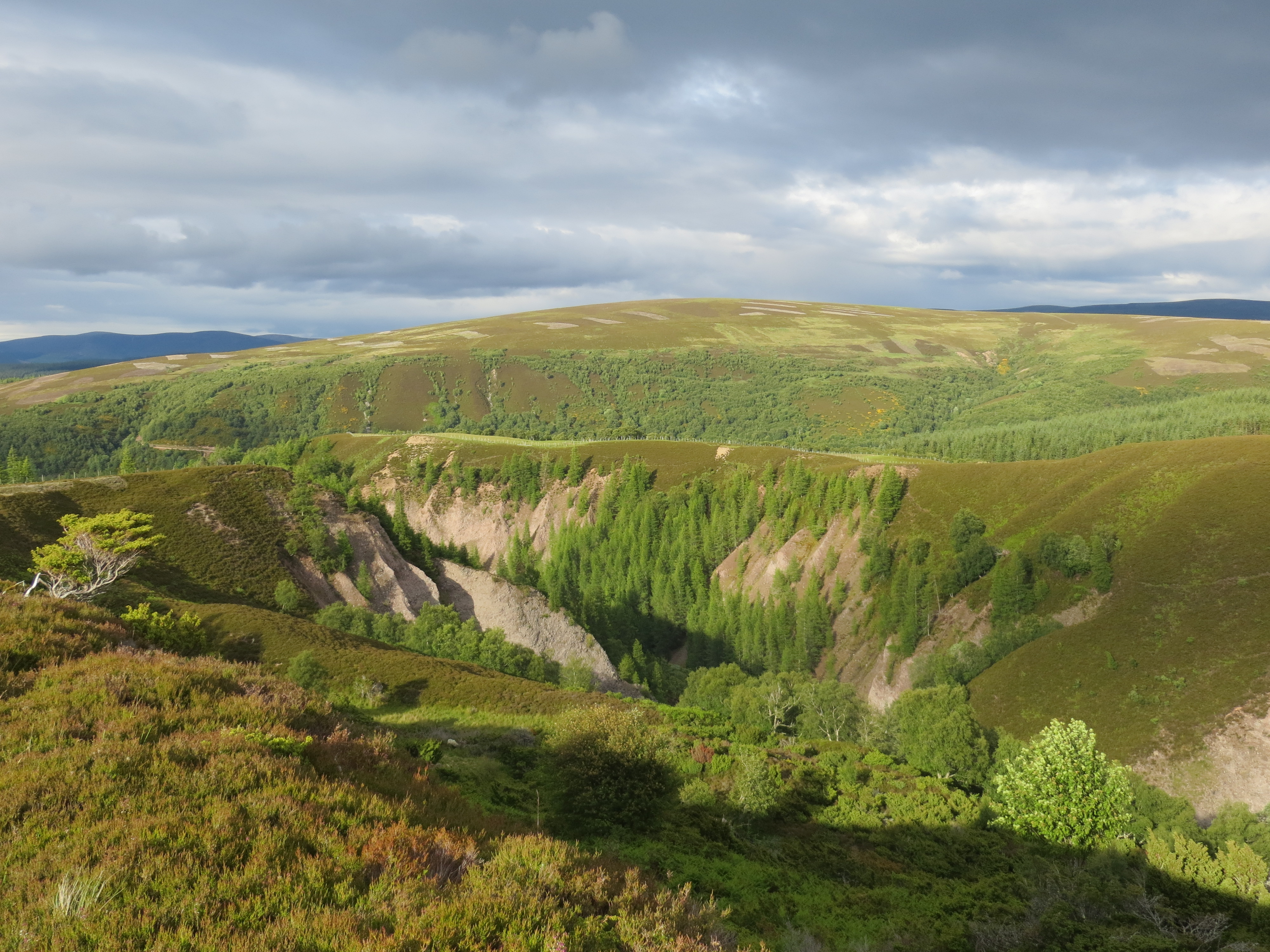
The Water of Ailnack gorge looking towards Uaigh Sheumas an Tuim

A barbed bone point from the Mesolithic period has been recovered from a peat moss in Glen Avon suggesting the presence of a hunting party in this area at this time. Other finds dating from the Neolithic and Bronze Age have also been found there. These include two flint arrowheads: a leaf-shaped one from the Neolithic and the other a barbed-and-tanged one from the early Bronze Age. These artefacts suggest that this was a period when game hunting would have supplemented farming.

The remains of an early Bronze Age Clava-type cairn measuring about 14 m (46 ft) in diameter are situated at Marionburgh just west of the River Avon at Ballindalloch. The cairn would once have been surrounded by a circle of up to eleven standing stones but only five now remain. A leaf-shaped bronze spearhead of late Bronze Age date was found near Inverlochy farm further up the strath and purchased by the National Museum of Antiquities in 1938.

== History ==
=== Medieval period ===
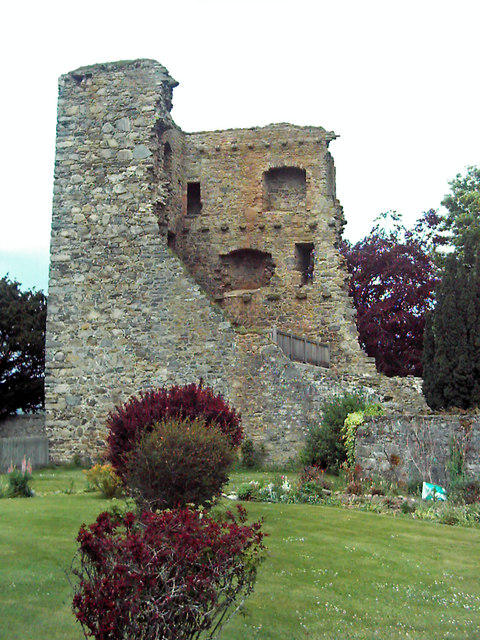
The ruins of Drumin Castle

Stratha'an was a provincial lordship first recorded between 1194 and 1198, and it was coextensive with the parishes of Kirkmichael and Inveravon.

The Lordship of Stratha'an may have been acquired c. 1190 by Earl Duncan of Fife, and commemorated by the naming of Ben MacDui on the lordship's western boundary (Scottish Gaelic: Beinn Mac Duibh, lit. 'MacDuff's Mountain') after the Earl's kindred Clan MacDuff, though the existence of a burn called Allt an Gille Mícheil on the south eastern boundary of the lordship may commemorate the earlier Earl Gille Míchéil, suggesting the lordship may have been associated with the Earls of Fife as early as the period of the defeat of Oengus of Moray at the Battle of Stracathro in 1130. The relationship between the lordship and the Earls of Fife was certainly well-established by 1214, when Earl Malcolm granted the church of St. Peter of Inveravon to the Diocese of Moray "with all the parish of the whole of Stratha'an", and the Earls' lordship was described as being held "in ancient times" in a charter of Robert I dated between 1315 and 1329.

Drumin Castle at the foot of Glenlivet may have been erected by the Wolf of Badenoch. Two walls remain to a height of four storeys but although it was an impressive fortification its habitable phase was fairly short-lived. After it was sold to the 3rd Earl of Huntly it became derelict in the sixteenth century. Uaigh Sheumas an Tuim is the name of a cave on the side of hill called Tom an Rèisg near Birchfield that is associated with James Grant of Carron who is "locally believed" to have taken refuge there in the mid-17th century after a dispute with the Grants of Ballindalloch. Subsequent erosion has left little visible at this site. Another story about "James-au-Tuam" as he became known, is that after being imprisoned in Edinburgh Castle he escaped by using ropes smuggled into his prison in a cask of butter.

The remains of a chapel, well and burial ground exist on the west bank of the A'n just south of the junction with Glenlivet. The chapel measures about 11.5m by 4m. Although there are no surviving traces of any graves the presence of several headstones was recorded in the late 18th century.

=== Modern period ===
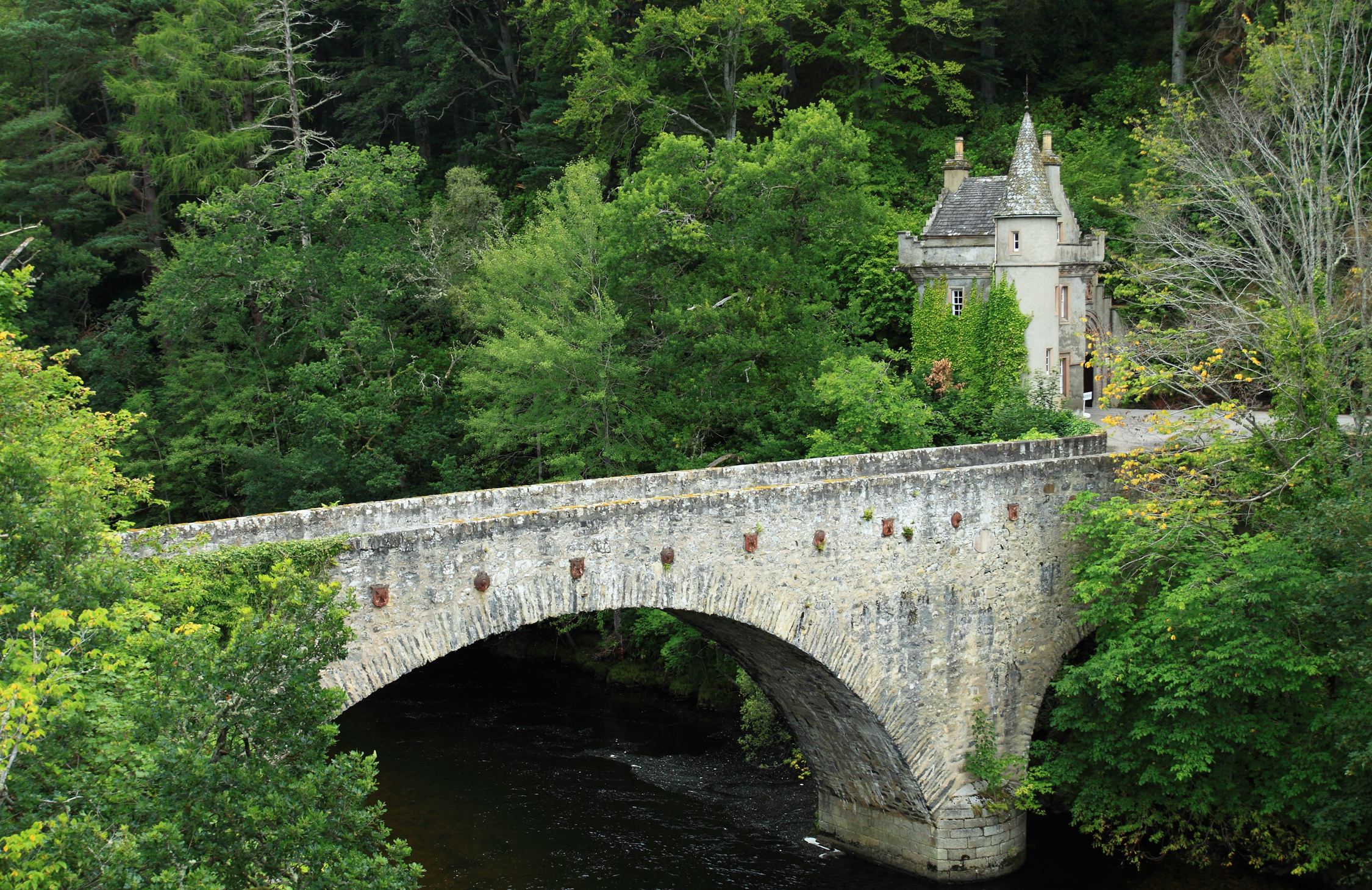
The Old Bridge of Avon, opened in 1800

In the early modern period Ballindalloch Castle became the family home of the Macpherson-Grant family and has remained in their hands for nearly five centuries. In the late eighteenth century the "exterior of the building and the artificial embellishment of the natural beauties, bespeak it the residence of opulence united with the most correct taste". The author of this section of the Old Statistical Account added that "by the history of Scotland in all ages, it is certain that there has been no period in which the people, high or low, of every rank, led their lives in more secure or more comfortable circumstances."

In the eighteenth century access to the English markets, gave a considerable momentum to the export of black cattle from northern Scotland. At this time a cattle droving route existed through Strathspey, up Strath A'an and then on to Corgarff in Strathdon and Ballater on Deeside or through the Lairig an Laoigh to Braemar.

The village of Tomintoul was laid out on a grid pattern by Alexander Gordon, 4th Duke of Gordon in 1776. It followed the construction of a military road by William Caulfeild, now the A939. The duke's motivation for his efforts was the hope that a permanent settlement would minimise cattle theft and illegal distilling of spirits in the area. Estimates suggest that in the early 1700s there had been up to 200 illicit stills in the Glenlivet, with spirits smuggled out over the Ladder Hills. By 1798 there were 37 families living in the village but "no manufacture" and "only some necessary articles of merchandise retailed".

Clach Bhàn is natural outcrop of rock on the west bank of the River Avon between Inchrory and Birchfield. The names means "stone woman" and an 18th century record states that in the past the site was visited by pregnant women, who travelled long distances to visit it in the hope that they would be granted a painless labour. In 1798 the parish of Inveravon was populated by 1,394 members of the Church of Scotland and 850 Roman Catholics (described as "the only dissenters" there). The figures for Kirkmichael parish were 892 and 384 respectively.

The oldest "Bridge of Avon" is situated just north of Tomintoul and once carried the Coupar Angus to Fort George military road over the river. Built in 1754 by the 33rd Regiment of Foot it no longer carries the main road over the Avon having been bypassed by a modern bridge. At the head of Strath Avon near Ballindalloch is the Old Bridge of Avon which was opened in 1800 and is now only used for pedestrian traffic. A plaque marks the highest point reached by the river during the Muckle Spate of 1829, which raised the water level by 7m. The main A95 road now crosses the river via a concrete bridge constructed in the late 20th century situated just 50 m to the southwest.

Ballindalloch railway station opened in 1863 and was part of the Strathspey Railway (GNoSR) until its closure in 1965. The station building was used as a hostel for walkers and cyclists navigating the Speyside Way that runs along the line of the dismantled railway but is now a private house.

== Literature ==
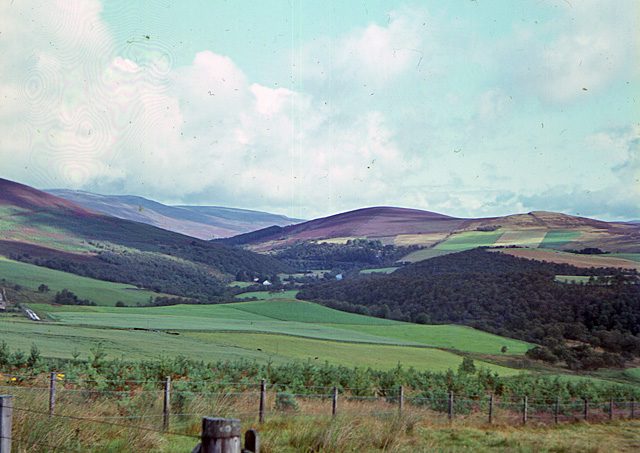
"The middle reaches, where the hills are friendly rather than fearsome"

Nan Shepherd wrote a short poem in praise of Loch A'an in her 1934 anthology In the Cairngorms.

Loch A’an, Loch A’an, hoo deep ye lie!
Tell nane yer depth and nane shall I.
Bricht though yer deepmaist pit may be,
Ye’ll haunt me till the day I dee.
Bricht, an’ bricht, an’ bricht as air,
Ye’ll haunt me noo for evermair.

In the 1920s Sir Henry Alexander wrote:

The Avon, regarded from the point of view of river and mountain scenery, is perhaps the most perfect Glen in Scotland. For in the whole 38 miles, from its source above Loch Avon, to the Spey, there is not a single dour passage, and every phase of highland landscape is presented. From the wild barren grandeur of Ben Macdhui to the luxuriant beaches of Dalnashaugh, under whose shade the river flows deep and dark to meet the Spey. It is rash to discriminate among the beautys of such a glen, but perhaps not the least attractive are those in the middle reaches, where the hills are friendly rather than fearsome, where groves of silver birches break and soften the valley side, where the alder dips its branches in the singing water, and where the oyster-catcher sweeps and cries above the shingle. (Note: This quotation by Sir Henry Alexander (20 June 1875 – 7 April 1940), Editor of the Aberdeen Free Press, Lord Provost of Aberdeen 1932-1935, is probably from the SMC's 1931 Guide Book to the Cairngorms that he authored or the Cairngorm Club Journal that he edited from 1924-26.)

== Tourism and recreation ==
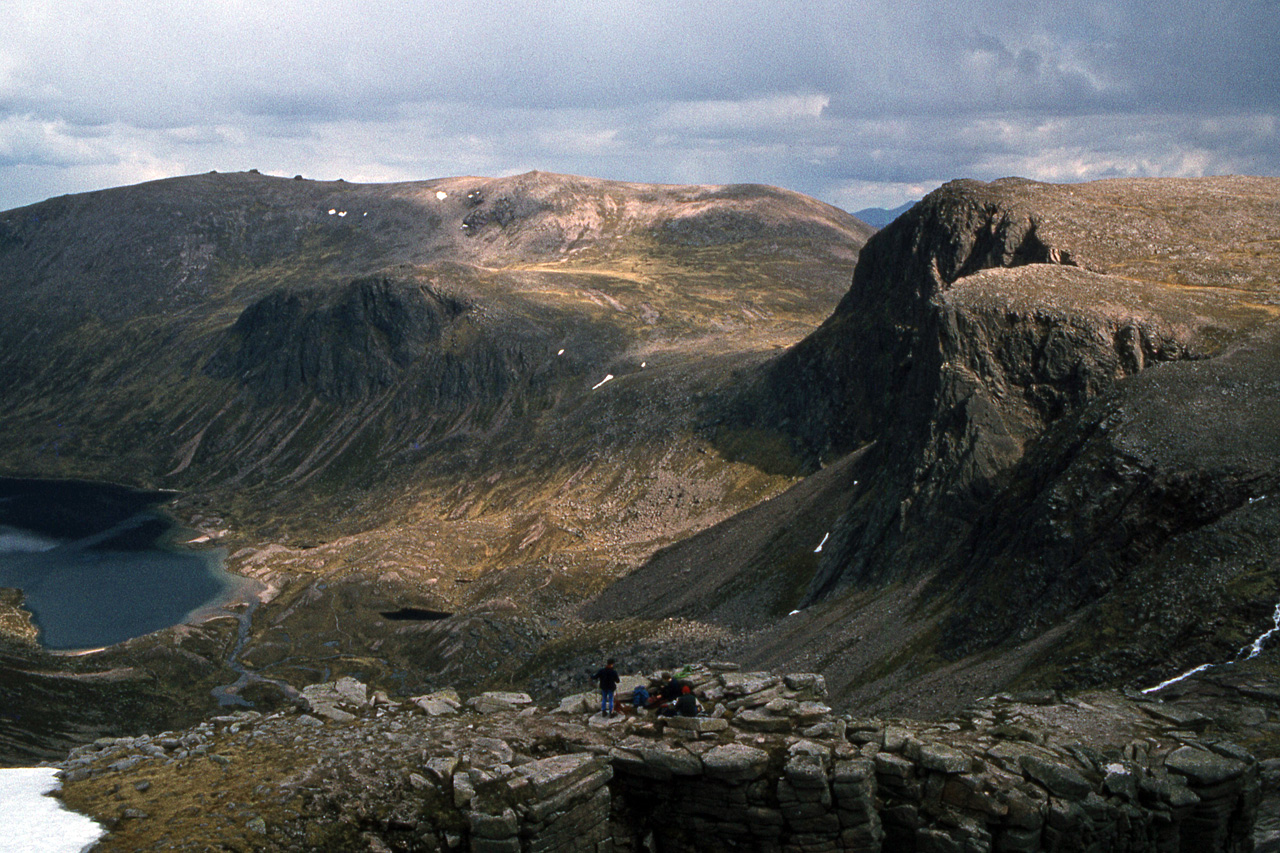
The view from the top of Hell's Lum Crag with Shelter Stone Crag at right, Càrn Etchachan to the crag's left and then Stacan Dubha above Loch A'an with the heights of Beinn Mheadhoin beyond

Tourism accounts for 30% of the economy and 43% of employment of the national park. However, the remoteness of the upper Glen Aa'n is such that the direct impact of tourism here is largely limited to shooting on estates such as Inchrory, hillwalking and rock-climbing. For example, the Scottish Mountaineering Club guide to the Munros suggests routes to all the hills at the head of the glen either via the Linn of Dee to the south east or from Glenmore to the north rather than taking the long trek up Glen A'an from Birchfield (where there is a locked gate on the track). Similarly, the recommended approach to Beinn a' Bhùird is from Deeside with only Ben Avon being close enough to Tomintoul to offer a short route from that direction.

There are several challenging rock climbs at the head of Loch A'an. Hell's Lum Crag, (Note: "Lum" is a Scots word for chimney.) Shelter Stone Crag and Stac an Fharaidh offer a wide array of climbs with varying grades.

Further downstream Tomintoul has a variety of hotels, restaurants and shops and the River Avon Fishing Association promotes fishing along the river. The offer two beats: Richmond runs from the junction of the Avon with the Conglass Water downstream to the Tomintoul Distillery while the Gordon beat lies above the confluence with the River Livet.

The Glenlivet Estate is part of Crown Estate Scotland which acquired the property of 23,000 hectares (57,000 acres) in 1937. It has over 30 farms, 3,500 hectares (8,600 acres) of commercial forests and substantial moorland. The estate, part of which is in Strath A'an, operates a ranger service and visitor centre and has a network of walking trails.
