= Beinn Bhreac (Glen Derry) =

Twin-peaked mountain in Scotland

Coordinates: 57.055221°N 3.553316°W

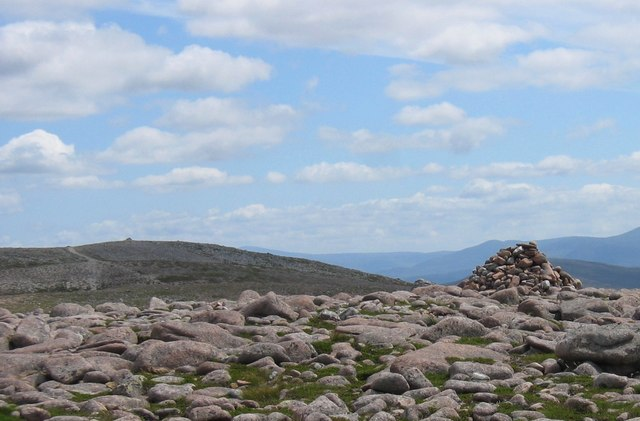
- Twin tops of Beinn Bhreac, looking east past the lower top to the taller summit.

Highest point
- Elevation: 931 m (3,054 ft)
- Prominence: 86 m (282 ft)
- Listing: Munro

Naming
- English translation: Speckled Hill
- Language of name: Gaelic

Geography
- Location: Braemar, Scotland
- OS grid: NO05889709
- Topo map: OS Landranger 36, 43.

Climbing
- Easiest route: Hike

Beinn Bhreac is a twin-peaked Scottish mountain located above Glen Derry in the Cairngorm Mountains approximately 11 kilometres (7 mi) north-west of Braemar.

== Overview ==
Beinn Bhreac is a remote mountain located at the southern end of a featureless, boggy moorland plateau called the Moine Bhealaidh (Yellow Moss in Gaelic). The eastern peak is 4 metres (13 ft) higher than the western peak. It is commonly approached from the Linn of Dee to the south and is often combined with the neighbouring Munro Beinn a' Chaorainn. From its summit there are extensive views to the surrounding giants of the Cairngorm Mountains including Ben MacDui, Great Britain's second highest mountain. It is a very serene location.

== Geography ==
At 931 metres (3,054 ft) Beinn Bhreac is a Munro and is ranked as the 249th highest mountain in Scotland. The mountain has two peaks, the eastern one of which is 4 metres (13 ft) higher than the western peak and therefore the summit. The mountain is bounded by Dubh Ghleann to the East and Glen Derry to the West. Both of these sides are steep and rocky in places. Moderately inclined slopes on its south-western side lead down towards Derry Lodge. The boggy moorland plateau called the Moine Bhealaidh extends to the north-west from Beinn Bhreac and links it with the neighbouring peak of Beinn a' Chaorainn. The view from the summit gives a fine panorama and takes in all the Cairngorm giants including Ben MacDui to the west and Beinn a' Bhuird to the east.

== Ascent ==
A popular route of ascent for Beinn Bhreac is from the Linn of Dee National Trust for Scotland car park (NO065901), 8 kilometres (5 mi) west of Braemar. The route follows the estate road along Glen Lui for 5 kilometres (3 mi) to Derry Lodge: bicycles can be used on this stretch of the route and secured in the woodland around Derry Lodge for collection on the return journey. The route then goes north up Glen Derry for 2 kilometres (1 mi) before ascending the south-western flanks of Beinn Bhreac. From the bealach between Meall an Lundain and Beinn Bhreac it is a steep climb to the summit.

An approach from the Aviemore side of the Cairngorms is feasible, starting at the Cairn Gorm ski centre, but this involves crossing or bypassing Cairn Gorm, Loch Avon, Beinn Mheadhoin and Beinn a' Chaorainn before reaching the mountain and is a long, hard walk.

Beinn Bhreac is a remote mountain and is therefore often climbed in combination with its neighbouring Munro Beinn a' Chaorainn which is located approximately 4 kilometres (2 mi) to the north across the Moine Bhealaidh plateau.
