= Beinn a' Chaorainn (Cairngorms) =

Scottish mountain in the heart of the Cairngorms range

Coordinates: 57.0939°N 3.5764°W

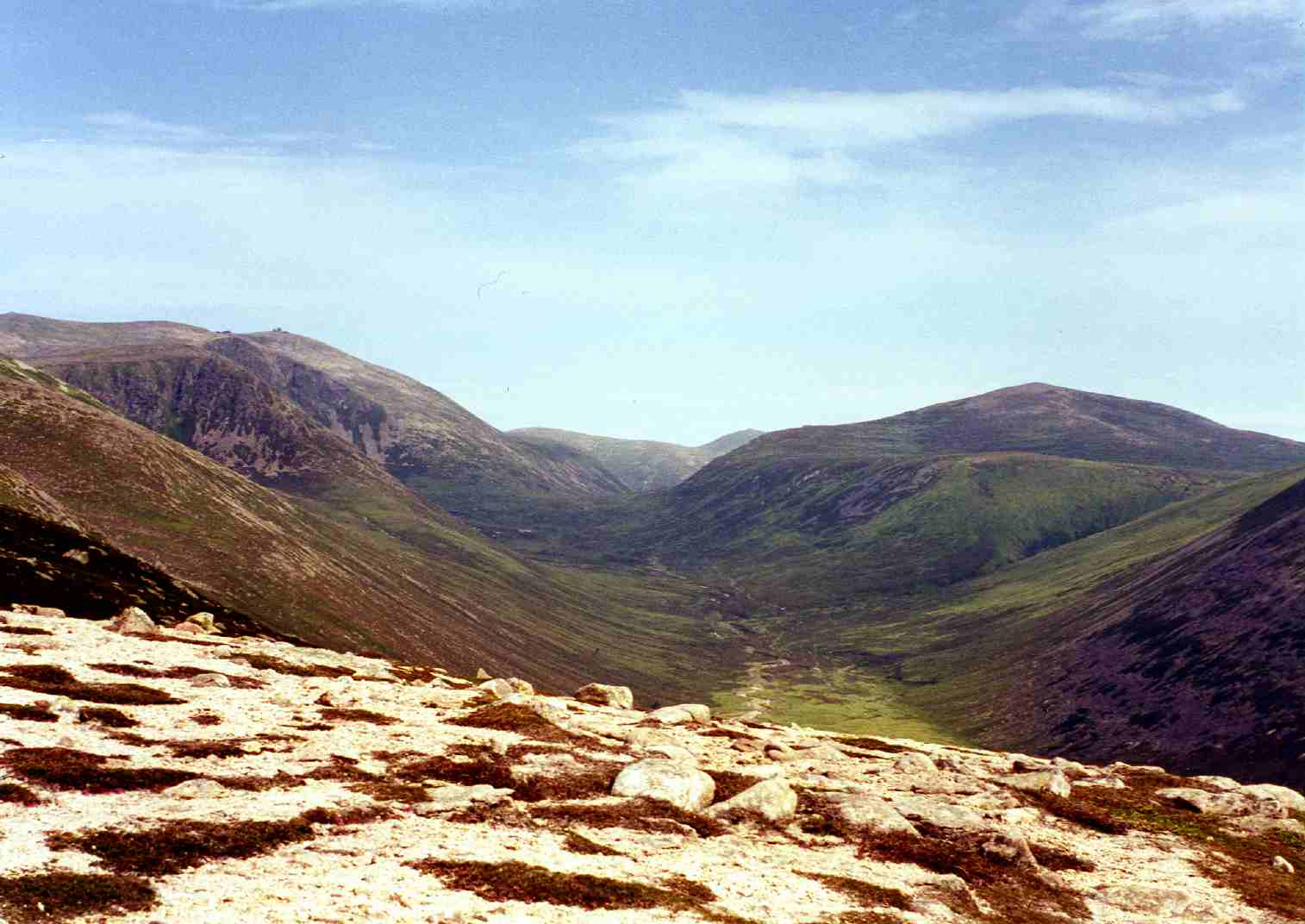
- Looking up Glen Derry from the slopes of Derry Cairngorm with Beinn a' Chaorainn (right) and Beinn Mheadhoin (left).

Highest point
- Elevation: 1,083 m (3,553 ft)
- Prominence: 245 m (804 ft)
- Parent peak: Beinn a' Bhuird
- Listing: Munro, Marilyn

Naming
- English translation: Mountain of the Rowan Tree
- Language of name: Gaelic
- Pronunciation: Scottish Gaelic: [ˈpeiɲ ə ˈxɯːɾɛɲ]

Geography
- Location within Scotland
- Location: Cairngorms, Scotland
- Parent range: Grampians
- OS grid: NJ044013
- Topo map: OS Landranger 36, OS Explorers 404, 403

Listed summits of Beinn a' Chaorainn (Cairngorms)
Name	Grid ref	Height	Status
Beinn a' Chaorainn Bheag	NJ057017	1,017 m (3,337 ft)	Munro Top

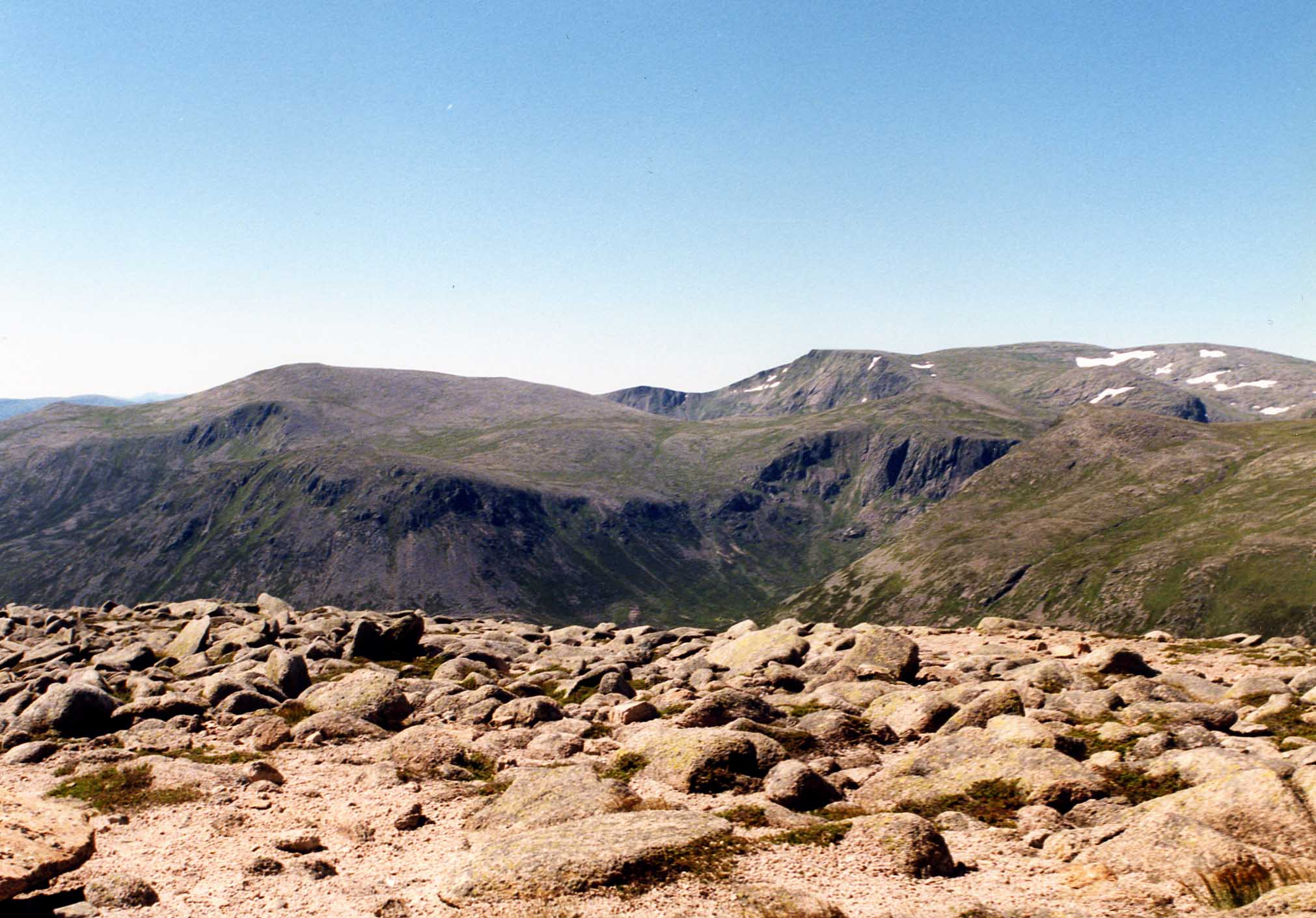
Looking SW from the summit to Derry Cairngorm and Ben Macdui.

Beinn a' Chaorainn is a Scottish mountain in the heart of the Cairngorms range. It is quite a remote hill, being located roughly 19 kilometres south east of Aviemore and 14 kilometres north west of Braemar. The mountain stands on the border of the Moray and Aberdeenshire council areas. The hill's name used to be spelt as Beinn a' Chaoruinn, but the spelling of the word caorunn (in genitive case here) was altered to caorann by the Gaelic Orthographic Convention's attempts to standardise spelling.

== Overview ==
The mountain is a pointed hill, however it is not particularly conspicuous in views being overshadowed by the more imposing and impressive peaks of the Cairngorms which stand nearby. The hill is located at the head of Glen Derry and faces its higher and better-known neighbour Beinn Mheadhoin across the Lairig an Laoigh (The Pass of the Calves). Beinn a' Chaorainn reaches a height of 1,083 metres (3,553 feet) and qualifies as both a Munro and a Marilyn. The hill's name translates from the Gaelic as “Mountain of the Rowan tree” although today the hill seems bare of any trees. The mountain should not be confused with another Munro also known as Beinn a' Chaorainn which is in Glen Spean above Loch Laggan.

== Geography ==
Beinn a' Chaorainn lies on the northern part of the Moine Bhealaidh (Yellow Moss) plateau, a large area of featureless land which hardly drops below 850 metres, to the east of upper Glen Derry. The southern part of the plateau is occupied by another Munro, Beinn Bhreac, which lies 4.5 kilometres south of Beinn a' Chaorainn across boggy ground. On its western flanks Beinn a' Chaorainn falls away steeply to the Lairig an Laoigh pass on slopes that are mostly grassy but are craggy in places. To the east stands Beinn a' Chaorainn Bheag (1017 metres), a subsidiary top, which is listed in Munro's Tables. They are linked by a col with a height of 945 metres; there are several small lochans at the lowest point of the broad ridge, the largest of which is called Lochan Beinn a' Chaorainn. Further to the east (five kilometres from the summit) stands the massive mountain of Beinn a' Bhùird to which Beinn a' Chaorainn is linked by the high ground across the Moine Bhealaidh. Drainage from the mountain either goes south to the Derry Burn to eventually reach the sea at Aberdeen via the River Dee or north via Glen Avon and the River Spey to reach the Moray Firth.

== Ascents ==
The ascent of Beinn a' Chaorainn along with the neighbouring Munro of Beinn Bhreac is a long round trip of over 28 kilometres, starting at the Linn of Dee car park (NO065901), eight kilometres west of Braemar. The route follows the estate road along Glen Lui for five kilometres to Derry Lodge: bicycles can be used on this stretch of the route and secured in the woodland around Derry Lodge for collection on the return journey. The route then goes north up Glen Derry for two kilometres before ascending the western flanks of Beinn Bhreac and then continuing northwards for almost five kilometres across the Moine Bhealaidh to reach the summit of Beinn a' Chaorainn. An approach from the Aviemore side of the Cairngorms is feasible, starting at the Cairn Gorm ski centre, but this involves crossing or bypassing Cairn Gorm, Loch Avon and Beinn Mheadhoin before reaching the mountain and is a long, hard walk. The view from the summit gives a fine panorama and takes in all the Cairngorm giants. In snow and cloud, the cornices on the plateau are a notorious hazard.
