= River Avon, Strathspey =

Coordinates: 57.41468°N 3.37537°W

River Avon
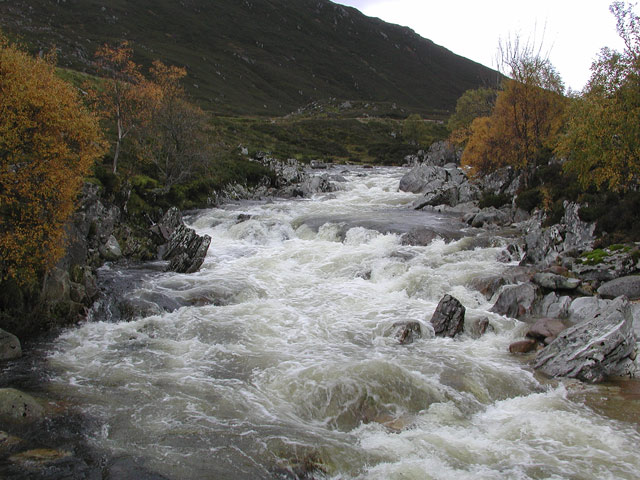
- The "Linn of Avon" in Glen Avon
- Native name: Abhainn Athfhinn (Scottish Gaelic)

Location
- Country: United Kingdom, Scotland
- Region: Moray

Physical characteristics
- Source
  - location: Loch A'an, Moray
- Mouth
  - location: Ballindalloch, Moray
- Length: 63.9 km (39.7 mi)

The River Avon (pronounced “A'an” /ɑːn/) is a river in the Strathspey area of the Scottish Highlands, and a tributary of the River Spey. It drains the north-eastern area of the Cairngorm Mountains and is largely contained within the Cairngorms National Park

The source of the River Avon is conventionally said to be Loch A'an situated between Cairn Gorm and Ben Macdui (Gaelic: Beinn MacDhuibh). Loch A'an itself collects headwaters from a number of burns on these two mountains. From there the river then continues east down Glen Avon to the north of Ben Avon, for 10 miles before turning north towards the village of Tomintoul and Strath Avon.

There is a River Avon Fishing Association that promotes tourism in nearby towns and fishing along the river.

== Tributaries ==
Over the first few miles flowing east through the Forest of Glenavon the Avon gathers to itself numerous small burns, the most notable of which are the Burn of Loin and the Builg Burn originating at Loch Builg. The latter flows down Glen Builg to enter the Avon on its right bank just downstream of the Linn of Avon.

A mile to the southwest of Tomintoul, the Water of Ailnack enters from the confines of a precipitous gorge - the higher reaches of this watercourse are known as the Water of Caiplich. Downstream of Tomintoul, the Conglass Water originating at the Lecht, enters from the east and the Burn of Lochy enters from Glen Lochy to the west. Above Bridge of Brown, the Lochy is fed in turn by the Burn of Brown. The lowermost tributary of the Avon is the River Livet which enters from Glenlivet on the right bank at Drumin just as the Avon leaves the national park.

Regarded from the point of view of river and mountain scenery, is perhaps the most perfect Glen in Scotland. For in the whole 38 miles, from its source above Loch Avon, to the Spey, there is not a single dour passage, and every phase of highland landscape is presented. From the wild barren grandeur of Ben Macdhui to the luxuriant beaches of Dalnashaugh, under whose shade the river flows deep and dark to meet the Spey. It is rash to discriminate among the beautys of such a glen, but perhaps not the least attractive are those in the middle reaches, where the hills are friendly rather than fearsome, where groves of silver birches break and soften the valley side, where the alder dips its branches in the singing water, and where the oyster-catcher sweeps and cries above the shingle. — Sir Henry Alexander (1875 - 1940)

== Etymology ==
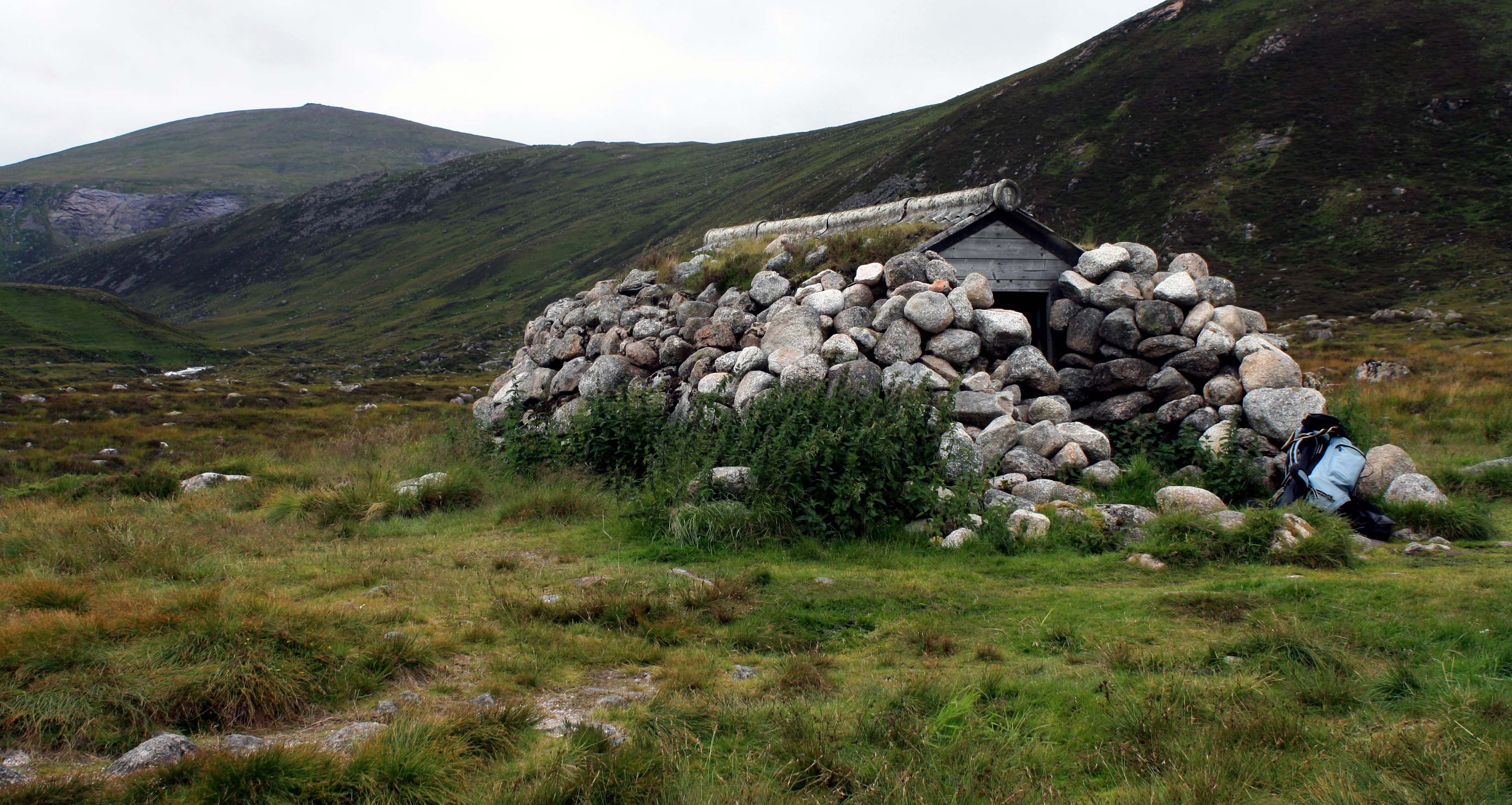
Fords of Avon refuge in Cairngorm National Park

Some authorities state that, in common with various other examples of Avon, the river takes its name from the Scottish Gaelic abhainn meaning 'river' or 'stream'. The word, in common with the Welsh afon, is thought to originate from an early Indo-European root ab or aub. Watson (1926) however, is of the view that the derivation is from the "early British Abone not Gaelic abhainn", the former being the precursor of both Pictish and Gaelic. Whatever the exact derivation, all agree that the name has the tautological meaning of 'river river'.
