= Loch Etchachan =

Lake in Aberdeenshire, Scotland

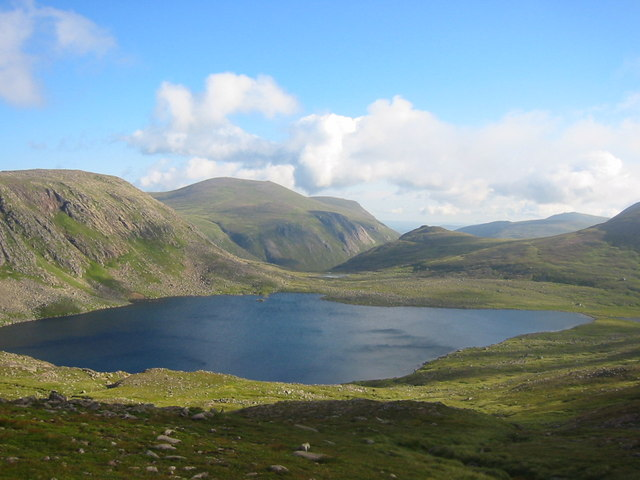
- Loch Etchachan, view north towards Cairn Gorm.

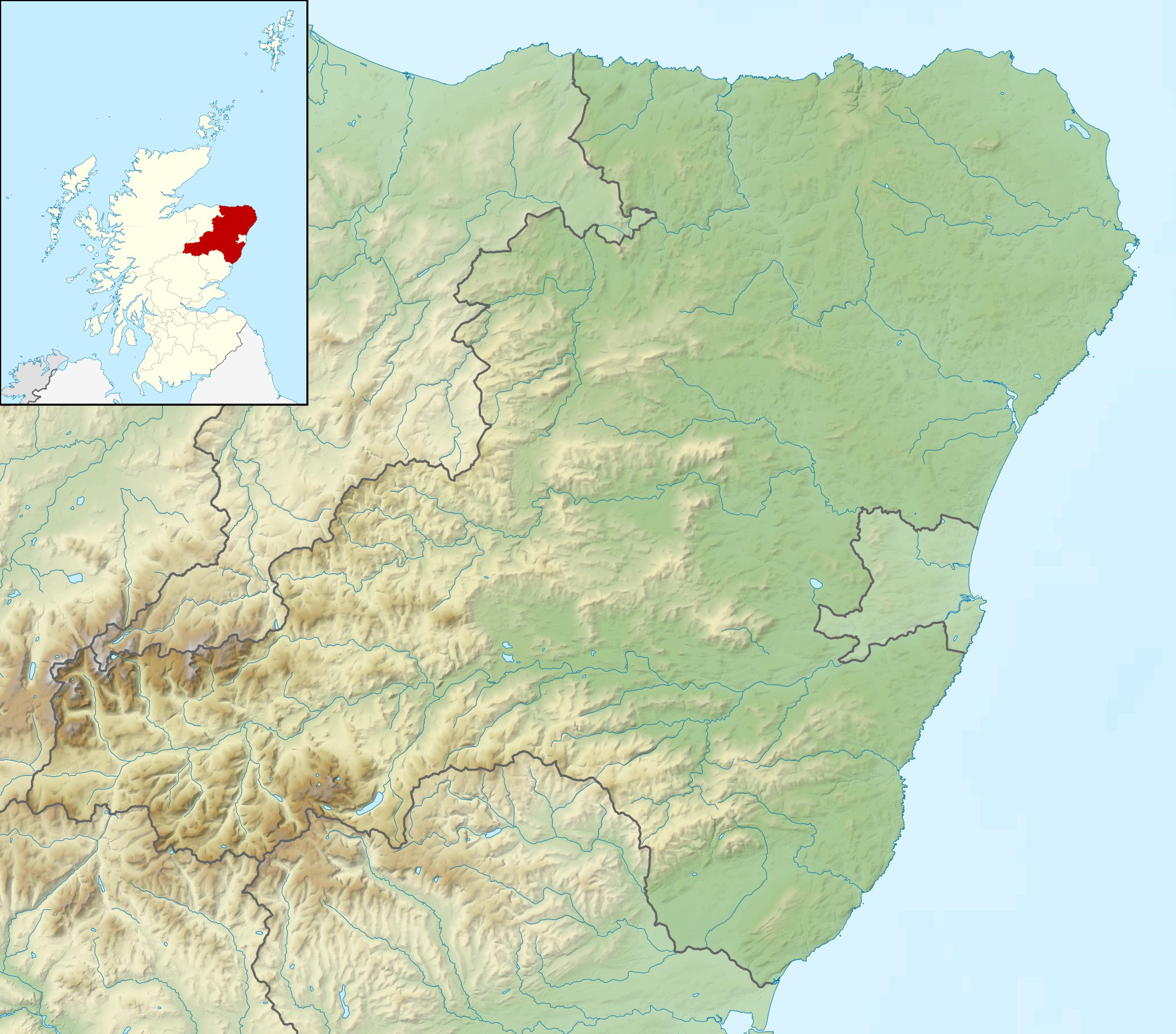
- Location within Aberdeenshire
- Location: Cairngorms, Grampian Mountains, Scotland
- Coordinates: 57°5′1.62″N 3°38′23.81″W
- Primary outflows: Derry Burn
- Basin countries: Scotland
- Max. length: 0.79 km (0.49 mi)
- Surface area: 0.23 km^{2} (0.089 sq mi)
- Average depth: 20 ft (6.1 m)
- Max. depth: 65 ft (20 m)
- Surface elevation: 3,041 ft (927 m)

Loch Etchachan is a remote freshwater loch set deep within the central Cairngorms plateau, in the Cairngorms National Park, located in the eastern Highlands of Scotland. It is the highest waterbody of its size in the UK, the surface being 927 metres (3,041 ft) above sea level. However, the highest named bodies of water in the UK are Loch Coire an Lochain, which lies 6km to the west of Loch Etchachan on the opposite side of the Lairig Ghru, and Lochan Buidhe, which lies between Cairn Lochan and Ben Macdui.

== Geography ==
Directly north of the loch and lying 664 ft (202 m) lower lies Loch A'an and the imposing peak of Cairn Gorm. To the northeast lies Beinn Mheadhoin, known for its broad and flat summit. To west, rising vertically lies the plateau of Carn Etchachan which constitute the lower slopes of Ben Macdui rising to a peak south of the loch, the second highest mountain in the UK. To the east, the loch flows into Little Loch Etchahan, which outflows through the gap made up of Creagan a' Choire Etchachan in the south and Stobb Coire Etchachan in the north, into what will become the Derry Burn turning southwards becoming the Lui Water before eventually flowing into the River Dee

== Trivia ==
On 12 August 2009, members of the Inverness Rowing Club carried a boat all the way up to the loch from the Linn of Dee, and rowed on the loch. This is believed to be the first time the loch has been rowed upon. Similarly, on Saturday 25 June 2011, members of Dundee Mountain Club carried a 3m long windsurf board plus, mast, and two sails to the loch to be the first to windsurf upon it. They also carried an ironing board and iron to do extreme ironing there at the same time. Both of these feats involved carrying the equipment on an 18.5 mile (30 km) round trip including 2,500 ft (750m) of ascent.

In 2024 a group of freedivers from NoTanx Apnea were the first to Freedive in the lake, they reported crystal clear water, a depth of over 20m but a muddy bottom.
