= Alpine speedwell =

Alpine speedwell is a common name for several plants and may refer to:

- Veronica alpina, native to Europe, Asia, and North America
- Veronica wormskjoldii, native to North America
