= Derry Cairngorm =

Mountain in Aberdeenshire, Scotland

Coordinates: 57.0622°N 3.6217°W

- Càrn Gorm an Doire
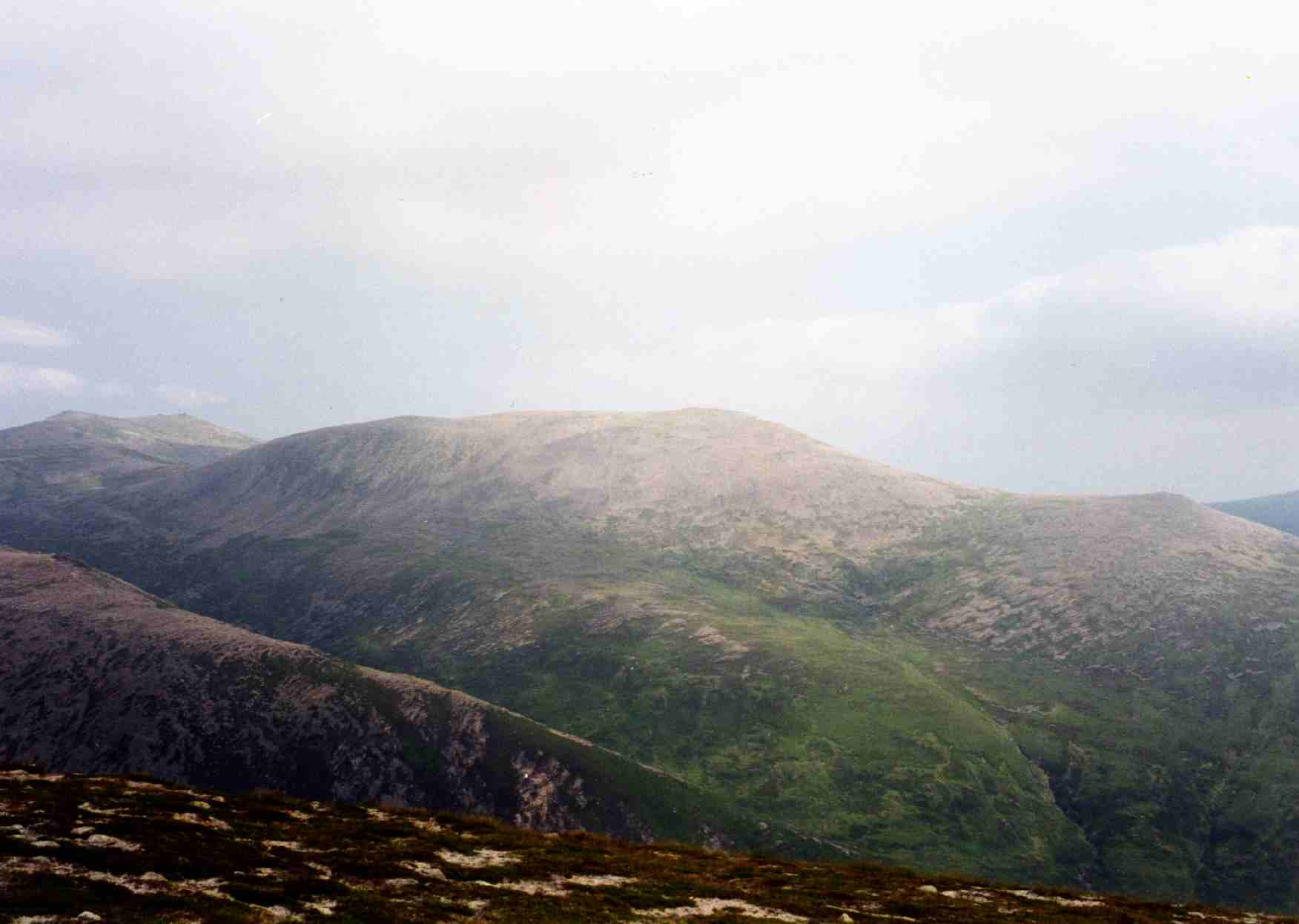
- Derry Cairngorm seen from Càrn a' Mhàim, 3.5 km to the SW. The Sròn Riach ridge descending from Ben Macdui is in the foreground

Highest point
- Elevation: 1,155 m (3,789 ft)
- Prominence: 141 m
- Parent peak: Ben Macdui
- Listing: Munro

Naming
- English translation: Blue Cairn of Derry
- Language of name: Gaelic
- Pronunciation: Scottish Gaelic: [ˈkʰaːrˠn ˈkɔɾɔm ən̪ˠ ˈt̪ɤɾʲə]

Geography
- Location: Cairngorms, Scotland
- Parent range: Grampians
- OS grid: NJ044013
- Topo map: OS Landranger 36, OS Explorers 403

Listed summits of Derry Cairngorm
Name	Grid ref	Height	Status
Creagan a' Choire Etchachan	NO012996	1108 m (3635 ft)	Munro Top
Sgurr an Lochan Uaine	NO025991	983 m (3225 ft)	Munro Top

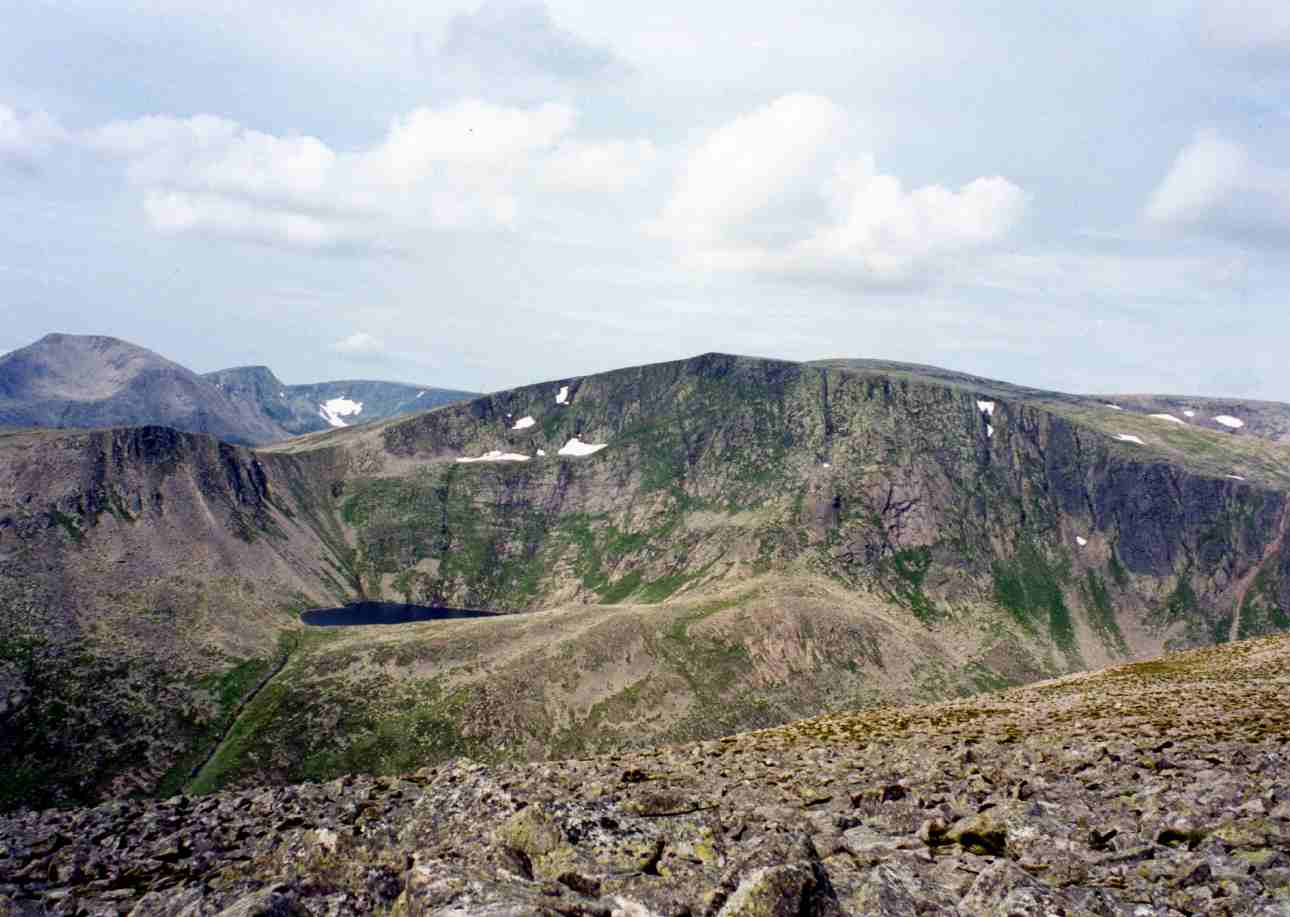
Looking west from the summit of Derry Cairngorm to Ben Macdui and Coire Sputan Dearg.

Derry Cairngorm (Scottish Gaelic: Càrn Gorm an Doire) is a Scottish mountain in the Cairngorms range, 14 kilometres (8.7 mi) north west of Braemar in the county of Aberdeenshire.

== Overview ==
Derry Cairngorm is regarded as part of the central group of Cairngorm hills, along with Ben Macdui and Càrn a' Mhàim. Ben Macdui stands four km to the north west and is connected by a col of height of 1014 m. The mountain was originally named An Carn Gorm but was renamed to Carn Gorm an Doire to avoid confusion with the nearby Cairn Gorm. The name has now been anglicised to Derry Cairngorm: the original Gaelic means “Blue cairn of Derry”. Derry is the anglicisation of doire, or doireach, meaning wooded, a reference to the Scots pines that adorn the southern slope of the mountain near Derry Lodge, remnants of the old Caledonian Forest. The hill is well seen from Inverey and often appears as dark blue in colour, however from other angles it takes on a distinct pink tinge as result of its granite rocks (see photo).

== Geography ==
Derry Cairngorm is a six/seven-kilometre-long ridge-type mountain that runs north to south, it rises from Glen Luibeg in the south and concludes at Coire Etchachan in the north, where it is joined to Beinn Mheadhoin. Coire Etchachan has Loch Etchachan lying within it, at a height of 930 metres the highest notable expanse of water in Great Britain. It has trout living in it. On its eastern flanks the mountain falls steeply and craggily into Glen Derry while its western flanks descend more moderately to the valley of the infant Luibeg Burn. Derry Cairngorm is characterised by large granite boulders on its higher slopes which make walking in the summit area difficult, the walker often having to resort to hopping between boulders. This large expanse of boulders is formed by the action of freezing and thawing in a periglacial environment and is known as a blockfield or felsenmeer. All drainage from the mountain flows south via the Derry and Luibeg burns to join the River Dee, eventually reaching the sea at Aberdeen.

Derry Cairngorm has two subsidiary summits listed in the Munro Tables. Creagan a' Choire Etchachan (1108 m) stands 1.5 km north of the main summit and is a fine viewpoint down into the wild Coire Etchachan. Sgurr an Lochan Uaine (983 m), 1.5 km north east, is seen as just a hump near the cliff edge from the main summit but is more distinct when seen from Glen Derry, which it overlooks.

== Ascents ==
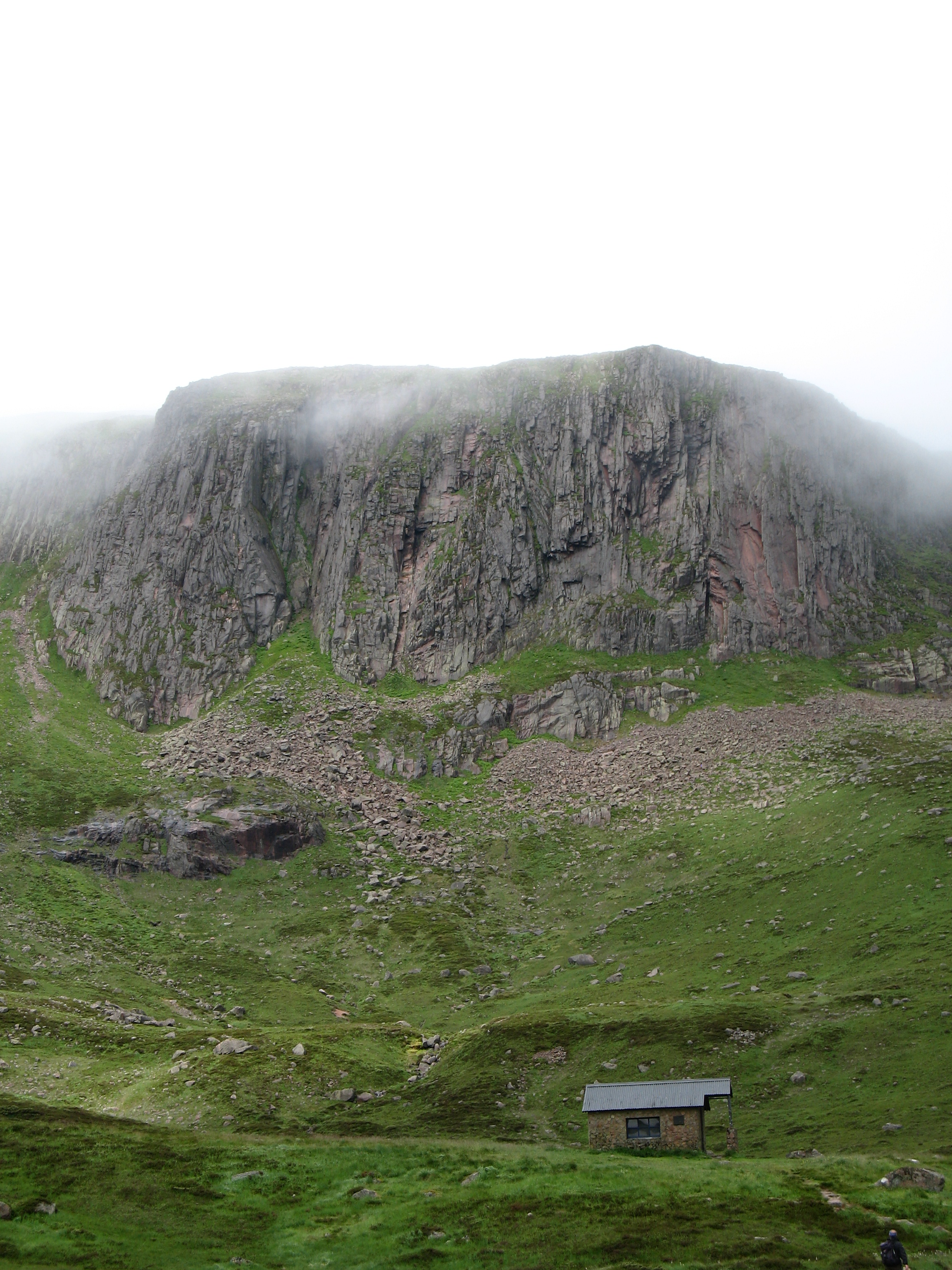
Hutchinson Memorial Hut and Creagan a'Choire Etchachan, as passed on the approach to Derry Cairngorm from Derry Lodge

Derry Cairngorm can be climbed from either the east or west sides of the Cairngorm range and either singly or in combination with other hills. The ascent from the east starts at the Linn of Dee car park (NO065901) and takes the track to Derry Lodge (a bicycle can be used as far as the lodge). The southern ridge of Derry Cairngorm is then ascended to reach the summit, crossing Little Cairngorm on the way. The mountain can be climbed from the Cairn Gorm ski centre car park (NH989061) and involves climbing and crossing Ben Macdui before continuing to Derry Cairngorm. The Ben Macdui summit plateau can be a hazardous place in mist and bad weather. The ascent from the Linn of Dee can also include climbing Càrn a' Mhàim and Ben Macdui. This is a long hard day's walking of over 30 kilometres, although the use of a bicycle to and from Derry Lodge will help quite a bit. The view from the summit is very good with all the Cairngorm giants looking fine.

== See also ==
- Ben Nevis
- List of Munro mountains
- Mountains and hills of Scotland
