= Ben Macdui =

Second highest mountain in the United Kingdom

Coordinates: 57.070651°N 3.66685°W

- Beinn MacDuibh
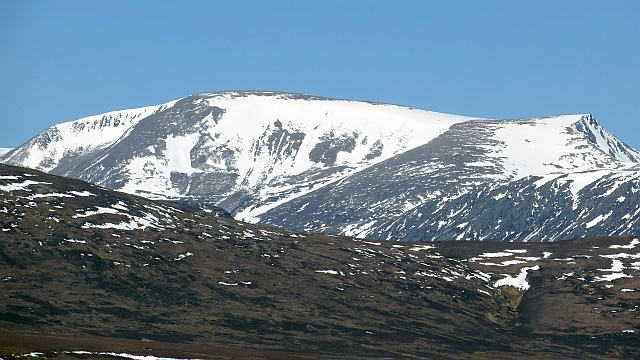
- Ben Macdui from the south

Highest point
- Elevation: 1,309 m (4,295 ft)
- Prominence: 950 m (3,120 ft); Ranked 9th in British Isles
- Isolation: 86.5 km (53.8 miles)
- Listing: Marilyn, Munro, Hardy, Council top (Aberdeenshire, Moray), County top (Aberdeenshire, Banffshire)

Naming
- English translation: MacDuff's mountain
- Pronunciation: Scottish Gaelic: [ˈpeiɲ maxk ˈt̪ɯj]

Geography
- Ben Macdui in Aberdeenshire Ben Macdui in Scotland
- Location: Moray / Aberdeenshire, Scotland
- Parent range: Cairngorms
- OS grid: NN989989
- Topo map: OS Landranger 36, 43, Explorer OL57

Ben Macdui (Scottish Gaelic: Beinn MacDuibh, meaning "MacDuff's mountain") is the second-highest mountain in Scotland and all of the British Isles, after Ben Nevis, and the highest of the Cairngorm Mountains. The summit is 1,309 metres (4,295 ft) above sea level and it is classed as a Munro. Ben Macdui is situated on the southwestern edge of the Cairngorm plateau, overlooking the Lairig Ghru pass to the west, and Loch Etchachan to the east. It lies on the boundary between the historic counties of Aberdeenshire and Banffshire.

Before the production of accurate maps of Scotland in the 19th century, it was not known for certain that Ben Nevis was the highest point in Britain, and it was often thought that Ben Macdui might be higher. Following surveys of both peaks in 1846–47, Ben Nevis was confirmed as the higher. The summit of the mountain has a direction indicator erected in 1925 by the Cairngorm Club of Aberdeen in memory of former president Alexander Copland. The indicator shows the directions of the most noteworthy mountains that can be seen from the summit in clear weather.

Snow patches have been known to persist at various locations on Ben Macdui, most notably Garbh Uisge Beag. The mountain is said to be haunted by the legendary Am Fear Liath Mòr (Big Grey Man).

== History ==
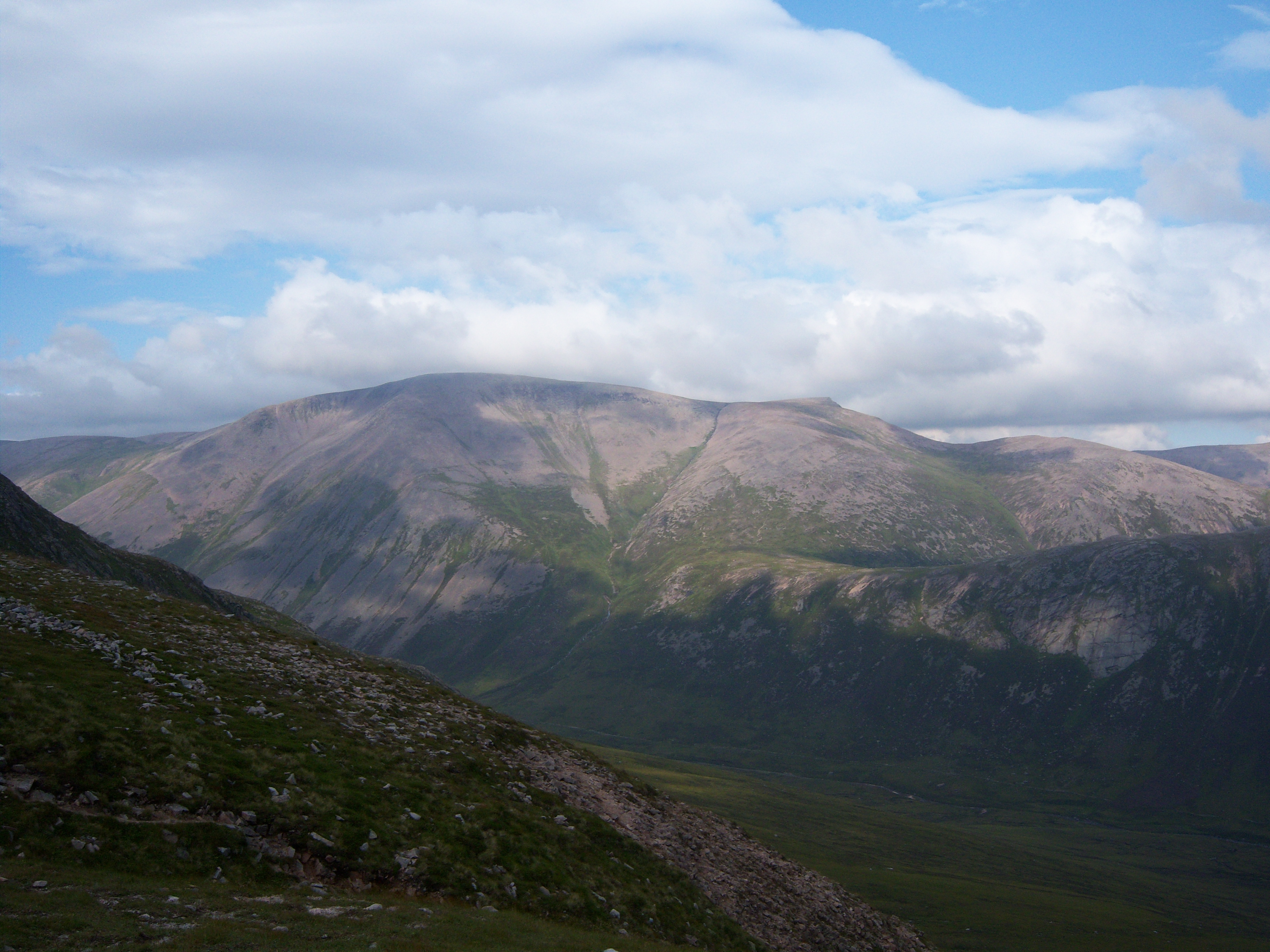
Ben Macdui from Cairn Toul to the west

After the defeat of Domnall mac Uilliam in 1187, Donnchad II, Earl of Fife, acquired Stratha'an, a territory stretching from Ballindalloch to Ben Macdui. Because the mountain marked the western boundary of Donnchad's territory, Gaelic scholar historian F.C. Diack and place-name scholar Professor G.W.S. Barrow have suggested that the mountain took its name from Donnchad's family, the Mac Duibh. Another suggestion is that the name comes from the Gaelic for "black pig", muc dhubh, referring to its shape. A 19th-Century Ordnance Survey name book suggests the name signifies "The Black Son mountain".

In 1810 a Rev Dr Keith surveyed the heights of several Cairngorm summits using a barometer, estimating the height of Ben Macdui to be 4,300 ft (1,300 m). This sparked interest in whether it, or Ben Nevis, was the highest summit in Scotland. The Ordnance Survey built a trig point on the summit in 1847 in order to accurately survey the height, confirming that Ben Nevis was indeed the higher. The surveyors also built a small shelter that became known as the "Sappers' Bothy", the remains of which can still be seen. Following these surveys, there were plans to build a cairn on top of Ben Macdui to make its height greater than Ben Nevis, but these plans did not come to fruition.

Queen Victoria hiked to the summit on 7 October 1859, aged forty. About her experience, she wrote: "It had a sublime and solemn effect, so wild, so solitary – no one but ourselves and our little party there ... I had a little whisky and water, as the people declared pure water would be too chilling."

During the Second World War commando troops training in the Cairngorms visited the summit of Ben Macdui, building small shelters to the northeast of the summit. In early 1940 a plane crashed at the top of the Allt a' Choire Mhòir, to the northwest of the summit. On 26 March 2001, two USAF F-15 Eagle aircraft from the 493rd Fighter Squadron at RAF Lakenheath crashed near the summit during a low-flying exercise killing pilots Captain Kirk Jones and Lieutenant-Colonel Kenneth John Hyvonen.

== Climbing ==
Probably the easiest route of ascent is from the Coire Cas car park at the foot of Cairngorm Ski Centre by a path that leads up over slowly rising moorland. This route is about seven kilometres (four miles) long; a somewhat longer route allows one also to climb Cairn Gorm. One possible alternative route follows the path coming up from Loch Etchachan. This loch may be reached from Loch Avon to the north or by coming up from Glen Derry to the south. Other routes include coming over Derry Cairngorm, or via the Lairig Ghru pass, which lies to the west of Ben Macdui.

When coming from the south it is possible to use a bicycle to cover the five kilometres (three miles) from the road end at Linn of Dee to Derry Lodge at the southern end of the massif.

== Am Fear Liath Mòr ==
The area of Ben Macdui is said to be haunted by the legendary cryptid Am Fear Liath Mòr ('the Big Grey Man') or 'Greyman'. There have been several accounts of an unnatural presence, with mountaineer Norman Collie claiming to have heard footsteps before fleeing from the summit in terror.

== Gallery ==
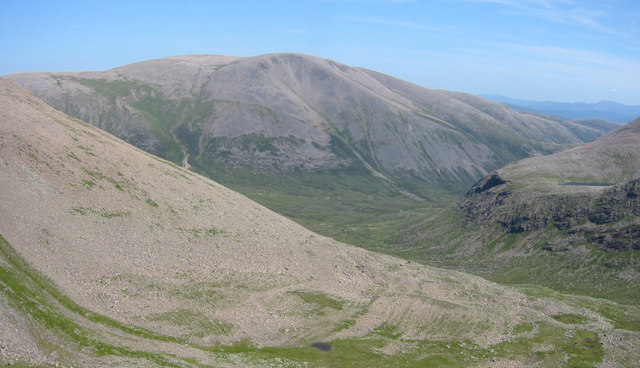
View from the northwest on Braeriach

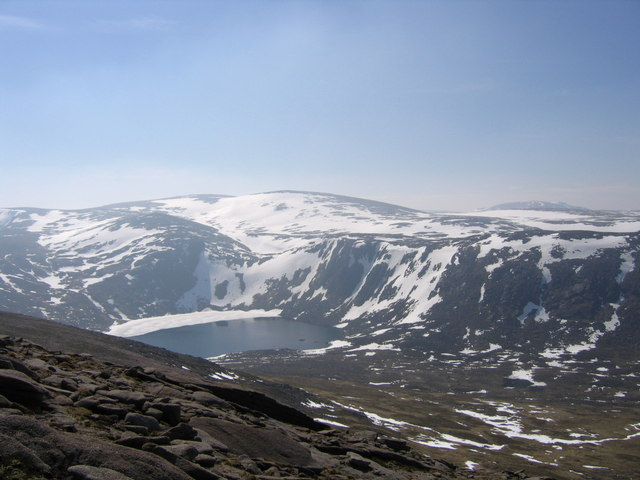
View from the east on Beinn Mheadhoin, inside the Cairngorm plateau

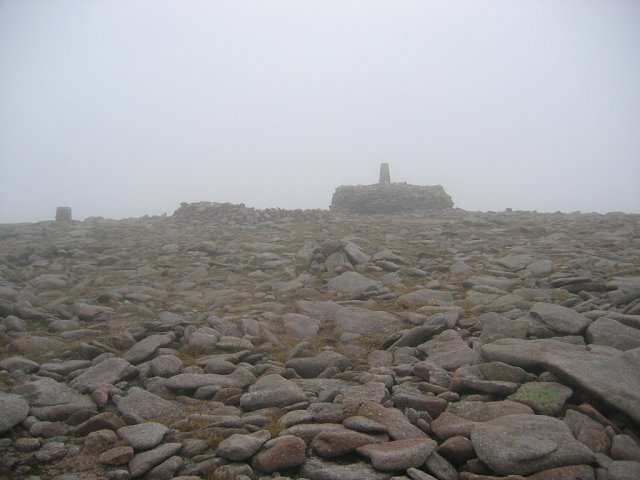
Summit of Ben Macdui

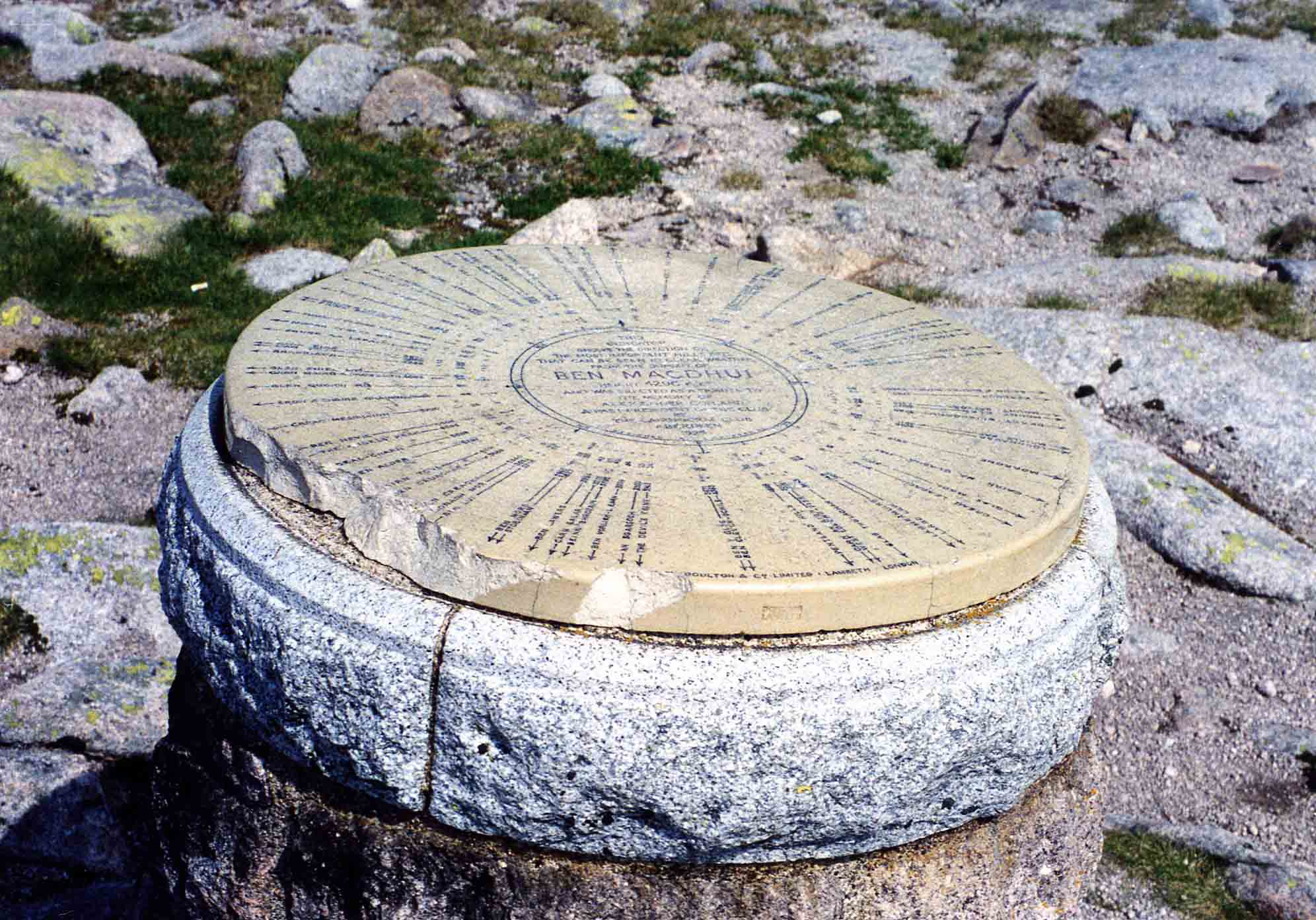
Summit indicator erected by the Cairngorm Club in 1925
