= Lochan Buidhe =

Small lake in Moray, Scotland

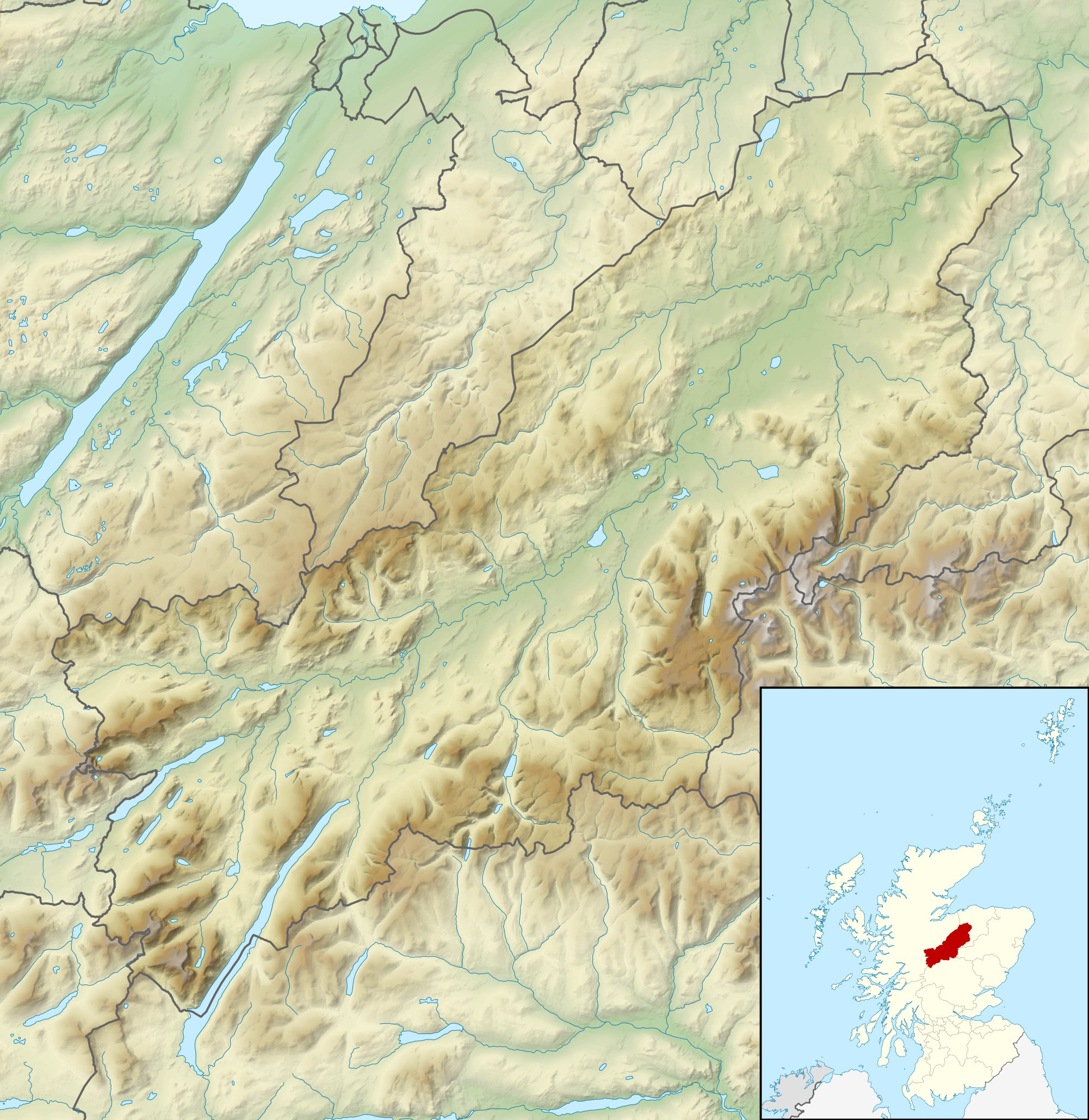
- Location within Badenoch and Strathspey
- Location: Cairngorms, Grampian Mountains, Scotland
- Coordinates: 57°5′21.2″N 3°40′44.9″W
- Primary outflows: Feith Buidhe
- Basin countries: Scotland
- Max. length: 100 m (330 ft)
- Max. width: 50 m (160 ft)
- Surface area: 4,451 m^{2} (47,910 sq ft)
- Surface elevation: 1,120 m (3,670 ft)

Lochan Buidhe is a small freshwater loch located on the Cairngorm Plateau in the eastern Highlands of Scotland. At over 1,120 m (3,670 ft) above sea level, it is the highest named body of water in the British Isles.

The loch and its primary outflow, Feith Buidhe were the site of the 1971 Cairngorm Plateau disaster, in which a group of five school students and their leader died of exposure after being stranded in the open for two nights in a blizzard.

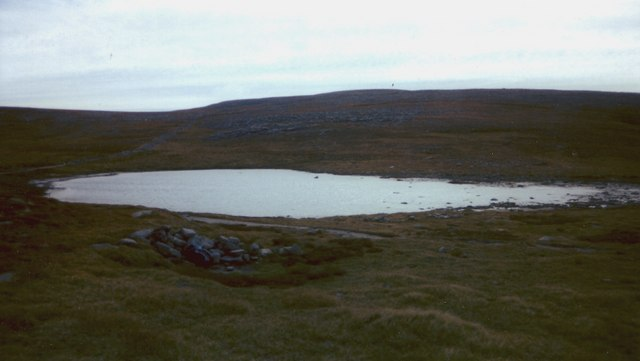
Lochan Buidhe
