= Loch A'an =

Lake in Moray, Scotland

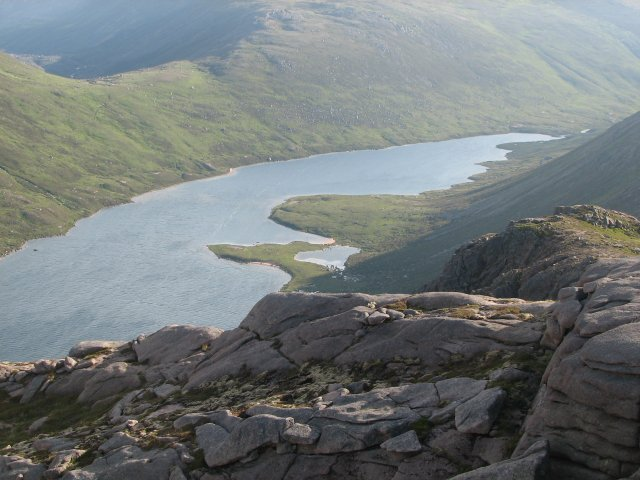
- A view towards the east end of the loch from Stacan Dubha.

- Location within Highland
- Location: Cairngorms, Grampian Mountains, Scotland
- Coordinates: 57°6′12.36″N 3°37′37.68″W
- Type: Natural freshwater lake
- Primary outflows: River Avon
- Basin countries: Scotland
- Max. length: 4.8 km (3.0 mi)
- Max. width: 0.29 km (0.18 mi)
- Surface area: 0.43 km^{2} (0.17 sq mi)
- Average depth: 77.27 ft (23.55 m)
- Max. depth: 101 ft (31 m)
- Shore length^{1}: 0.3 km (0.19 mi)
- Surface elevation: 725 m (2,379 ft)
- ^{1} Shore length is not a well-defined measure.

Loch A'an is a remote freshwater loch set deep within the central Cairngorms plateau, in the Cairngorms National Park, located in the eastern Highlands of Scotland. Loch A'an, also called Loch Avon, is the source of the River Avon. Loch A'an is oriented southwest–northeast and is bounded on three sides by precipitous mountains, cliffs and crags, with the North-East opening out to provide an outflow for the river through Glen Avon.

== Geography ==
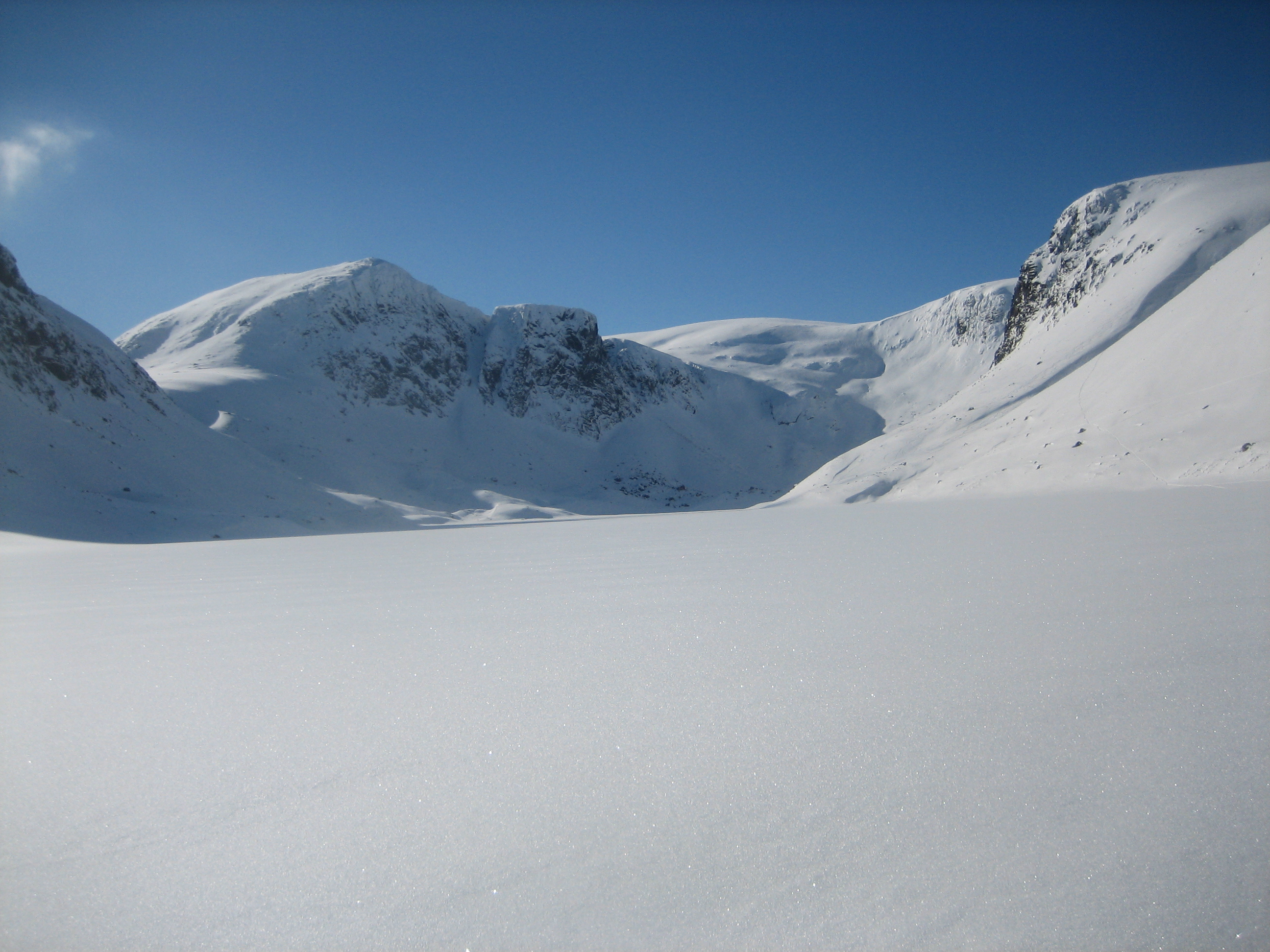
Loch Avon in winter

To the north of the loch, rising almost vertically, lies the Cairn Gorm, the sixth highest mountain in the United Kingdom. Southwest of Cairn Gorm, at the head of the loch, lies the imposing peak of Ben Macdui, the second-highest mountain in the UK, and to east lies Beinn Mheadhoin, the thirteenth-highest mountain in the UK, again rising almost vertically from the Loch A'an basin. Lying 1.2 kilometres (3/4 mile) south of the loch and 202 m (663 ft) higher up the range at an elevation of 927 m (3,041 ft), lies Loch Etchachan.

== Poem ==
Nan Shepherd wrote a short poem about the loch in her 1934 anthology In the Cairngorms.

Loch A’an, Loch A’an, hoo deep ye lie!
Tell nane yer depth and nane shall I.
Bricht though yer deepmaist pit may be,
Ye’ll haunt me till the day I dee.
Bricht, an’ bricht, an’ bricht as air,
Ye’ll haunt me noo for evermair.

== Gallery ==
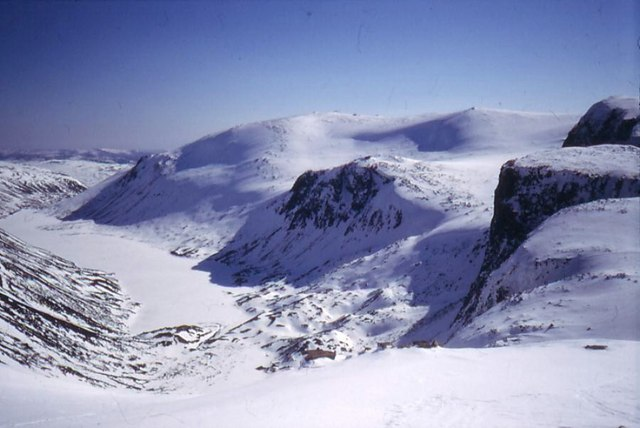
The Loch in springtime before the thaw

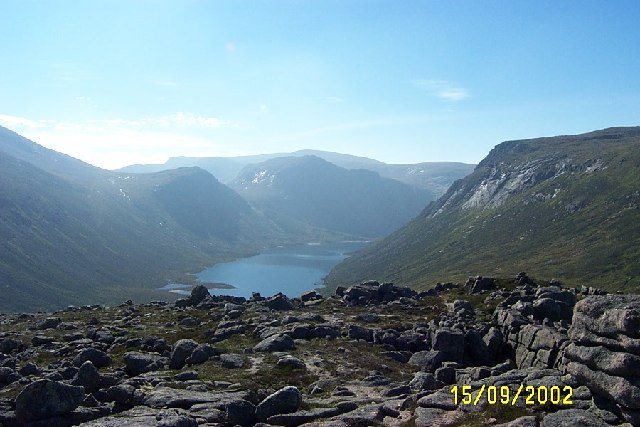
Photo taken from just east of the Saddle on the SW ridge of A'Choinneach

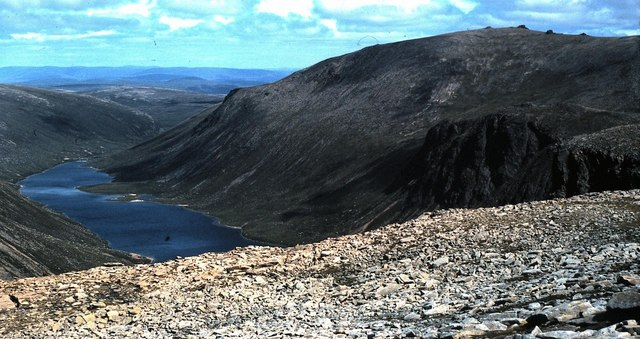
View towards Loch A'an and Beinn Mheadhoin The 'Middle Hill' from Shelter Stone Craig.

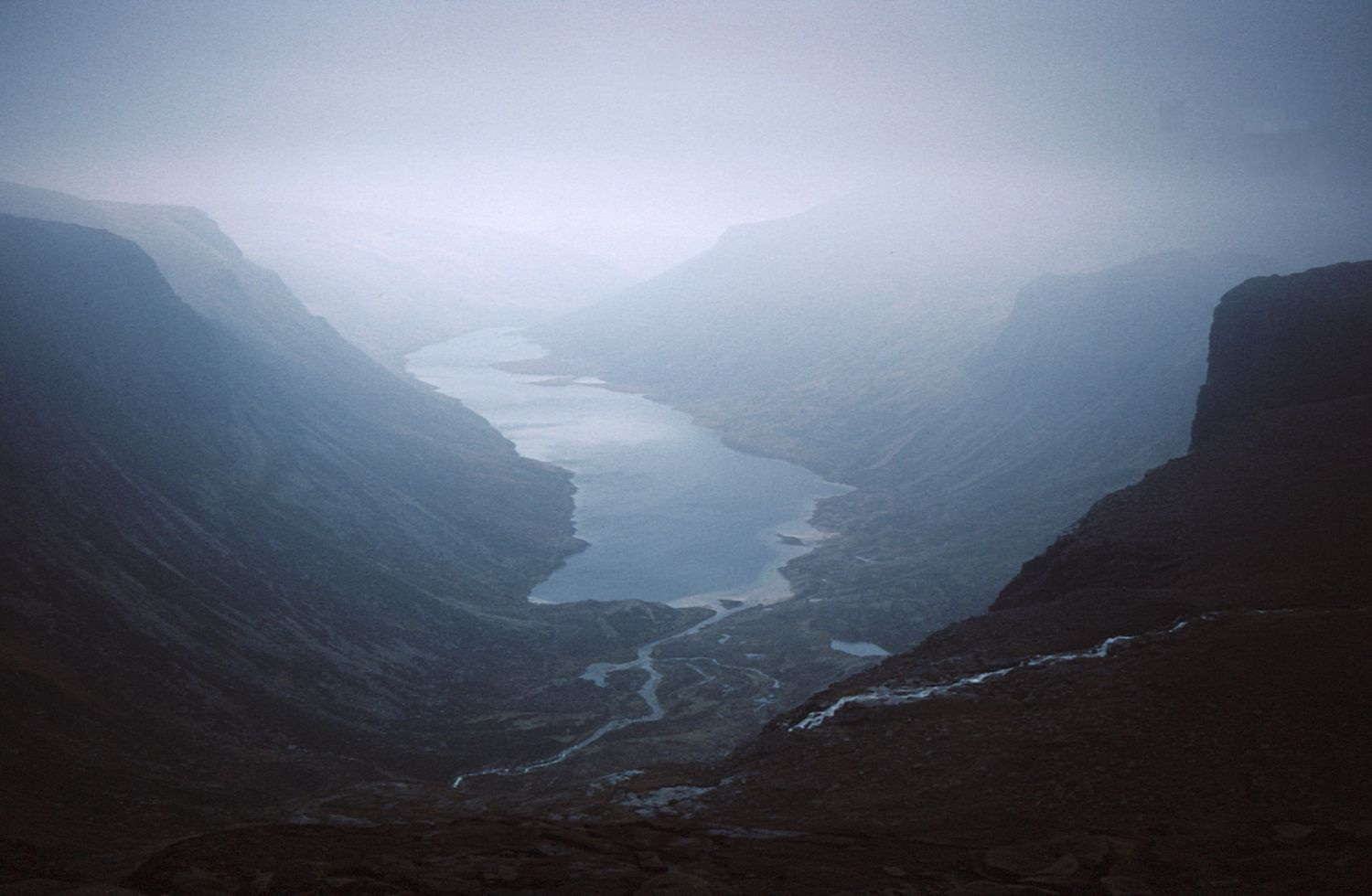
Burns tumble towards Loch Avon
