= Beinn Mheadhoin (Cairngorms) =

Mountain in Scotland

Coordinates: 57.09589°N 3.61246°W

- Beinn Meadhain
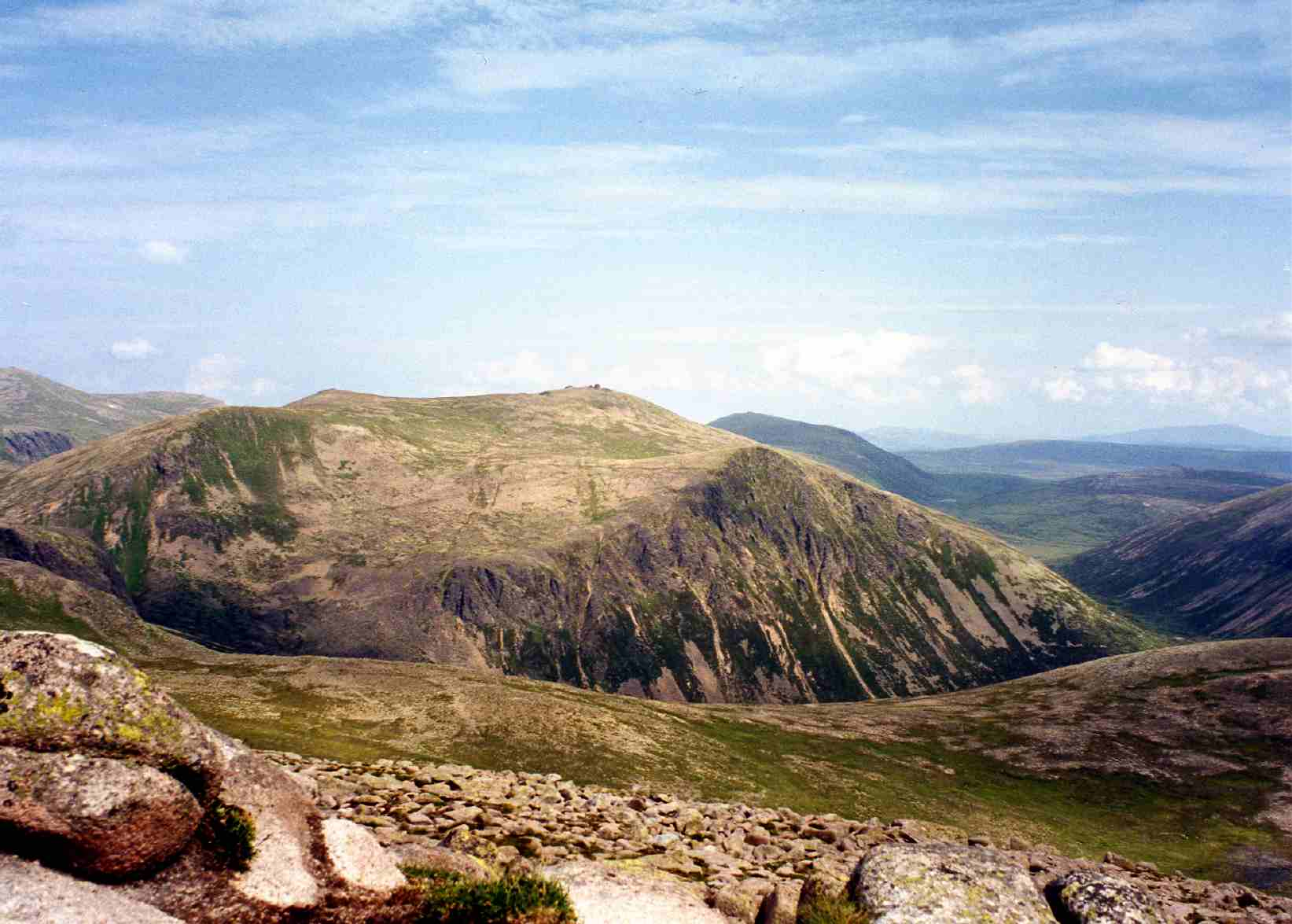
- Beinn Mheadhoin from the summit of Derry Cairngorm

Highest point
- Elevation: 1,182 m (3,878 ft)
- Prominence: c. 254 m
- Listing: Marilyn, Munro

Naming
- English translation: middle mountain
- Language of name: Gaelic
- Pronunciation: Scottish Gaelic: [peɲ ˈviə.ɛɲ]

Geography
- Location within Scotland
- Location: Moray, Scotland
- Parent range: Cairngorms
- OS grid: NJ024017
- Topo map: OS Landranger 36

Beinn Mheadhoin or Beinn Meadhain (Scottish Gaelic for 'middle mountain') is a mountain in the Highlands of Scotland. It is a Munro with a height of 1,182 metres (3,878 ft) and by some counts it is the twelfth-highest mountain of Great Britain. It lies in the very heart of the Cairngorm mountains, and is one of the most remote in the region. Beinn Mheadoin is surrounded by deep glens and mountain lakes, including Loch A'an, Loch Etchachan and the Dubh Lochan.

The summit is broad and flat. It is noted for its summit tors - large boulders left by retreating ice sheets at the end of the last ice age. The highest point is, in fact, the top of one of the largest tors, and a scramble is required to reach it.

== Climbing ==
The mountain is remote; the shortest route is to climb over the main Cairn Gorm plateau in order to ascend Beinn Mheadhoin. The shortest route of ascent is from the Coire Cas car park at the foot of the Cairn Gorm ski area, initially heading for the ridge of Fiacaill a' Choire Chais. From the head of the ridge, the walker then descends to Loch Avon via Coire Raibert. The route then goes round the head of the loch, passing the famous Shelter Stone, before rising again to reach Loch Etchachan. From here the route heads northeast onto the summit ridge. This route is about 20 kilometres (12 mi) in length, with 1,400 metres (4,600 ft) of ascent required.

Beinn Mheadhoin may also be climbed from the south, via Glen Derry. This route is much longer, though a bicycle can be used on the track to shorten the time taken. An ascent from this direction could conceivably be combined with an ascent of Derry Cairngorm.

== See also ==
- List of Munro mountains
- Mountains and hills of Scotland
