= Qitmir =

Dog that guarded the People of the Cave in Islamic tradition

In Islamic tradition, Qitmir (Arabic: قطمير) was the dog that guarded the Companions of the Cave and stood by them all through their long sleep. His name, Qitmir, is, in Arabic, also the small membrane separating a date from its pit. He is sometimes called Ar-Raqim (Arabic: الرقيم), although narrations identify Ar-Raqim as the name of the cave, or a "brass plate, or stone table".

He is regarded as one of the most important animals of Islam. In Tafsir Ibn Kathir, Ibn Jurayj described Qitmir as lying outside the door on his stomach with his front legs stretched out. He was also said to be either the hunting dog of one of the Companions of the Cave, which is the more accepted view, or the dog of the king’s chef, who accepted the Aṣḥāb al-Kahf's religious views, and brought Qitmir with him.

== In the Quran ==
In Al-Kahf, the following is mentioned:

And you would have thought they were awake, while they were actually asleep. And We turned them on their right and on their left sides, and their dog stretching forth his two forelegs at the entrance [of the Cave]. Had you looked at them, you would certainly have run away from them, and would certainly have been filled with awe of them.

—

== Alleged skull ==
Jordanian archaeologist Rafiq Al-Dajani entered the Cave of the Seven Sleepers in Al-Rajib in 1963, where he allegedly found seven graves, and part of a dog's skull on the door of the cave.
