= Eshab-ı Kehf Cave =

Cave in Tarsus, Turkey

- Eshab-ı Kehf Mağarası
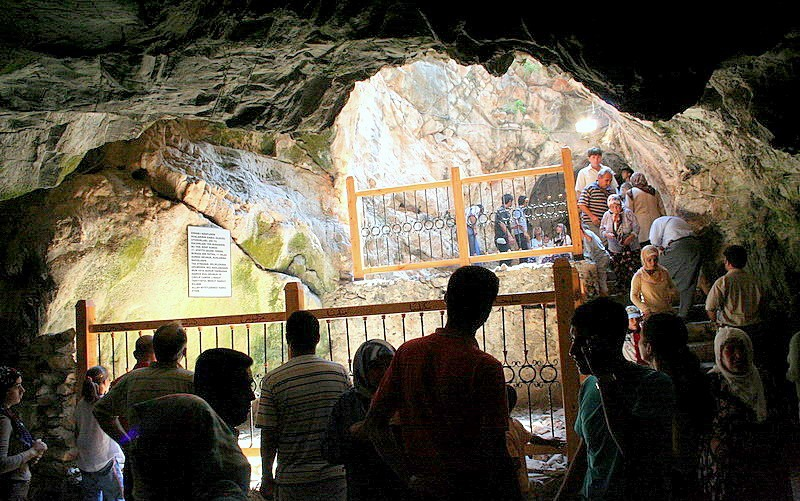
- In the cave.

- Location within Turkey
- Location: Turkey
- Coordinates: 36°57′26″N 34°47′48″E

Eshab-ı Kehf Cave, also known as Ashab-ı Kehf Cave or Seven Sleepers' Cave, (Turkish: Eshab-ı Kehf Mağarası, Ashab-ı Kehf Mağarası or Yedi Uyurlar Mağarası) is a show cave situated to the north of Tarsus, an ilçe (district) in Mersin Province, Turkey. The cave is named after the Persian word اصحاب کهف ("Ashāb-i Kahf") itself from the Arabic "aṣḥāb al-kahf", "people of the cave", for the Seven Sleepers of Ephesus, a belief in Christian and Islamic tradition.

The cave is about 14 kilometres (8.7 mi) to Tarsus and about 40 kilometres (25 mi) to Mersin, at the foot of a small hill. The cave is small, not comparable to other caves of the province. However, it is famed to be the cave of the Seven Sleepers. The Seven sleepers are significant in Islam as they are exclusively mentioned in a chapter of the Holy Koran, Surah Al-Kahf. The exact location of the Seven Sleepers' cave is not known, and there are many other contenders to the title, including some in Turkey. Next to the cave, there is a mosque commissioned by the Ottoman Sultan Abdülaziz (reigned 1861–1876) and built in 1873. The mosque's tall minaret with three şerefes (balconies) were added later.

The other probable locations of the Seven Sleepers in Turkey are:

- Ephesus in İzmir Province
- Lice in Diyarbakır Province
- Afşin in Kahramanmaraş Province (see Eshab-ı Kehf Kulliye)
