= Calligraphic Galleon =

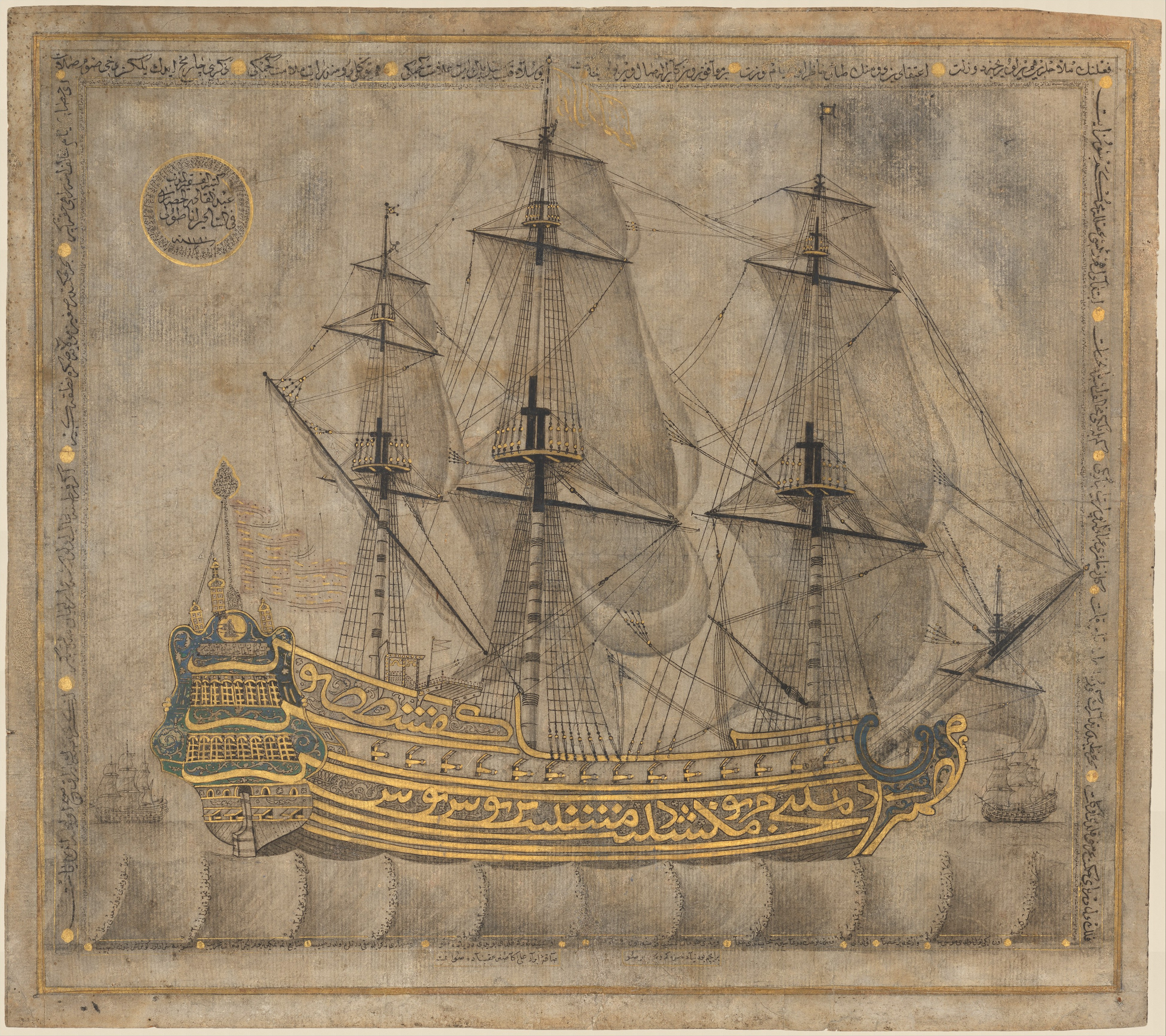
- Artist: Abd al-Qadir Hisari
- Year: c. 1766–67
- Medium: Ink and gold on paper
- Dimensions: 48.3 cm × 43.2 cm (19.0 in × 17.0 in)
- Location: Metropolitan Museum of Art; New York City

The Calligraphic Galleon is an example of Islamic calligraphy dating to the mid-18th century. Attributed to a calligrapher in the Ottoman Empire, the work depicts a galleon of the Ottoman navy. The ship is inscribed with the names of the Seven Sleepers, a group of men who were protected by the Abrahamic God, likely to confer a blessing of protection on the ship. It is in the collection of the Metropolitan Museum of Art.

== Description ==
=== Background ===
Calligraphy has had a long and storied history in the Islamic World. While the art form was most commonly reserved for writing or inscribing, some individual works of art were entirely made using calligraphy. Known as "calligrams", these images depicted a number of subjects. One such subject was ships, with calligrams of ships being especially popular in the Ottoman Empire. Some practitioners of Sufism attached a degree of mystical importance to these works of art, which were displayed inside of ritual spaces. A similar art-form—Pictorial Writing—was also prevalent in Persia.

=== Calligraphic Galleon ===
The Met's galleon is done in ink-and-gold on paper. The prominently displayed ship depicted by the calligram is a galleon, a large warship famously used by the Spanish and Portuguese empires during the Age of sail. Due to the Ottoman navy frequently encountering the large Spanish ships in the Mediterranean, the empire's navy built a number of their own galleons to counter the Spanish threat. Thus, the Met's calligram was likely created in honor of the commissioning of new galleons into the Ottoman navy. An example of a similar calligram, depicting a 17th-century oared ship, is in the collection of the Topkapı Palace Museum in Istanbul, Turkey.

The calligram's creator inscribed characters representing the story of the Seven Sleepers (the Ashab al-Kahf in Arabic), a group of seven men who were given refuge in a cave by God, onto the galleon; it has been posited that such an inscription on the work was intended to protect the ship from harm, just as God protected the seven sleepers. In addition, the Ottoman navy was dedicated to the Seven Sleepers, all of whose names can be seen on the galleon's hull and deck.
