= Arabissus =

Town in ancient Cataonia - Cappadocia

Coordinates: 38°14′46″N 36°54′42″E

Arabissus or Arabissos (Ancient Greek: Ἀραβισσός), also known as Tripotamos, was a town in ancient Cataonia, then Cappadocia, and later in the Roman province of Armenia Secunda.

== History ==
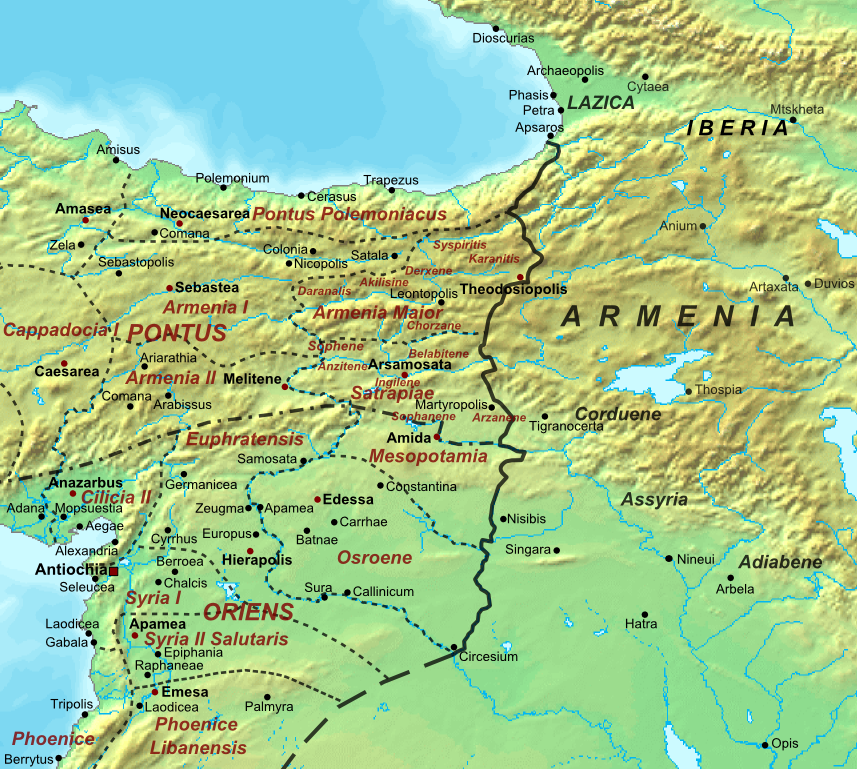
Arabissus in the 5th century

The Byzantine Emperor Maurice was born there in 539 who embellished it during his reign. The town suffered from the earthquake of 584/85 and in July 629, emperor Heraclius met here with Shahrbaraz to arrange terms with Persia to end the ongoing war.

The town belonged to the so-called Armenian Hexapolis and remained under Byzantine control in the seventh century. It suffered much during the wars with the Arabs and became the center of a kleisoura. After Sayf al-Dawla ravaged Arabissos and its environment in his campaigns of 944 and 951, the town was replaced by Plasta.

== Location ==
The town corresponds to present-day Afşin, formerly Yarpuz, in Kahramanmaraş Province, Turkey. Arabissus has in some publications been identified with Gülşehir; however, this connection has been refuted. Gülşehir’s earlier names Arapsun and Yarapson probably derive from the ancient Tripotamos rather than from Arabissos.

A cave of the Seven Sleepers is located in the Eshab-ı Kehf Kulliye.

== Ecclesiastical history ==
Arabissus was an episcopal see, a suffragan of Melitene.

Eudoxius of Antioch, the bishop of Antioch, was from Arabissus.

Its diocesan bishops included Otreius, who was at the First Council of Constantinople in 381, and Adolius at the Council of Chalcedon in 451, Adelphius, who was a signatory of the 458 letter of the bishops of the province of Armenia II to Byzantine Emperor Leo I the Thracian to protest at the murder of Proterius of Alexandria, the writer Leontius, who came later, and Georgius, who was at the Trullan Council of 692. Michael the Syrian mentions several Jacobite Church bishops of Arabissus of the 7th to the 10th centuries. Its titular bishops include Stephen Peter Alencastre (1924–1940).

Arabissus is now a titular see of the Catholic Church.

== Sources ==
- Foss, Clive (1991). "Arabissos". The Oxford Dictionary of BYZANTIUM. Dumbarton Oaks. p. 149.
- Cooper, Eric; Decker, Michael J. (24 July 2012). Life and Society in Byzantine Cappadocia. Springer. pp. 17, 25–28, 43. ISBN 978-1-137-02964-5.

Attribution

- The entry cites:
  - Le Quien, Oriens Christianus (1740), I, 449-450
