= Cave of the Seven Sleepers =

Religious site in Ephesus, Turkey. alternate al-Rajib, Jordan

Coordinates: 31°53′55.4″N 35°58′25.7″E

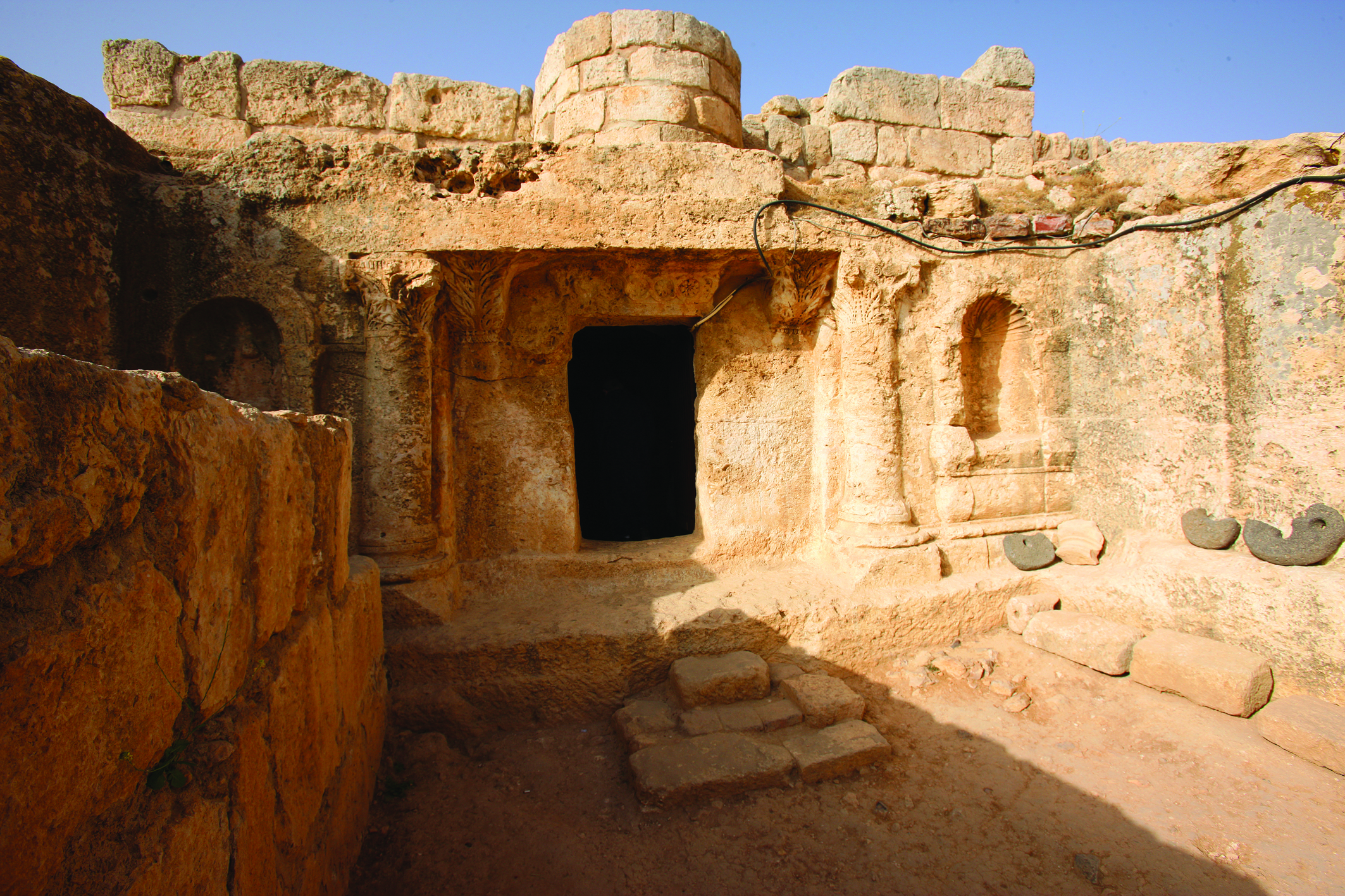
Entrance to Al-Raqeem Cave

The Cave of the Seven Sleepers (Arabic: كهف الرقيم, Kahf ar-Raqīm) is an archaeological and religious site in ar-Rajib, a village to the east of Amman, Jordan. It is claimed that this cave housed the Seven Sleepers, also known from Christian sources as the "Sleepers of Ephesus" and from the Qur’an as the "Companions of the Cave" (Arabic: اصحاب الكهف, romanized: aṣḥāb al kahf)—a group of young men who, according to Byzantine Christian and Islamic sources, fled the religious persecution of Roman emperor Decius. Legend has it that these men hid in a cave around AD 250, emerging miraculously centuries later - according to the Quran, 309 lunar years later. Rediscovered in 1951, it is one of several caves associated with the Seven Sleepers (see "Other contenders").

== Names and their etymology ==
=== Cave of the Seven Sleepers ===
The English name of this site refers to the seven sleepers who sought refuge in the cave, despite that accounts differ widely concerning the number of sleepers. The canonical Islamic text does not specify the exact number of sleepers.

=== Kahf ar-Raqīm ===
The site's Arabic name كهف الرقيم, Kahf ar-Raqīm, is based on the triliteral root ر-ق-م, denoting writing or calligraphy. It may refer to the village or mountain that the cave is located in. It also may refer to the book that recorded the names of the seven sleepers, as is suggested in Muhammad ibn Jarir al-Tabari's exegetical work Tafsir al-Tabari. The nearby village's modern name, al-Rajib, could be a corruption of the term al-raqīm.

== Description ==
The site consists at its core of a rock-hewn ancient burial cave with multiple burials. Some 500 metres west of the cave is a Byzantine cemetery.

The cave is partly natural, partly man-made. The entrance to the cave is flanked by two stone pilasters and two niches, one on each side, vestiges of a Byzantine church. The entrance is from the south, and above it are the remains of a mihrab (niche), once part of a mosque. Next to it are traces of a minaret, as well as four Byzantine pillars. An Arabic inscription states that this mosque, the second at the site, was built by orders of the son of Ahmad ibn Tulun, the founder of the Tulunid dynasty (r. 868–884). Archaeologists have concluded that here a Byzantine church was converted into a mosque in the time of Umayyad caliph Abd al-Malik ibn Marwan (d. 705), which underwent renovation under the Tulunids.

The cave contains seven sarcophagi. A hole has been carved through one of them, allowing a look at the bones buried inside. A wall inscription contains the basmala as well as verses from the Qur'an carved in Kufic script. Christian and Islamic symbols are also visible on the walls.

== Discovery and excavation ==
In 1951, Jordanian journalist Taysir Thabyan discovered the Cave of Seven Sleepers. He published its photo on the journal of the Syrian Military Police and informed the Jordanian Department of Antiquities. The department assigned Jordanian archaeologist Rafiq al-Dajani the task of research and exploration in the cave. They found eight smaller sealed tombs inside the main cave, with the bones preserved inside.

== Association with religious lore ==
=== Surah "The Cave" ===
[Mention] when the youths retreated to the cave and said, 'Our Lord, grant us from Yourself mercy and prepare for us from our affair right guidance.' So We cast [a cover of sleep] over their ears within the cave for a number of years. Then We awakened them that We might show which of the two factions was most precise in calculating what [extent] they had remained in time. It is We who relate to you, [O Muhammad], their story in truth. Indeed, they were youths who believed in their Lord, and We increased them in guidance.

Some argue that the Cave of Seven Sleepers is the location referred to in Surah al-Kahf of the Qur'an. The surah is named after the Cave – al-Kahf – in honor of the alleged piety of the seven sleepers.

=== Grounds for identification ===
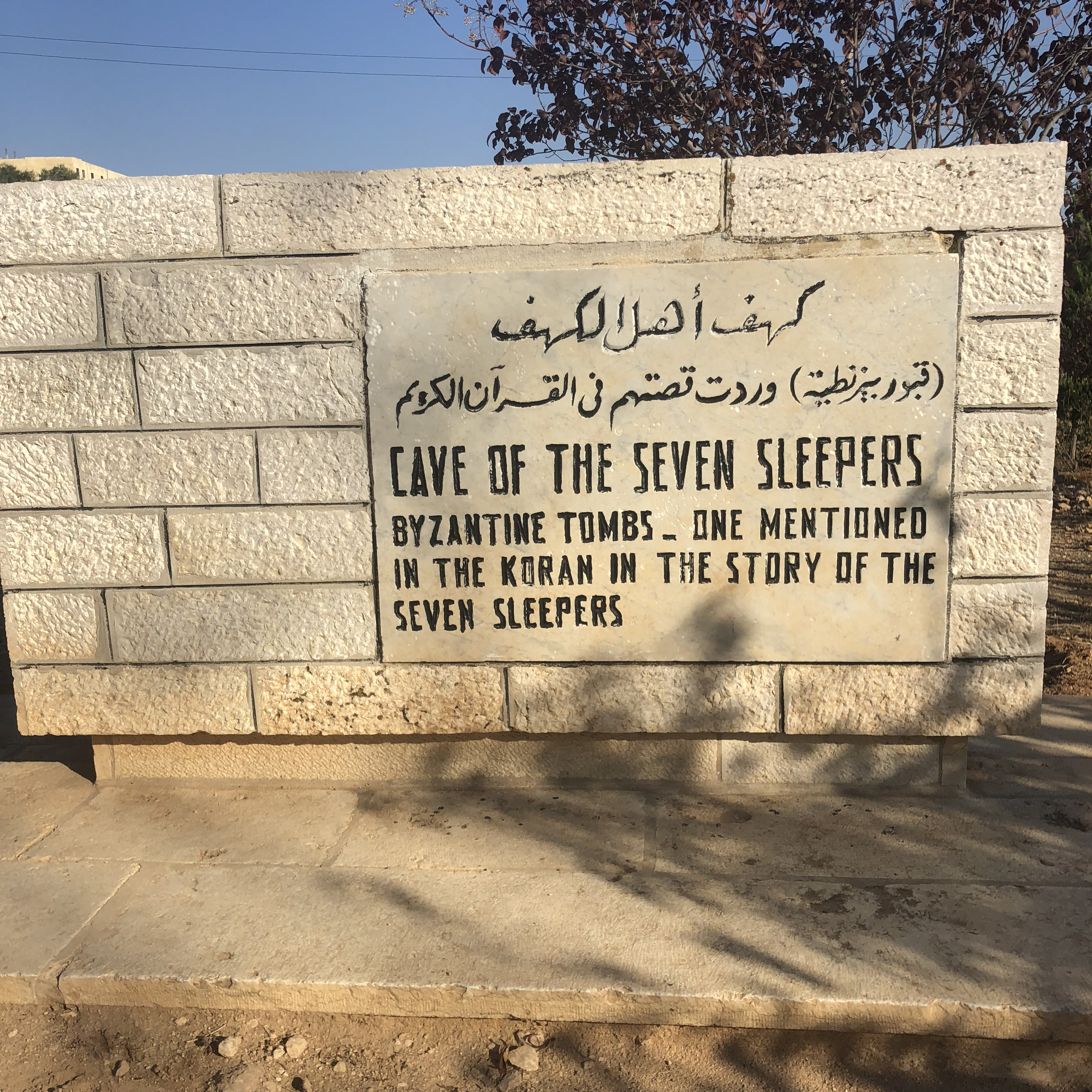
Sign at the Cave of the Seven Sleepers noting its mention in the Qur'an.

==== Early Muslim period ====
Muslim scholars, much like their Christian counterparts, have tried to place the narrative in a specific time and identify its location. The site in modern Jordan was favoured by al-Ṭabarī (d. 923) and al-Wāqidī (d. 823), with others preferring locations in Turkey.

==== 20th century ====
This cave was identified with the Qur'anic record due to the name of the nearby village, al-Rajib, which is etymologically similar to the word al-Raqīm mentioned in al-Kahf. Some also argue the site's correspondence with the Surat al-Kahf based on the finding of a dog's skull near the cave door.

The site's connection with Islamic heritage led to the participation of various Islamic leagues in its exploration and excavation.

Mount Qaysoun has also been a contender for the location of the cave; the old town has a gate which parallels the gate that was narrated in the story in which an apostle (presumed to be John) had refused to enter the city after having a requirement to prostrate to an idol in order to enter it. Then it was then reported that he went to a nearby bathhouse (bathhouses were also reported to be characteristic of Damascus) where he met and preached to the people who would be the people of the cave.

== Other contenders ==
There is no consensus on the location of the cave, Turkey alone having several contenders, starting with a traditional site near Ephesus, and there are more as far afield as Tunisia and even northwest China. Among the Turkish locations, the one on Mount Pion near Ephesus (Mount Coelian, Panayır Dağı in Turkish) near Afşin district deserves mention, as well as a second one in Tarsus.

For more see here.

== How to get there ==
The site is near the Sabah bus station and approximately a fifteen-minute bus ride from Amman's Wihdat Station.

== See also ==
- Al-Rajib: Rock-cut tombs near the Cave of the Seven Sleepers
- Rock-cut architecture
