= Seven Sleepers =

Christian and Muslim story

Saints Seven Sleepers
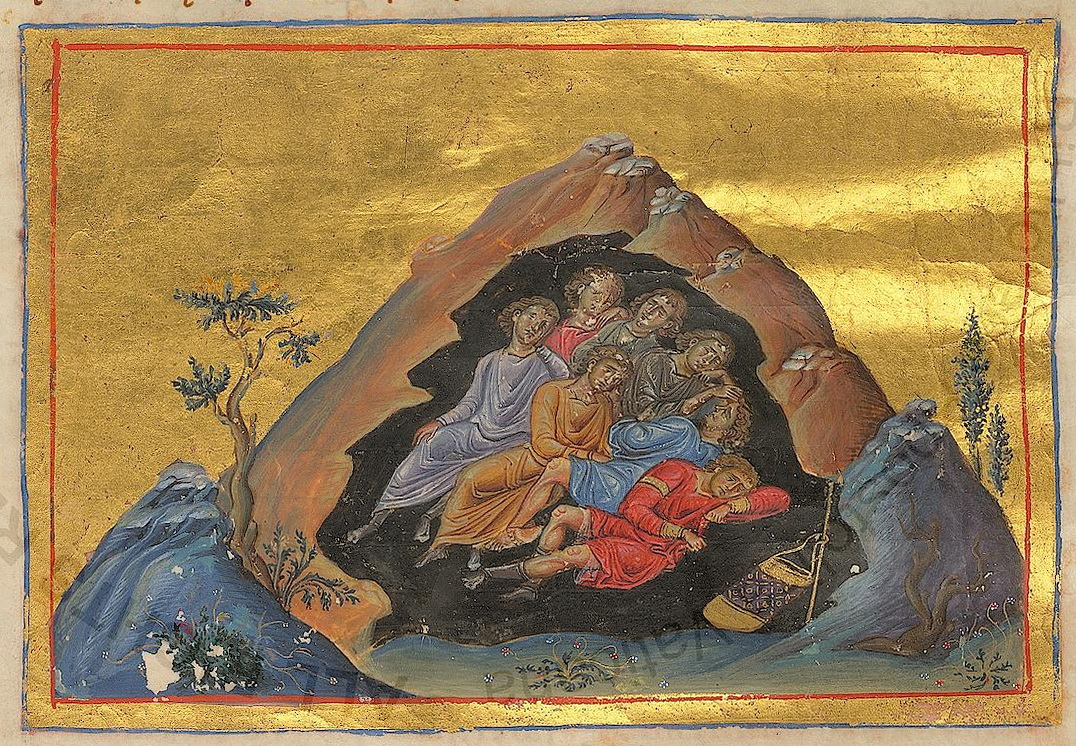
- Illustration from the Menologion of Basil II
- Born: unspecified; entered cave in 250
- Died: after exiting cave in 447
- Venerated in: Islam; Catholic Church; Eastern Orthodox Church; Oriental Orthodox Church
- Canonized: Pre-Congregation
- Feast: 27 July (Roman Catholic); 4 August, 22 October (Eastern Christianity)

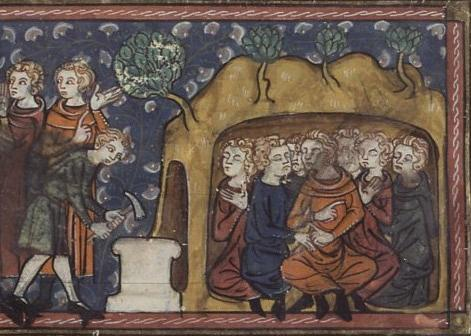
Decius orders the walling in of the Seven sleepers From a 14th-century manuscript.

The Seven Sleepers (Greek: ἑπτὰ κοιμώμενοι, romanized: hepta koimōmenoi; Latin: Septem dormientes), also known in Christianity as the Seven Sleepers of Ephesus, and in Islam as Aṣḥāb al-Kahf (اصحاب الکهف, aṣḥāb al-kahf, lit. Companions of the Cave), is a late antique Christian legend, and a Qur'anic Islamic story. It speaks about a group of youths who hid inside a cave around the year 250 AD to escape Roman persecutions of Christians and emerged many years later. The Qur'anic version of the story appears in Sura 18 (18:9–26).

The Seven Sleepers have been venerated as Christian saints since at least the 5th century as the "Holy Seven Youths" (Άγιοι Επτά Παίδες) in the Orthodox church; in the Catholic Church, they are venerated individually.

== Origins and propagation ==
The story appeared in several Syriac sources before Gregory of Tours's lifetime (538–594). The earliest Syriac manuscript copy is in MS Saint-Petersburg No. 4, which dates to the 5th century.

The earliest known version of this story is found in the writings of the Syriac bishop Jacob of Serugh (c. 450–521), who relies on an earlier Greek source, now lost. Jacob of Serugh, an Edessan poet-theologian, wrote a homily in verse on the subject of the Seven Sleepers, which was published in the Acta Sanctorum. Another sixth-century version gives eight sleepers in a Syrian manuscript in the British Museum (Cat. Syr. Mss, p. 1090).

Whether the original account was written in Syriac or Greek was debated, but today a Greek original is generally accepted. The pilgrim account De situ terrae sanctae, written between 518 and 531, records the existence of a church dedicated to the sleepers in Ephesus.

An outline of this tale appears in the 6th-century writings of Gregory of Tours and the History of the Lombards of Paul the Deacon (720–799). The best-known Western version of the story appears in Jacobus de Voragine's Golden Legend (1259–1266). It also appears in BHO (Pueri septem), BHG (Pueri VII) and BHL Dormientes (Septem) Ephesi.

Accounts of the Christian legend are found in at least nine medieval languages and preserved in over 200 manuscripts, mainly dating to between the 9th and 13th centuries. These include 104 Latin manuscripts, 40 Greek, 33 Arabic, 17 Syriac, six Ethiopic, five Coptic, two Armenian, one Middle Irish, and one Old English. Byzantine writer Symeon the Metaphrast (died c. 1000) alluded to it. It was also translated into Sogdian. In the 13th century, the poet Chardri composed an Old French version. The ninth-century Irish calendar Félire Óengusso commemorates the Seven Sleepers on 7 August.

The legend was also translated into Persian, Kyrgyz, and Tatar.

=== Dissemination in the West: story and relics ===
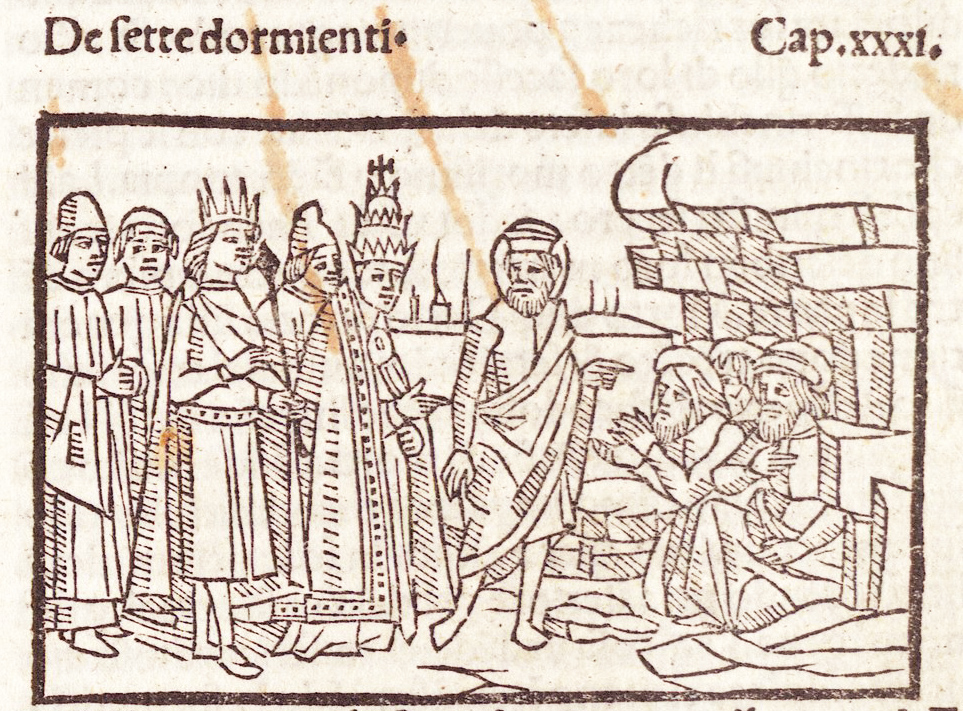
The Seven Sleepers in the Golden Legend (1497)

The story rapidly attained a wide diffusion throughout Christendom. It was popularized in the West by Gregory of Tours, in his late 6th-century collection of miracles, Glory of the Martyrs (De gloria martyrum). Gregory claimed to have gotten the story from "a certain Syrian interpreter" (Syro quidam interpretante), but this could refer to either a Syriac- or Greek-speaker from the Levant. During the period of the Crusades, bones from the sepulchres near Ephesus, identified as relics of the Seven Sleepers, were transported to Marseille, France, in a large stone coffin, which remained a trophy of the Abbey of St Victor, Marseille.

The Seven Sleepers were included in the Golden Legend compilation, the most popular book of the later Middle Ages, which fixed a precise date for their resurrection, AD 478, in the reign of Theodosius.

== Christian story ==
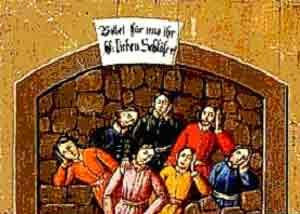
A 19th century German votive painting of the Seven Sleepers. The writing says Bittet für uns Ihr hl. sieben Schläfer (Pray for us, Holy Seven Sleepers).

The story says that during the persecutions by the Roman emperor Decius, around AD 250, seven young men were accused of following Christianity. They were given time to recant their faith but refused to bow to Roman idols. Instead, they chose to give their worldly goods to the poor and retire to a mountain cave to pray, where they fell asleep. The Emperor, seeing that their attitude towards paganism had not improved, ordered the mouth of the cave to be sealed.

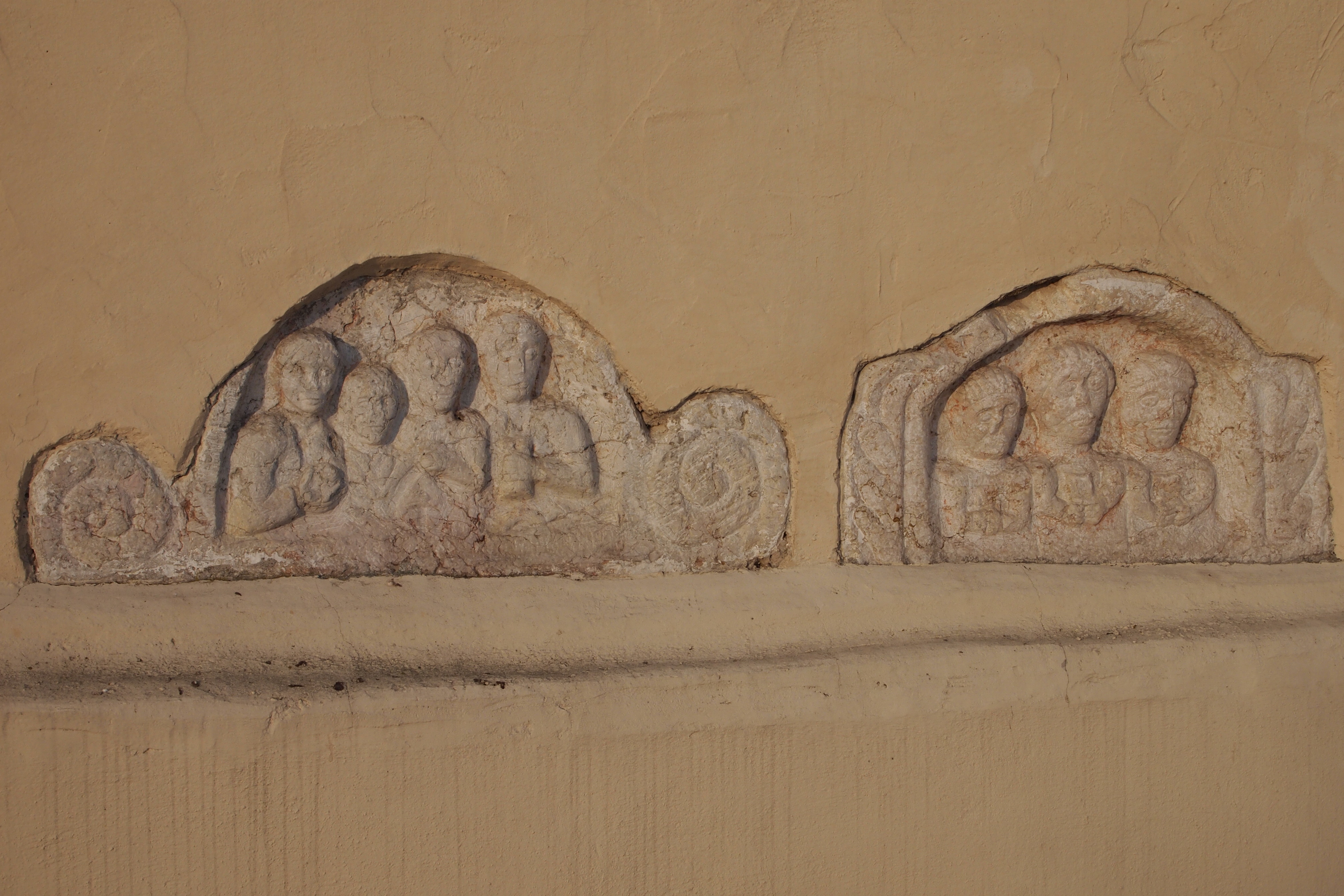
Roman headstones misinterpreted as to show the Seven Sleepers, in a Church in Rotthof, Germany, named after the legend

Decius died in 251, and many years passed during which Christianity went from being persecuted to being the state religion of the Roman Empire. At some later time—usually given as during the reign of Theodosius II (408–450)—in AD 447 when heated discussions were taking place between various schools of Christianity about the resurrection of the body in the day of judgement and life after death, a landowner decided to open up the sealed mouth of the cave, thinking to use it as a cattle pen. He opened it and found the sleepers inside. They awoke, imagining that they had slept but one day, and sent one of their number to Ephesus to buy food, with instructions to be careful.

Upon arriving in the city, this person was astounded to find buildings with crosses attached; the townspeople were astounded to find a man trying to spend old coins from the reign of Decius. The bishop was summoned to interview the sleepers; they told him their miracle story, and died praising God.

The Seven Sleepers' various lives in Greek and other non-Latin languages are listed at BHO.

== Islamic story ==
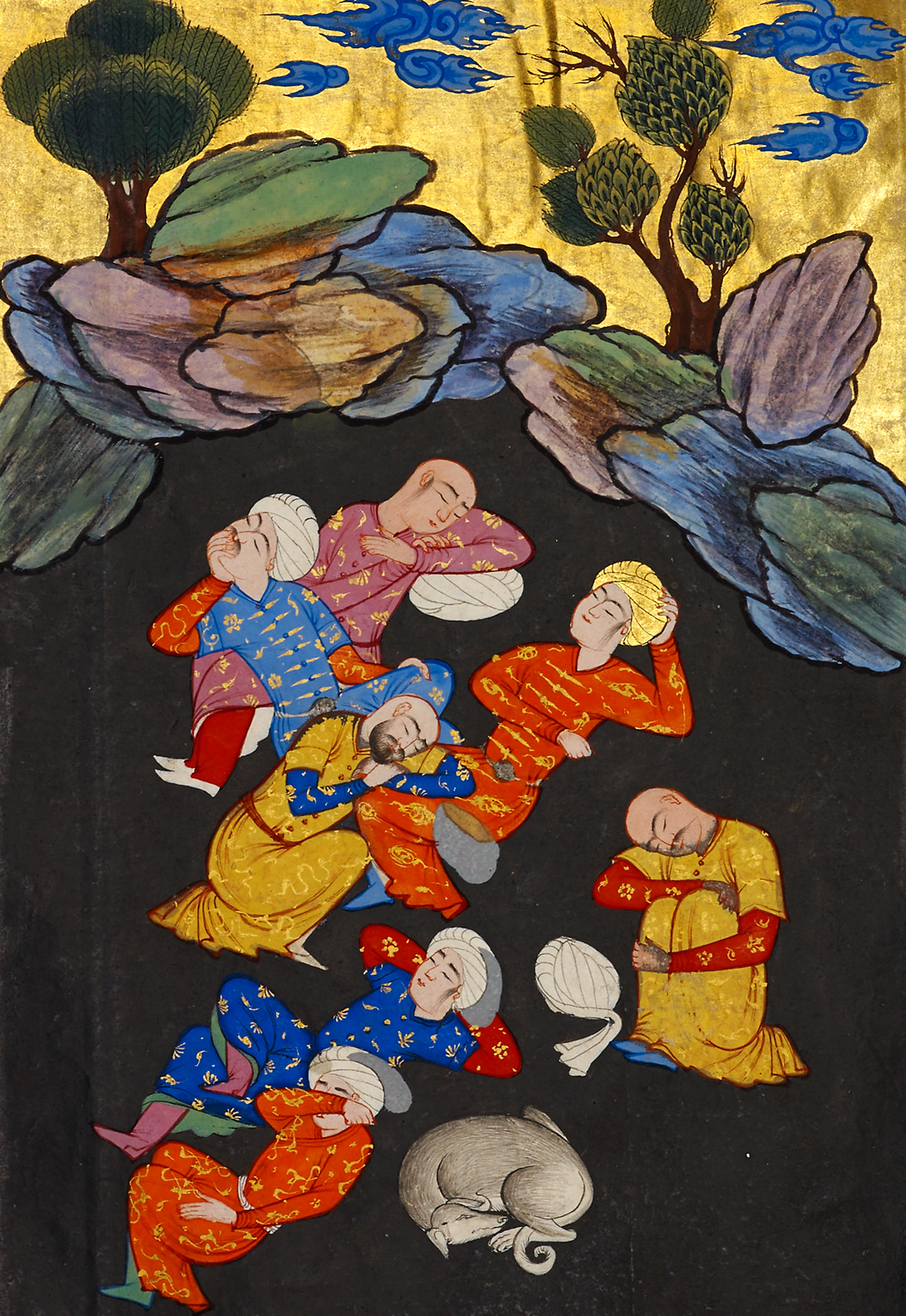
Islamic Persian miniature of the Sleepers from a 1577 Stories of the Prophets manuscript.

Al-Kahf (Arabic: الكهف, lit. 'the Cave') is the 18th chapter (sūrah) of the Qur'an with 110 verses (āyāt). Regarding the timing and contextual background of the revelation (asbāb al-nuzūl), it is an earlier Meccan surah, which means it was revealed before Muhammad's hijrah to Medina instead of after. It is the midst sura of Qur'an having the midst word "walyatalattaf" (وَلْيَتَلَطَّفْ), meaning "let him be kind".

The precise number of sleepers is not stated. The Qur'an furthermore states that people started to make "idle guesses" as to how many people were in the cave shortly after the incident emerged. To this, the Qur'an asserts, "My Sustainer knows best how many they were.". However, it has been suggested to have been seven like the other Greek legends suggest, with the noted that it was one of the views of the sects of Christians at Najran, Arabia. Tafsir Ibn Kathir mentions narrations from several companions of the Prophet saying they were the ones who knew the real number, and said it was seven, so it is unanimously agreed by most exegetes in Sunni Islam as the number being seven sleepers with the dog being the eighth. Similarly, regarding the exact period of time the people stayed in the cave, the Qur'an, after asserting the guesswork of the people that "they remained in the cave for 300 years and nine added," resolves that "God knows best how long they remained [there]." The 9 years are often interpreted as the difference between solar and lunar years. The Qur'an says that the sleepers included a dog, which Islamic tradition names as Qitmir, who guarded the entrance of the cave (verse 18).

== Number and names ==
=== Jewish and Christian versions ===
Early versions do not all agree on or even specify the number of sleepers. Some Jewish circles and the Christians of Najran believed in only three brothers; the East Syriac, five. Most Syriac accounts have eight, including a nameless watcher whom God sets over the sleepers. A 6th-century Latin text titled "Pilgrimage of Theodosius" featured the sleepers as seven people in number, with a dog named Viricanus.

Bartłomiej Grysa lists at least seven different sets of names for the sleepers:

- Maximian, Martinian, Dionisius, John, Constantine, Malchus, Serapion
- Maximilian, Martinian, Dionisius, John, Constantine, Malkhus, Serapion, Anthony
- Maximilian, Martinian, Dionisius, John, Constantine, Yamblikh (Iamblichus), Anthony
- Makṯimilīnā (Maksimilīnā, Maḥsimilīnā), Marnūš (Marṭūs), Kafašṭaṭyūš (Ksōṭōnos), Yamlīḫā (Yamnīḫ), Mišlīnā, Saḏnūš, Dabranūš (Bīrōnos), Samōnos, Buṭōnos, Qālos (according to aṭ-Ṭabarī and ad-Damīrī)
- Achillides, Probatus, Stephanus, Sambatus, Quiriacus, Diogenus, Diomedes (according to Gregory of Tours)
- Ikilios, Fruqtis, Istifanos, Sebastos, Qiryaqos, Dionisios (according to Michael the Syrian)
- Aršellītīs, Probatios, Sabbastios, Stafanos, Kīriakos, Diōmetios, Avhenios (according to the Coptic version)

In the modern Orthodox Church, they are named

- Μαξιμιλιανός (Maximilian), Ἰάμβλιχος (Iamblichus), Μαρτινιανός (Martinian), Διονύσιος (Dionysius), Ἀντωνῖνος (Antoninus) (or Ἰωάννης (John)), Κωνσταντῖνος (Constantine), and Ἐξακουστοδιανός (Exacoustodian);

and in the modern Catholic Church, as

- Maximianus, Malchus, Martinianus, Dionysius, Joannes, Serapion, and Constantinus.*

=== Islamic view ===
The Qur'an does not state the exact number of sleepers in the cave. Qur'an 18:22 discusses the disputes regarding their numbers. The verse says:

Some will say, "They were three, their dog was the fourth," while others will say, "They were five, their dog was the sixth," only guessing blindly. And others will say, "They were seven and their dog was the eighth." Say, O Prophet, "My Lord knows best their exact number. Only a few people know as well." So do not argue about them except with sure knowledge, nor consult any of those who debate about them.

Some Islamic exegetical traditions report that the People of the Cave were seven. Reports attributed to Ibn Abbas state that he was among those who knew their number and that they were seven. Ibn Kathir. "Surah Al-Kahf (18:22)". Tafsir Ibn Kathir.

== Duration ==
=== Christian accounts ===
The number of years the sleepers slept also varies between accounts. The highest number, given by Gregory of Tours, was 373 years. Some accounts have 372. Jacobus de Voragine calculated it at 196 (from the year 252 until 448). Other calculations suggest 195.

== Caves of the Seven Sleepers ==
Several sites are attributed as the "Cave of the Seven Sleepers," but none could empirically prove to be the original site associated with the legend. As the earliest versions of the legend spread out from Ephesus, an early Christian catacomb in that area came to be associated with it, attracting scores of pilgrims. On the slopes of Mount Pion (Mount Coelian) near Ephesus (near modern Selçuk in Turkey), the grotto of the Seven Sleepers with ruins of the religious site built over it was excavated in 1926–1928. The excavation brought to light several hundred graves dated to the 5th and 6th centuries. Inscriptions dedicated to the Seven Sleepers were found on the walls and in the graves. This grotto is still shown to tourists.

Other possible sites of the cave of the Seven Sleepers are in Damascus, Syria and Afşin and Tarsus, Turkey. Afşin is near the antique Roman city of Arabissus, to which the East Roman Emperor Justinian paid a visit. The site was a Hittite temple, used as a Roman temple and later as a church in Roman and Byzantine times. The Emperor brought marble niches from Western Anatolia as gifts for it, which are preserved inside the Eshab-ı Kehf Kulliye mosque to this day. The Seljuks continued to use the place of worship as a church and a mosque. It was turned into a mosque over time, with the conversion of the local population to Islam.

A cave near Amman, Jordan, also known as the Cave of Seven Sleepers, which has eight smaller sealed tombs inside and a ventilation duct coming out of the cave.

=== List of notable sites ===
==== West Asia ====
- Eshab-ı Kehf Cave , Ephesus, Turkey
- Eshab-ı Kehf Cave, Tarsus, Turkey
- Grotto of the Seven Sleepers, İzmir, Turkey
- Eshab-ı Kehf Kulliye, outside Afşin, Turkey
- Ashabi-Kahf in Nakhchivan, Nakhchivan Autonomous Republic of Azerbaijan
- Mar Musa, monastery in Syria
- Mount Qasioun, Damascus, Syria
- Cave of the Seven Sleepers, Al-Rajeb (Greater Amman), Jordan
- Ed-Deir, Petra

==== North Africa ====
- Mosquée de Sept Dormants, Chenini, Tunisia

=== Gallery ===
Caves regarded as the cave from the story of the Seven Sleepers

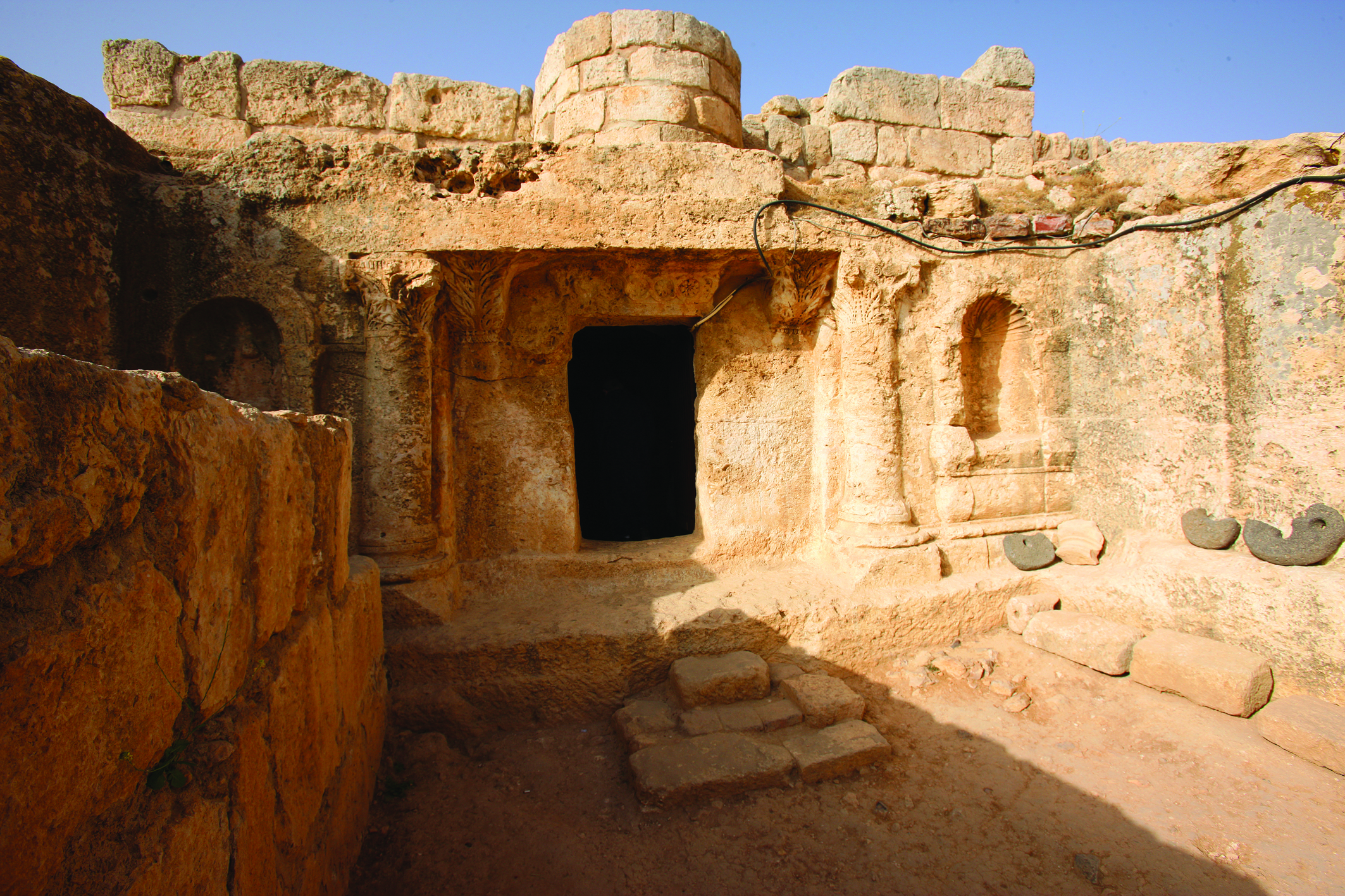
Entrance to the cave, near Amman, Jordan

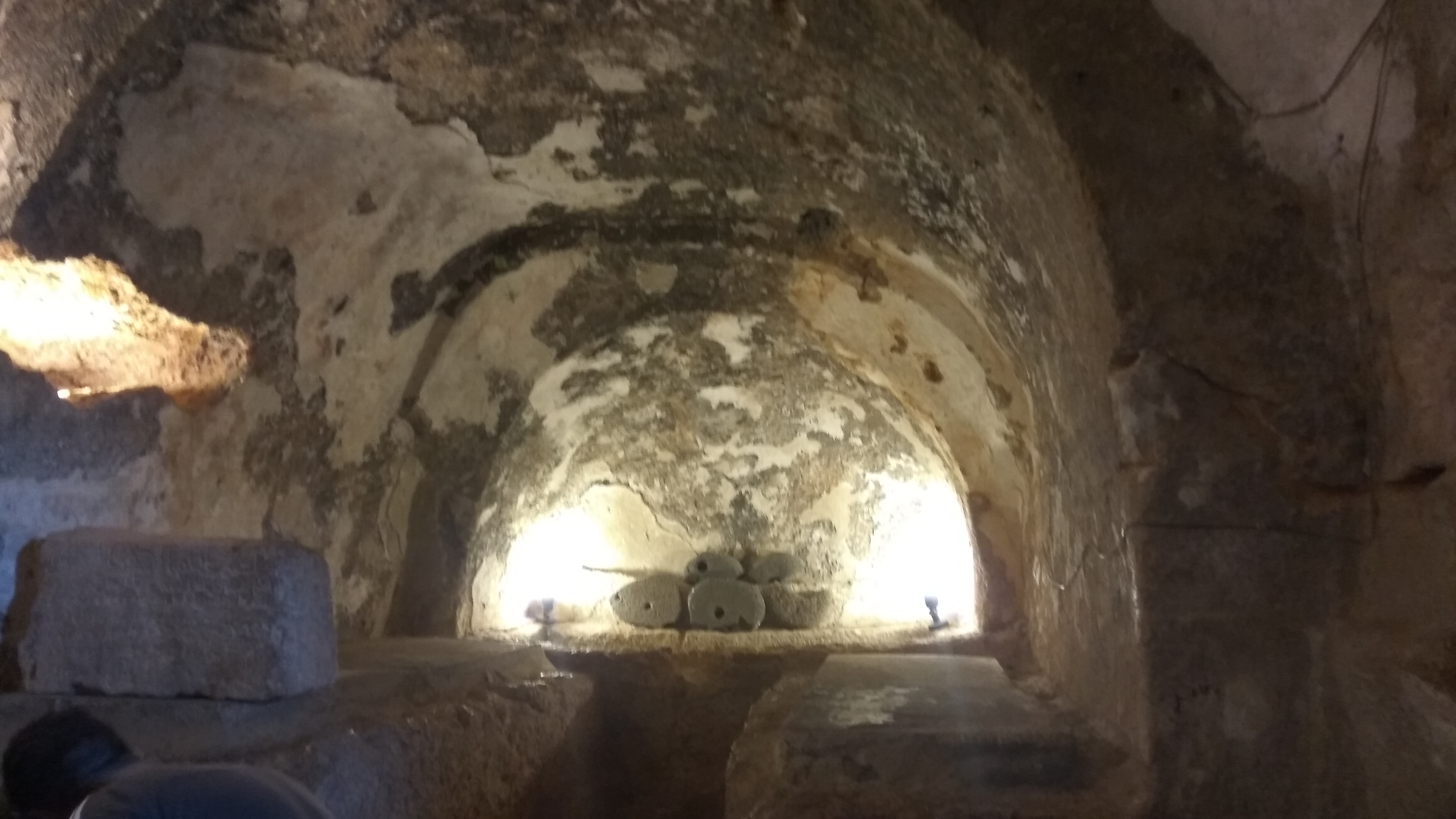
Graves in the Cave of the Seven Sleepers, Jordan

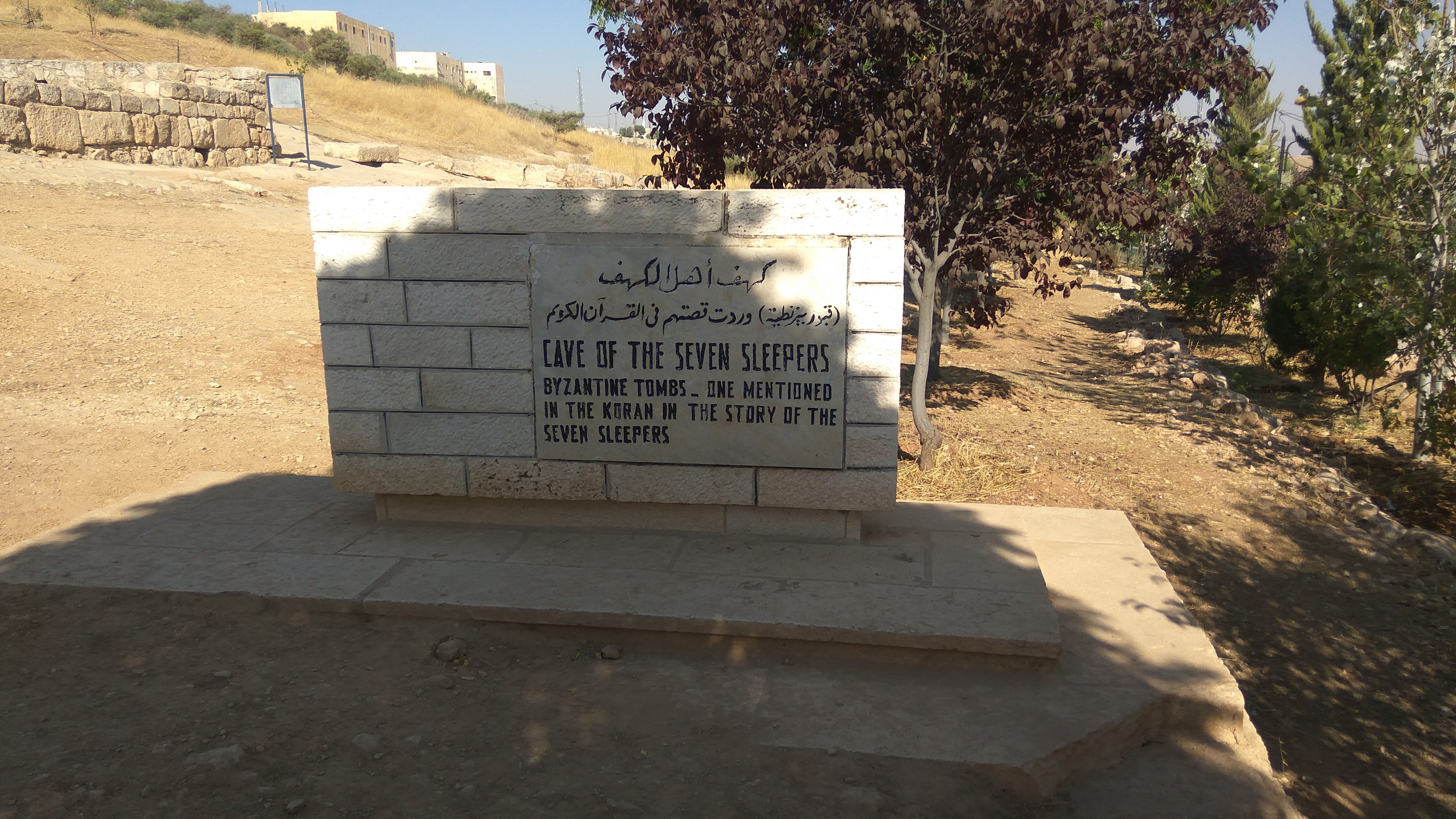
Nameplate of the cave, Jordan

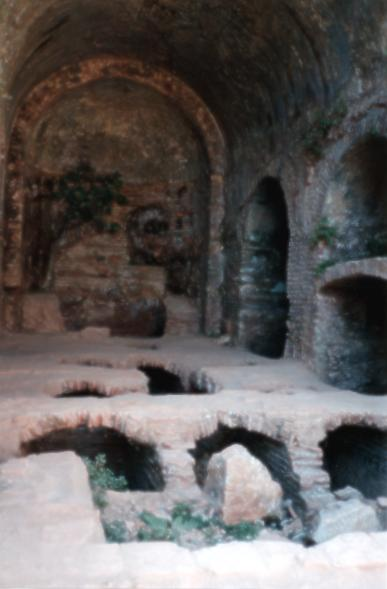
The cave in Ephesus, Turkey

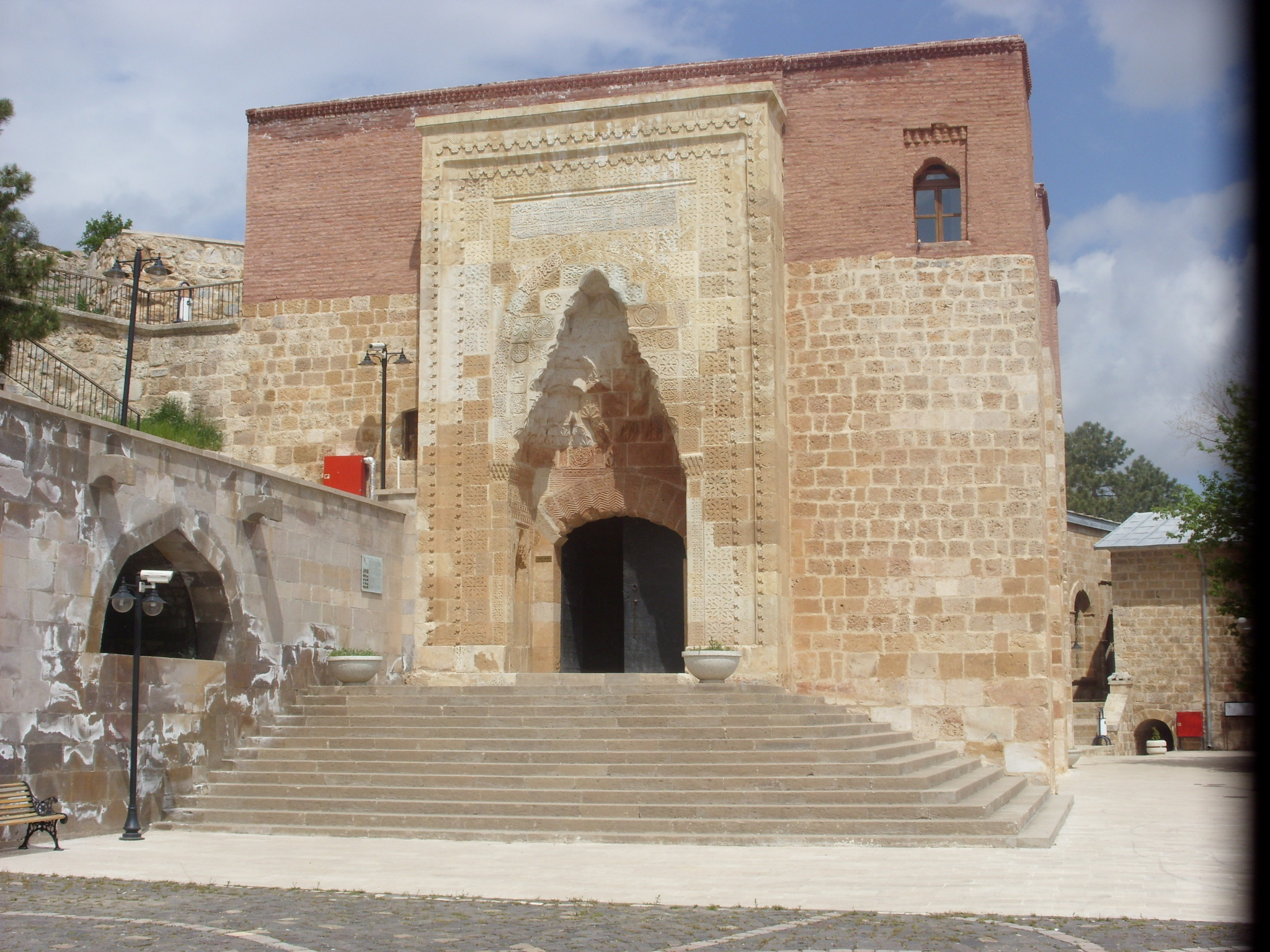
Eshab-ı Kehf Kulliye in Afşin with the cave inside, Turkey

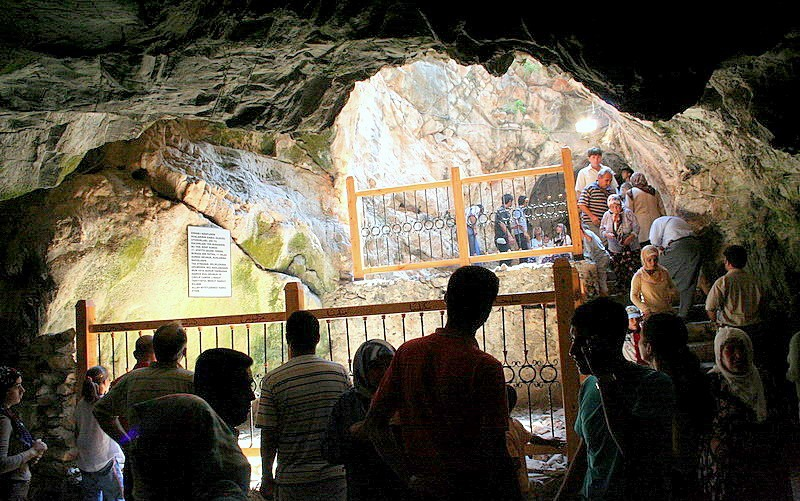
Eshab-ı Kehf Cave in Tarsus, Turkey

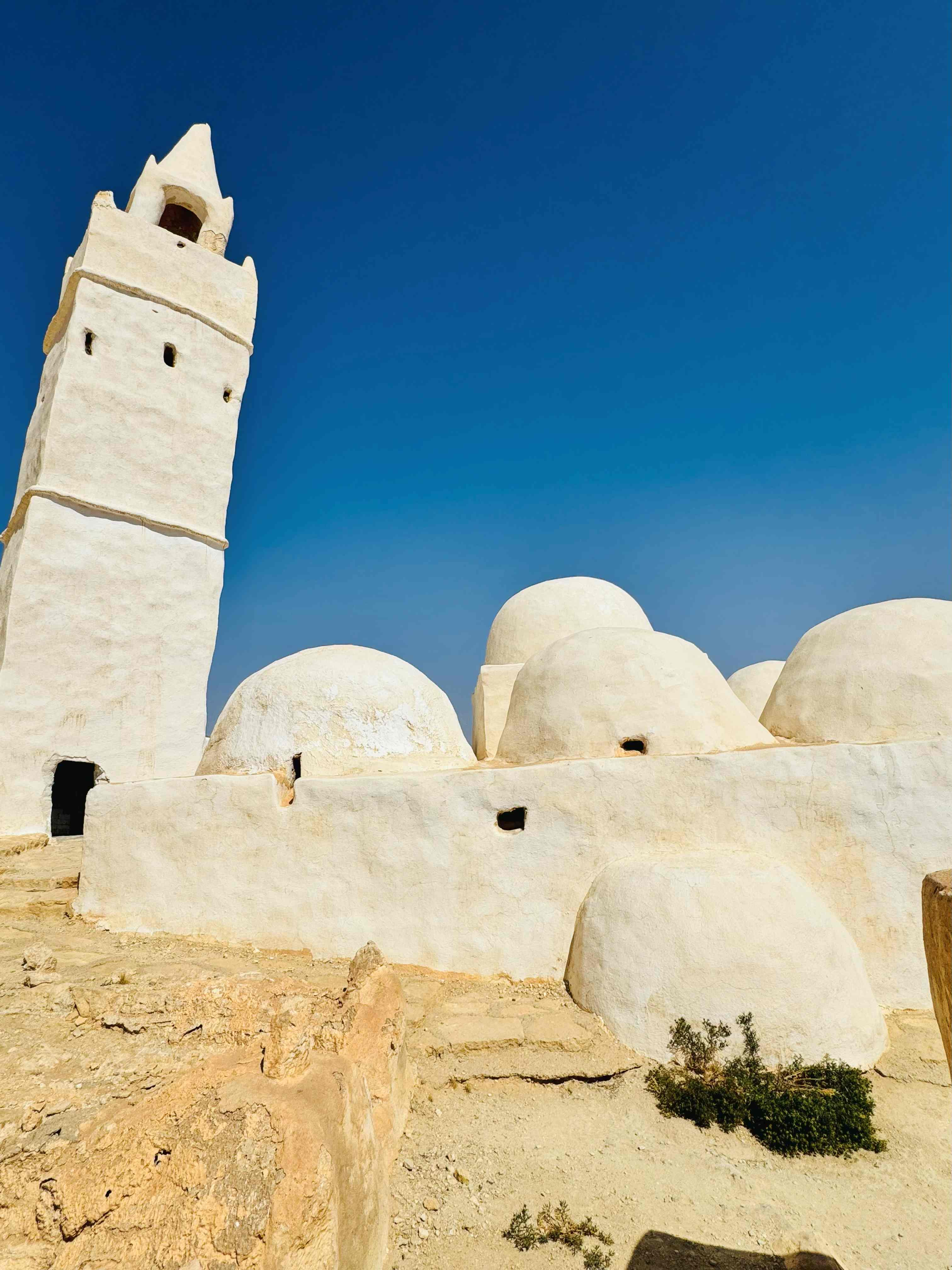
Graves and minaret of Mosquée de Sept Dormants in Chenini, Tunisia

== Modern literature ==
=== Early modern ===
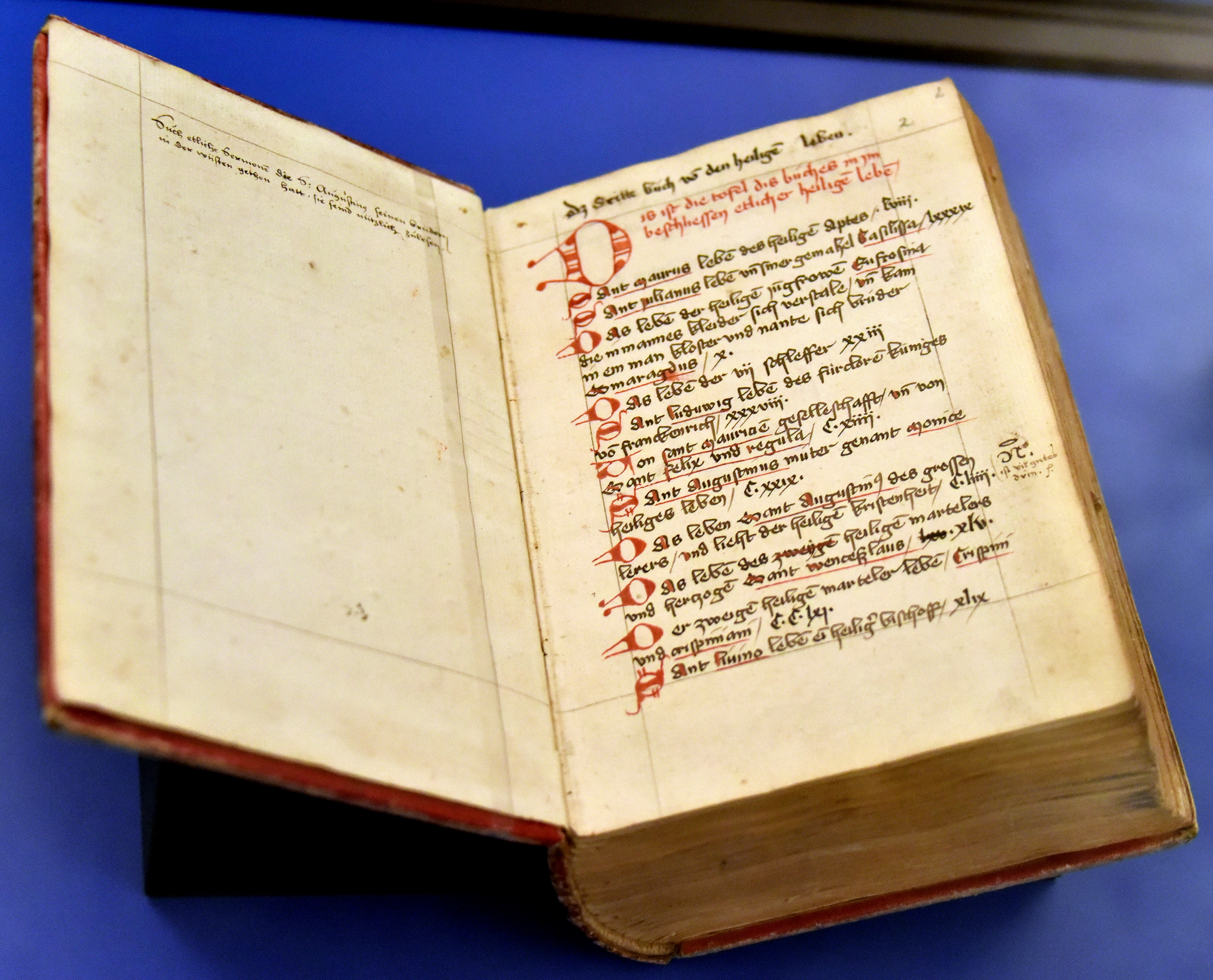
The famous German story of the collection "Life of the Saints" (Der Heiligen Leben), including the legend of "the Seven Sleepers," 15th century, Germany

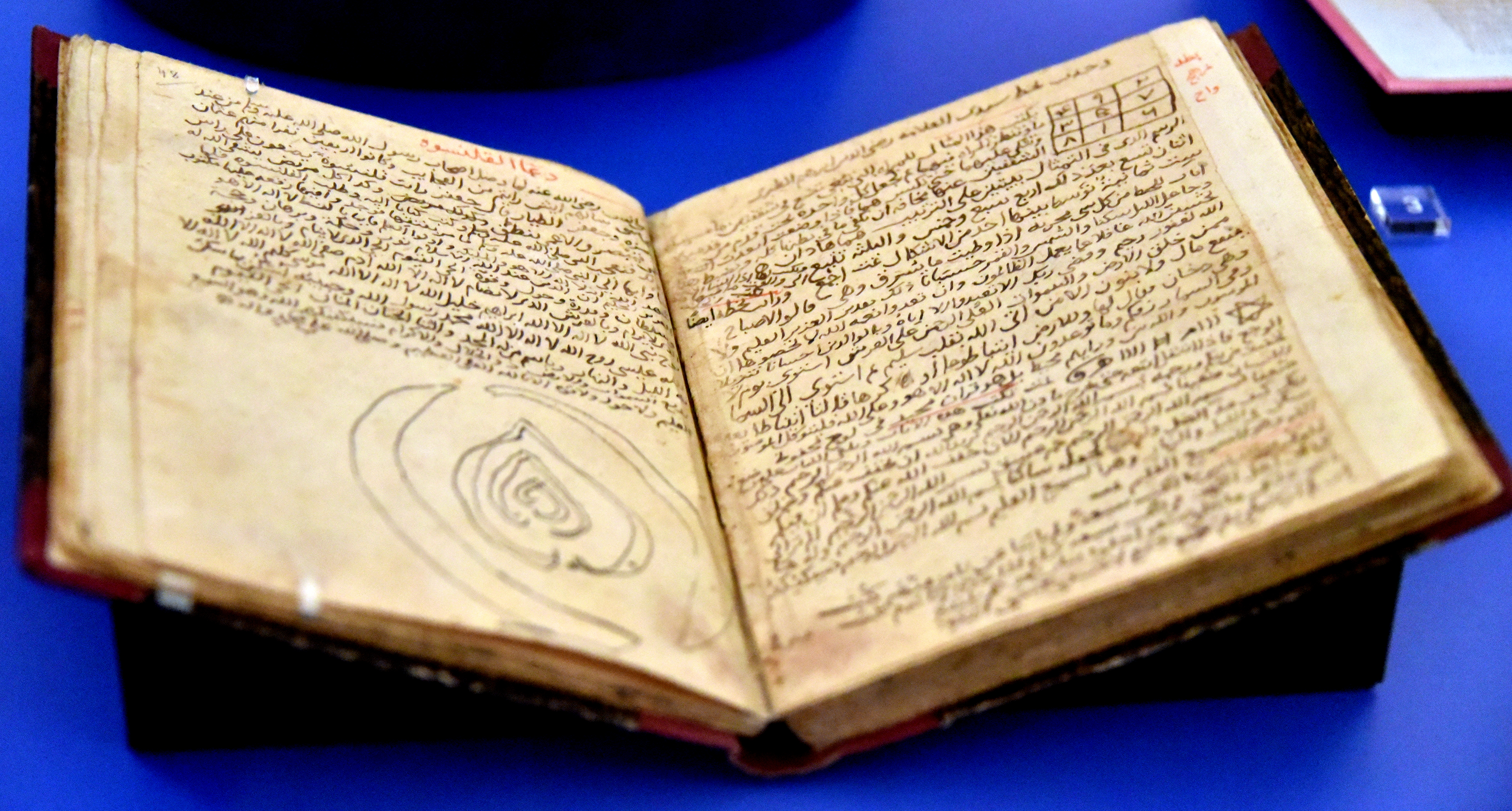
The Arabic story of the Companions of the Cave (Seven Sleepers; Qissat Ahl el-Kahaf), 1494, origin unknown

The account had become proverbial in 16th-century Protestant culture. The poet John Donne could ask,

I wonder, by my troth, what thou and I
Did, till we loved? Were we not weaned till then?
But sucked on country pleasures, childishly?
Or snorted we in the Seven Sleepers' den?—John Donne, "The Good-Morrow".

In John Heywood's Play called the Four PP (1530s), the Pardoner, a Renaissance update of the protagonist in Chaucer's "The Pardoner's Tale," offers his companions the opportunity to kiss "a slipper / Of one of the Seven Sleepers." Still, the relic is presented as absurdly as the Pardoner's other offerings, which include "the great-toe of the Trinity" and "a buttock-bone of Pentecost."

Little is heard of the Seven Sleepers during the Enlightenment, but the account revived with the coming of Romanticism. The Golden Legend may have been the source for retellings of the Seven Sleepers in Thomas de Quincey's Confessions of an English Opium-Eater, in a poem by Goethe, Washington Irving's "Rip van Winkle," and H. G. Wells's The Sleeper Awakes. It also might influence the motif of the "King asleep in mountain." Mark Twain did a burlesque of the story of the Seven Sleepers in Chapter 13 of Volume 2 of The Innocents Abroad.

=== Contemporary ===
Edward Gibbon gives different accounts of the story in The History of the Decline and Fall of the Roman Empire.

The Serbian writer Danilo Kiš retells the story of the Seven Sleepers in a short story, "The Legend of the Sleepers," from his book The Encyclopedia of the Dead.

The Italian author Andrea Camilleri incorporates the story in his novel The Terracotta Dog in which the protagonist is led to a cave containing the titular watchdog (as described in the Qur'an and called "Kytmyr" in Sicilian folklore) and the saucer of silver coins with which one of the sleepers is to buy "pure food" from the bazaar in Ephesus (Qur'an 18.19). The Seven Sleepers are symbolically replaced by lovers Lisetta Moscato and Mario Cunich, who were killed in their nuptial bed by an assassin hired by Lisseta's incestuous father and later laid to rest in a cave in the Sicilian countryside.

In Susan Cooper's The Dark Is Rising series, Will Stanton awakens the Seven Sleepers in The Grey King, and in Silver on the Tree, they ride in the last battle against the Dark.

The Seven Sleepers series by Gilbert Morris takes a modern approach to the story in which seven teenagers must be awakened to fight evil in a post-nuclear-apocalypse world.

John Buchan refers to the Seven Sleepers in The Three Hostages, in which Richard Hannay surmises that his wife Mary, a sound sleeper, is descended from one of the seven who has married one of the Foolish Virgins.

The Seven Sleepers are mentioned in the "Les Invisibles" song on the 1988 Blue Öyster Cult album Imaginos.

Several languages have idioms related to the Seven Sleepers, including:

- Hungarian: hétalvó, literally a "seven-sleeper," or "one who sleeps for an entire week," is a colloquial reference to a person who oversleeps or who is typically drowsy.
- Irish: "Na seacht gcodlatáin" refers to hibernating animals.
- Norwegian: a late riser may be referred to as a syvsover ("seven sleeper")
- Swedish: a late riser may be referred to as a sjusovare ("seven sleeper").
- Welsh: a late riser may be referred to as a saith cysgadur ("seven sleeper") – as in the 1885 novel Rhys Lewis by Daniel Owen, where the protagonist is referred to as such in chapter 37, p. 294 (Hughes a'i Fab, Caerdydd, 1948).

== Feast day ==
The most recent edition of the Roman Martyrology commemorates the Seven Sleepers of Ephesus under the date of 27 July. The Byzantine calendar commemorates them with feasts on 4 August and 22 October. Syriac Orthodox calendars gives various dates: 21 April, 2 August, 13 August, 23 October and 24 October.

== Pop culture ==
The Men of Angelos, also known as The Companions of the Cave, is a 1997 Iranian television series directed by Farajollah Salahshoor. It depicts the story of the Seven Sleepers, according to the Qur'an.

== See also ==
- Epimenides
- King asleep in mountain
- Rip Van Winkle
- Seven Sleepers' Day
- The Three Sleepers: characters in the C. S. Lewis children's novel The Voyage of the Dawn Treader

== Bibliography ==
- Ælfric of Eynsham (1881). "Of the Seven Sleepers" . Ælfric's Lives of Saints. London, Pub. for the Early English text society, by N. Trübner & co.
- Gennaro Zurolo (2013). Regesto del documento d'archivio del XVIII secolo riguardante la cappella gentilizia della famiglia Pisacane sotto il titolo di S. Maria di Montevergine [Register of the 18th century archive document regarding the noble chapel of the Pisacane family under the title of S. Maria di Montevergine] (in Latin and Italian). Angri (SA): Panacèa Onlus.
