= The Good-Morrow =

Poem from 1633 by John Donne

- by John Donne
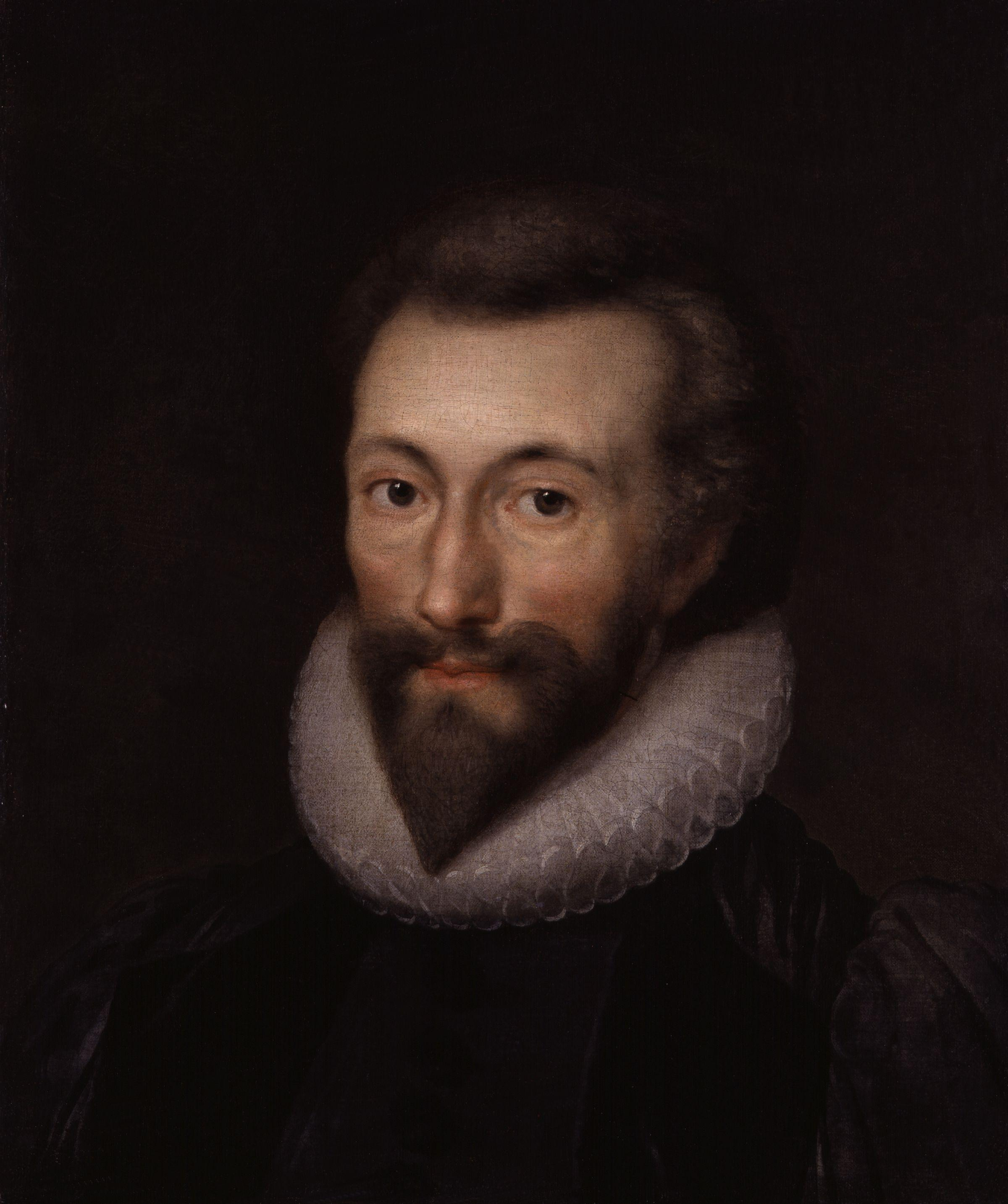
- John Donne, who wrote "The Good-Morrow"
- Country: Kingdom of England
- Language: English language
- Publication date: 1633

"The Good-Morrow" is a poem by John Donne, published in his 1633 collection Songs and Sonnets.

Written while Donne was a student at Lincoln's Inn, the poem is one of his earliest works and is thematically considered to be the "first" work in Songs and Sonnets. Although referred to as a sonnet, the work does not follow the most common rhyming scheme of such works—a 14-line poem, consisting of an eight-line stanza followed by a six-line conclusion—but is instead 21 lines long, divided into three stanzas. "The Good-Morrow" is written from the point of view of an awaking lover and describes the lover's thoughts as he wakes next to his partner. The lover's musings move from discussing sensual love to spiritual love as he realises that, with spiritual love, the couple are liberated from fear and the need to seek adventure. The poem makes use of biblical and Catholic writings, indirectly referencing the legend of the Seven Sleepers and Paul the Apostle's description of divine, agapic love – two concepts with which, as a practising Catholic, Donne would have been familiar.

Donne's cartographic references in the third stanza have been the subject of much analysis, although academics have differed in their interpretation of their meaning and what the lines reference. Robert L. Sharp argues that these references can be logically interpreted as yet another reference to love; the maps with which Donne would have been familiar were not the Mercator-style maps that are common in the modern era, but instead cordiform maps, which appear in the shape of a heart and allow for the display of multiple worlds, which Donne alludes to in lines 11 to 18. Julia M. Walker, while noting that Sharp's work is "essential to an intelligent discussion of this extended image", disagrees with his conclusions and argues that Donne is actually referring to a map showing one world.

== Background and structure ==
Poet John Donne was born on 21 January 1572 to John Donne, a wealthy ironmonger and one of the wardens of the Worshipful Company of Ironmongers, and his wife Elizabeth. After his father's death when he was four, Donne, instead of being prepared to enter a trade, was trained as a gentleman scholar; his family used the money his father had made from ironmongering to hire private tutors who trained him in grammar, rhetoric, mathematics, history and foreign languages. Elizabeth was soon remarried to a wealthy doctor, ensuring that the family remained comfortable; as a result, despite being the son of an ironmonger and portraying himself in his early poetry as an outsider, Donne refused to accept that he was anything other than a gentleman. After study at Hart Hall, Oxford, Donne's private education eventually saw him study at Lincoln's Inn, one of the Inns of Court, where he occupied his time with history, poetry, theology and "Humane learning and languages". It was at Lincoln's Inn that Donne first began writing poetry, looking upon it as "a life-sign or minor irritation" rather than something which defined him. This early poetry included "The Good-Morrow" as well as many other works which later went on to comprise his collection Songs and Sonnets, published in 1633, two years after his death; "The Good-Morrow" is considered, in terms of its theme and maturity, to be the first of this collection's poems.

Sonnets are, canonically, poems of 14 lines with assorted rhyming schemes. Originating in the 14th century works of Petrarch, the most common form of the sonnet is known as the Italian Sonnet: a stanza of eight lines in which the writer lays out a complex thought, followed by a pause and a six-line conclusion "which is characteristically both unpredictable and intense". This was interlinked with the idea of courtly love, in which the goal of a romance is not simply passion, but a more significant moral perfection. "The Good-Morrow", although identified by Donne as a sonnet, does not follow this structural layout, although it does follow the thematic one; Donne used "sonnet" simply to refer to any piece of love poetry, ignoring the fact that "The Good-Morrow" was a 21-line work divided into three stanzas.

== Poem ==
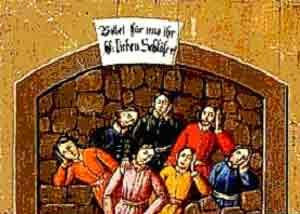
A 19th-century German painting of the Seven Sleepers, a Catholic legend Donne references in the opening lines of the poem.

The poem opens with a reference to a Catholic legend as Donne says:

I Wonder by my troth, what thou, and I
Did, till we lov'd? were we not wean'd till then?
But suck'd on country pleasures, childishly?
Or snorted we in the Seven Sleepers' den?
'Twas so; but this, all pleasures fancies be.
If ever any beauty I did see,
Which I desired, and got, 'twas but a dream of thee.

— Stanza 1 (lines 1–7)

This refers to the Seven Sleepers, the Catholic legend of seven Christian children, persecuted for their faith during the reign of the Roman emperor Decius, who fled to the shelter of a cave where they slept for more than 200 years. Donne, one of six or seven children and a baptised Catholic during a time of strong anti-Catholic sentiment from both the populace and the government, would certainly have been familiar with the story.

And now good morrow to our waking souls,
Which watch not one another out of fear;
For love, all love of other sights controls,
And makes one little room, an everywhere.
Let sea-discoverers to new worlds have gone,
Let maps to other, worlds on worlds have shown;
Let us possess one world, each hath one, and is one.

— Stanza 2 (lines 8–14)

In this passage, the speaker experiences a sense of wonder, having awoken in bed with his lover; he makes the discovery that their love makes finding "new worlds" pale in importance. "[S]ouls" also awake, not just bodies, "as if called by love from the sleep of ordinary life and mere lust".

My face in thine eye, thine in mine appears,
And true plain hearts do in the faces rest;
Where can we find two better hemispheres
Without sharp north, without declining west?
Whatever dies, was not mixed equally;

— Stanza 3 (lines 15–19)

This passage shows the speaker communicating to his lover that they have proceeded from their former "childish" pleasures to this moment, where their souls have finally awakened; something "miraculous" has happened, because the speaker feels the sort of love that Paul the Apostle claimed would only be encountered in heaven.

If our two loves be one, or, thou and I
Love so alike, that none do slacken, none can die.

— Stanza 3 (lines 20-21)

While the version found in Songs and Sonnets includes this passage as the last two lines, other manuscripts and a later volume of poetry give the last lines as, "If our two loves be one, both thou and I/Love just alike in all, none of these loves can die".

== Themes ==
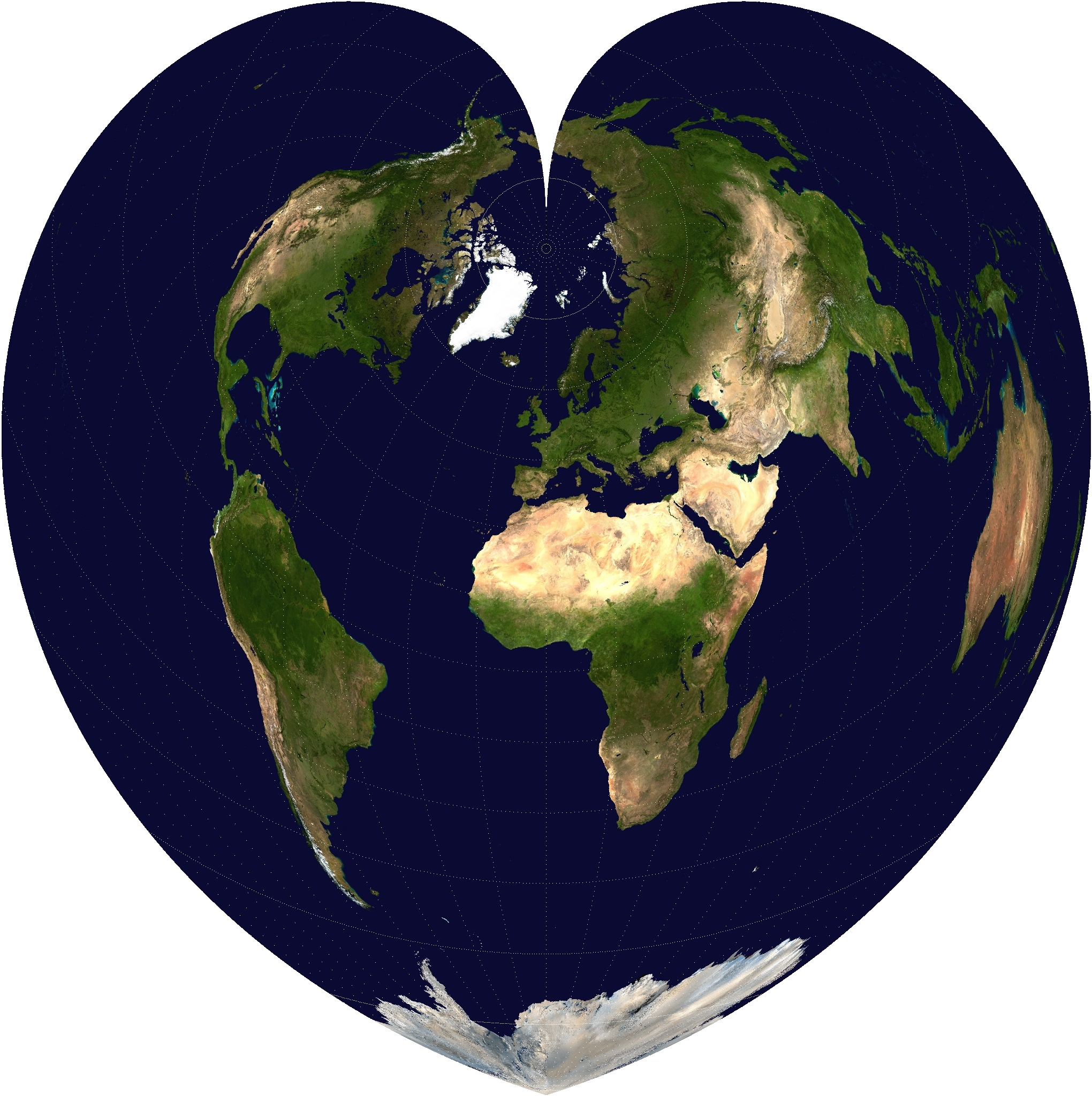
A cordiform map, which resembles a heart shape; it is with this style of map that Donne would have been familiar when making cartographic references in the third stanza.

A love poem, "The Good-Morrow" is thematically centred on several concepts. The poem is primarily to do with evolving love; the movement from pure lust, in the first stanza, to a nascent and evolving spirituality which liberates the lovers because they no longer "watch each other out of fear" but can instead see clearly. The lovers' faith in each other allows them to be brave, unlike the Seven Sleepers, who were forced out of fear to hide their beliefs; with love, the lovers can allow others to pursue their own dreams, accepting that "Let us possess one world; each hath one, and is one" – with each other, there is no need to search further for adventure. Harold Bloom notes the intertwining of both sensual and spiritual love, arguing that Donne is suggesting that it is impossible for those buried in sensual love, "busying themselves in mundane matters", to experience true love. Donne's emphasis on the importance of spiritual love can be seen from the biblical allusions; Achsah Guibbory states that the tone and wording of the poem is an intentional reference to Paul the Apostle's description of divine, agapic love; "At moments like these...eros merges with agape. Walls collapse, the veil parts, we know as we are known; our deepest, truest selves exposed". Alfred W. Satterthwaite, writing in The Explicator, argues that the story of the Seven Sleepers itself contains this theme; in the story, the Sleepers awoke to find themselves "thunderstruck" in their new environment, something analogous to "the radiant revelation love grants to the lovers in the poem".

Some scholars, such as William Empson, maintain that the poem also indicates that Donne seriously believed in separate planets and planes, and also the existence of more than one Christ – a belief that Donne later abandoned. Academics also see the poem as a more general allegory of the evolution of minds from childishness, as typified by the first stanza where the lovers "suck'd on country pleasures, childishly", towards a more mature form of love. Much has also been made of Donne's references to compasses and maps in the third stanza. Robert L. Sharp, writing in Modern Language Notes, argues that these references can be logically interpreted as yet another reference to love. The maps Donne would have been familiar with are not the Mercator-style maps, but instead cordiform maps, which appear in the shape of a heart. More than simply heart-shaped, cordiform maps also allow the display of multiple worlds, with opposing hemispheres – and Sharp argues that Donne's work references such a multiple world map in lines 11 to 18.

Julia M. Walker, writing in The Review of English Studies, notes that Sharp's work is "essential to an intelligent discussion of this extended image", but disagrees with his conclusions. In particular, she argues that Sharp's conclusions are incorrect, and that the actual words of the poem refer to a cordiform map showing a single world rather than one showing two worlds; "my face on thine eye", for example, not "eyes". Instead, Walker suggests that Donne was basing his work on William Cunningham's Cosmographical Glasse, a 1559 book which showed a single-leafed cordiform map. More importantly, it gave a way to draw a two-leafed, heart-shaped map that displayed only a single world; this interpretation would "reconcile and unify" the problems with interpreting "The Good-Morrow". The essential distinction is thus that, while both interpret Donne's work as referencing cordiform maps, Sharp sees it as referencing a map showing two worlds, while Walker maintains that the reference is to a map showing only one.

== Bibliography ==
- Bloom, Harold (1999). John Donne. Infobase Publishing. ISBN 978-0-7910-5116-0.
- Carey, John (2008). John Donne: Life, Mind and Art. Faber and Faber. ISBN 978-0-571-24446-1.
- Donne, John (1912). Grierson, Herbert J. C. (ed.). The Poems of John Donne. Vol. 1. London: Oxford University Press.
- Herz, Judith Scherer (2006). "Rereading Donne's poetry". In Achsah Guibbory (ed.). The Cambridge Companion to John Donne. Cambridge University Press. ISBN 978-0-521-54003-2.
- Guibbory, Achsah (2006). "Erotic Poetry". In Achsah Guibbory (ed.). The Cambridge Companion to John Donne. Cambridge University Press. ISBN 978-0-521-54003-2.
- Pebworth, Ted-Larry (2006). "The Text of Donne's Writing". In Achsah Guibbory (ed.). The Cambridge Companion to John Donne. Cambridge University Press. ISBN 978-0-521-54003-2.
- Satterthwaite, Alfred W. (1976). "Donne's The Good Morrow". The Explicator. 34 (7). Taylor & Francis. ISSN 0014-4940.
- Sharp, Robert L. (1954). "Donne's "Good Morrow" and Cordiform maps". Modern Language Notes. 69 (7). Johns Hopkins University Press. ISSN 0026-7910.
- Stubbs, John (2007). Donne: The Reformed Soul. Penguin Books. ISBN 978-0-14-101717-4.
- Walker, Julia M. (1986). "The Visual Paradigm of "The Good-Morrow"; Donne's Cosmographical Glasse". The Review of English Studies. 37 (145). Oxford University Press. ISSN 0034-6551.
