= Al-Rajib =

Town in Greater Amman area with Cave of the Seven Sleepers

Al-Rajib الرجيب
- Location in Jordan
- Coordinates: 31°54′N 35°59′E
- Country: Jordan
- Governorate: Amman Governorate
- Time zone: UTC + 2

Al-Rajib or simply Rajib is a town in Qweismeh area of Greater Amman Municipality in northwest Jordan. It's known for the Cave of the Seven Sleepers being located there.

== Archaeology ==
=== Rock-cut tombs ===
Excavations at Rajeb exposed three rock-cut family tombs on the southern slope of a hill east of the so-called Cave of the Seven Sleepers. Each tomb has a central chamber with surrounding burial niches and, in one case, a rock-cut pit that may have held reburied remains. Benches, sarcophagus spaces and blocked doorways show the tombs were carefully planned and reused by a local group over time.

The associated finds include several types of lamps (among them Herodian lamps), pottery vessels, glass, bronze ornaments, coins (among them issues of Philip the Arab) and other small metal pieces. Based mainly on pottery and coins, the use of these tombs is placed between the 1st and 3rd centuries AD, with at least two main phases in one of them.
