= Ashabi-Kahf in Nakhchivan =

Cave in Azerbaijan

Coordinates: 39.2202°N 45.5891°E

Ashabi-Kahf is a sanctuary in a natural cave which is located in the eastern part of the city of Nakhchivan, in the Nakhchivan Autonomous Republic of Azerbaijan. Since ancient times, Ashabi-Kahf has been revered as a sacred site, deeply embedded in the spiritual and cultural heritage of the region. Its significance extends far beyond the borders of the Republic, resonating across Azerbaijan and throughout the Middle East. Every year, tens of thousands of pilgrims journey to this hallowed place, drawn by its profound historical and religious importance.

== In the Qur’an ==
The meaning of Ashabi-Kahf in Arabic is “the cave possessers”. Ashabi-Kahf was mentioned in chapter 18 of Islam's holy book, the Qur'an. The surah is a parable about a group of young believers who had stood against those who trusted in others, besides God and hid themselves inside a cave in order to escape a persecution. The Qur'an says that number of young believers and the length of their stay is known only to God. It also emphasized that it is not the important part of the story, but rather the lessons learned from it. The event described in holy Qur'an can also be seen in legends about Ashabi-Kahf in.

== Structure ==
The cave's natural structure and its geographical location made it an ideal site for settlement and shelter for ancient peoples in Azerbaijan. A spring once flowed at the cave's entrance, though it eventually dried up. Restoration and construction work at "Ashabi-Kahf" was completed in 1998, following directives from Heydar Aliyev, 3rd President of Azerbaijan. A mosque was constructed, a road was built, and all necessary measures were taken to ensure comfortable and suitable conditions for pilgrims.
