= Eshab-ı Kehf Kulliye =

Historical building complex associated with Seven Sleepers; near Afşin, Turkey

Coordinates: 38°14′54″N 36°51′19″E

Eshab-ı Kehf Kulliye is a historical building complex in Kahramanmaraş Province, Turkey.

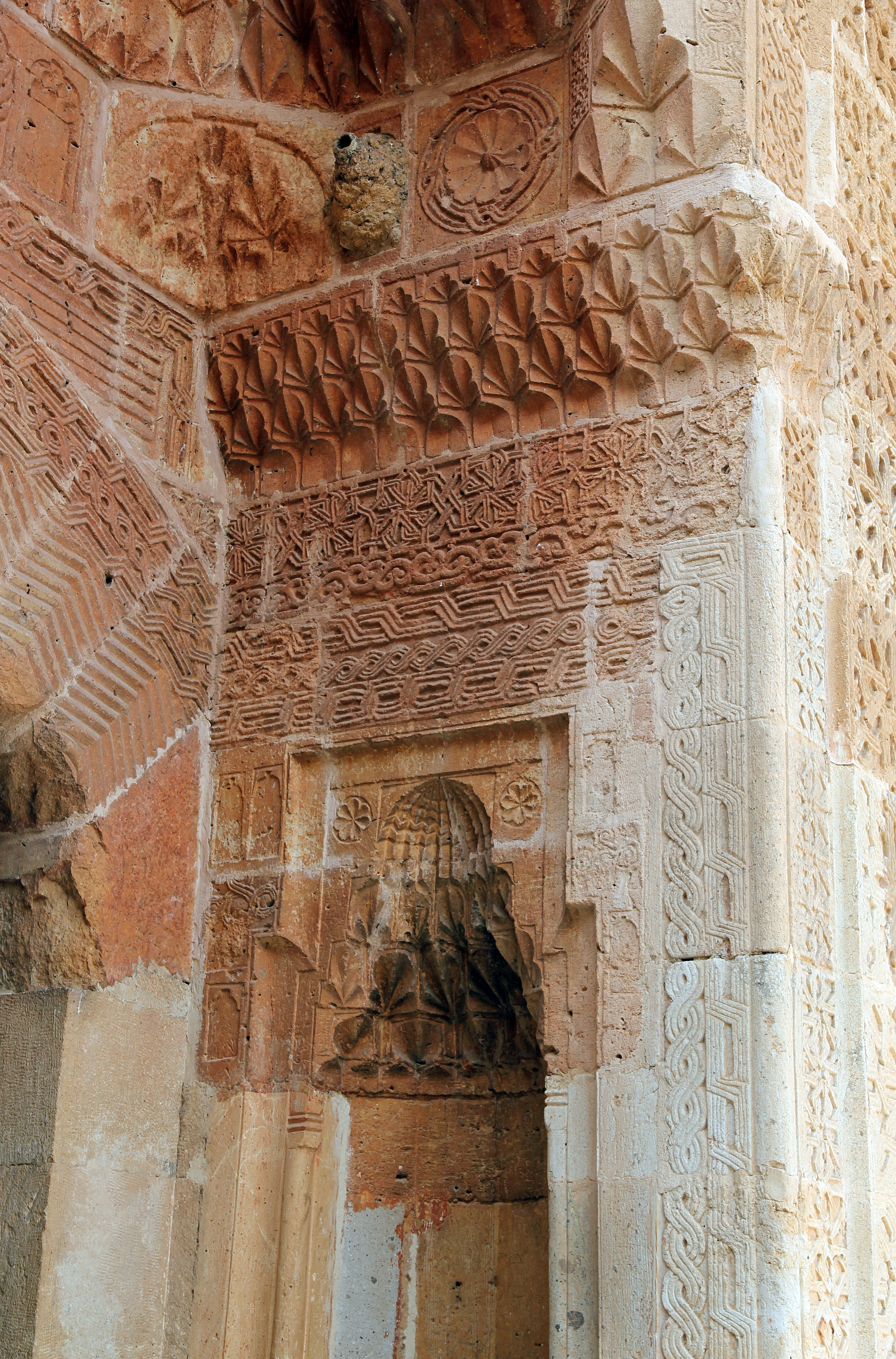
Eshab-ı Kehf Külliyesi

== Geography ==
The complex is next to a cave in on a hill named Bencilus 7 kilometres (4.3 mi) to Afşin ilçe (district) of Kahramanmaraş Province. Its distance to Kahramanmaraş is 130 kilometres (81 mi).

== History ==
The complex is composed of various buildings built in different eras. The church was built by the Byzantine emperor Theodosius II in 446. During the Sultanate of Rum, the Seljuk governor Nasretüddin built a mosque, a caravanserai and a fortified barracks between 1215 and 1233. Later, under the Beylik of Dulkadir, a madrasa (religious school) was added in 1480-1492 to the complex by Bozkurt of Dulkadir (also known as "Alaüddevle"). In 1500, Bozkurt's wife, Şemsi Hatun, commissioned a women's mosque. A pergola for the governor known as Paşa çardağı was the addition during the Suleiman the Magnificent's reign of the Ottoman Empire.

== Seven Sleepers legend ==
The külliye is known as the cave of the Seven Sleepers, where a legendary people lived in the 5th century. It is one of the many places which are allegedly the cave of the Seven Sleepers. An emperor who was influenced by their story had the church built for them. Later additions are also imposing. For example, the geometric ornaments on the gate which was built during the Seljuks cast shadows of a praying man, a praying woman and a dervish in during salah times.

== World Heritage Status ==
This site was added to the UNESCO World Heritage Tentative List on April 13, 2015 in the Cultural category.

== External source ==
- Afşin municipality page (Images and multi-language summary)
