= Al-Kahf =

18th chapter of the Qur'an

Surah 18 of the Quran
الكهف Al-Kahf The Cave
- Qira'ah; English text
- Classification: Meccan
- Position: Juzʼ 15 to 16
- Hizb no.: 30, 31
- No. of verses: 110
- No. of Rukus: 12
- No. of words: 1583
- No. of letters: 6425

Al-Kahf
Recitation of Al-Kahf in mujawwad.

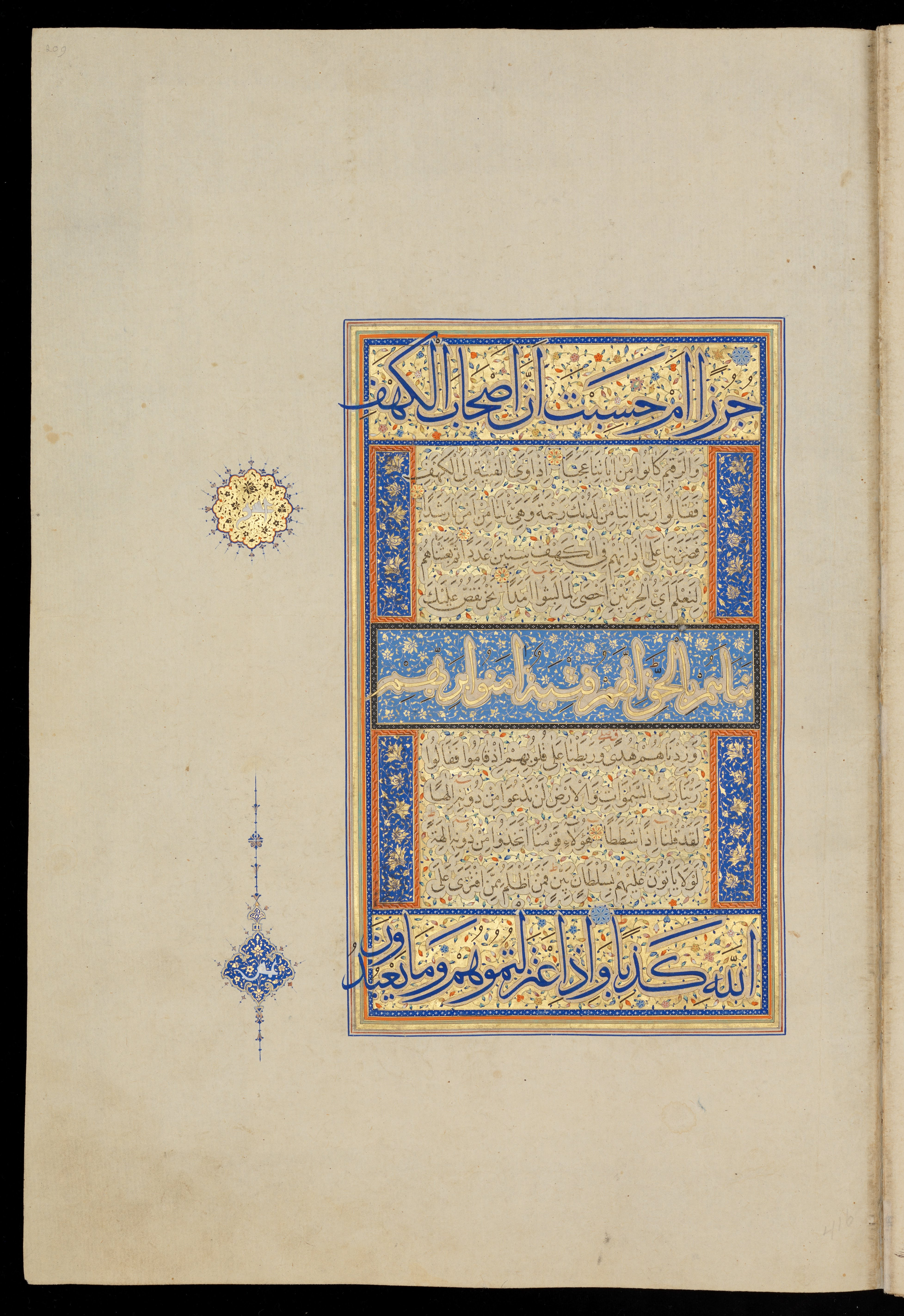
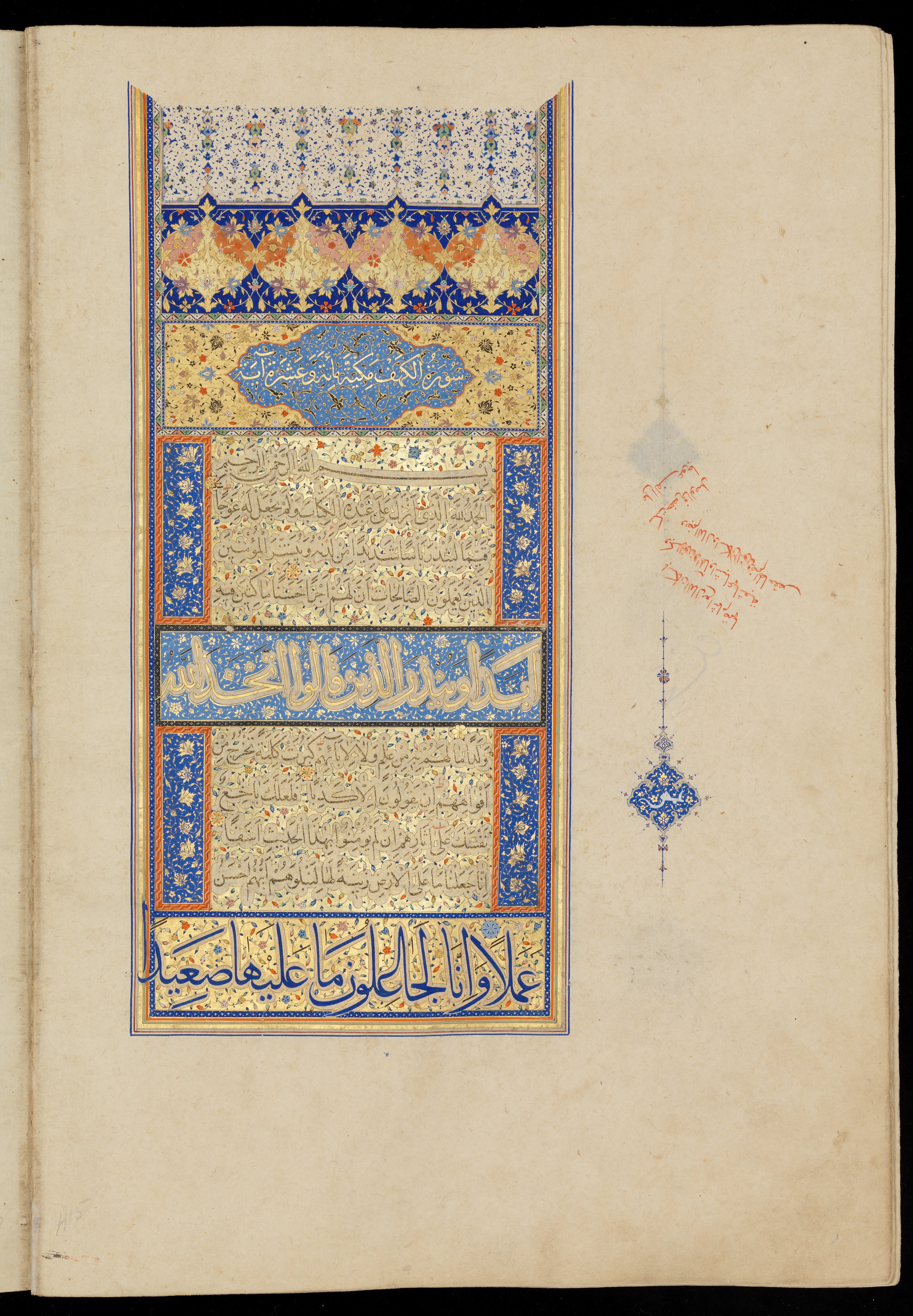
Heading for Surah Al-Kahf. From the Qur'an copied by Ruzbihan Muhammad al-Shirazi. Shiraz, c. 1550. Chester Beatty Library.

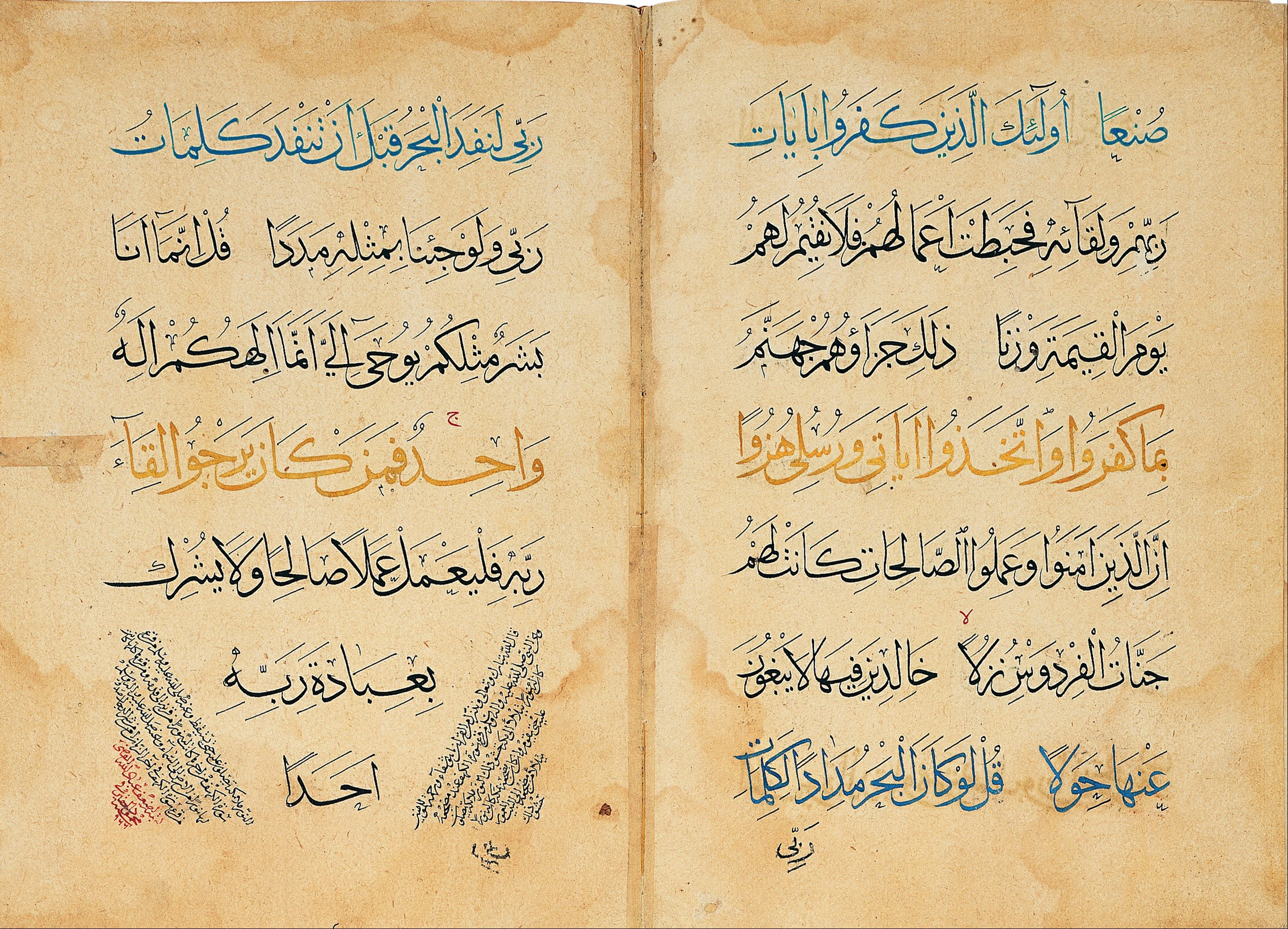
Surah Al-Kahf copied by Ottoman calligrapher Kadı Mahmud Efendi (d. 1575). Muhaqqaq, thuluth and reqa script. Sakıp Sabancı Museum

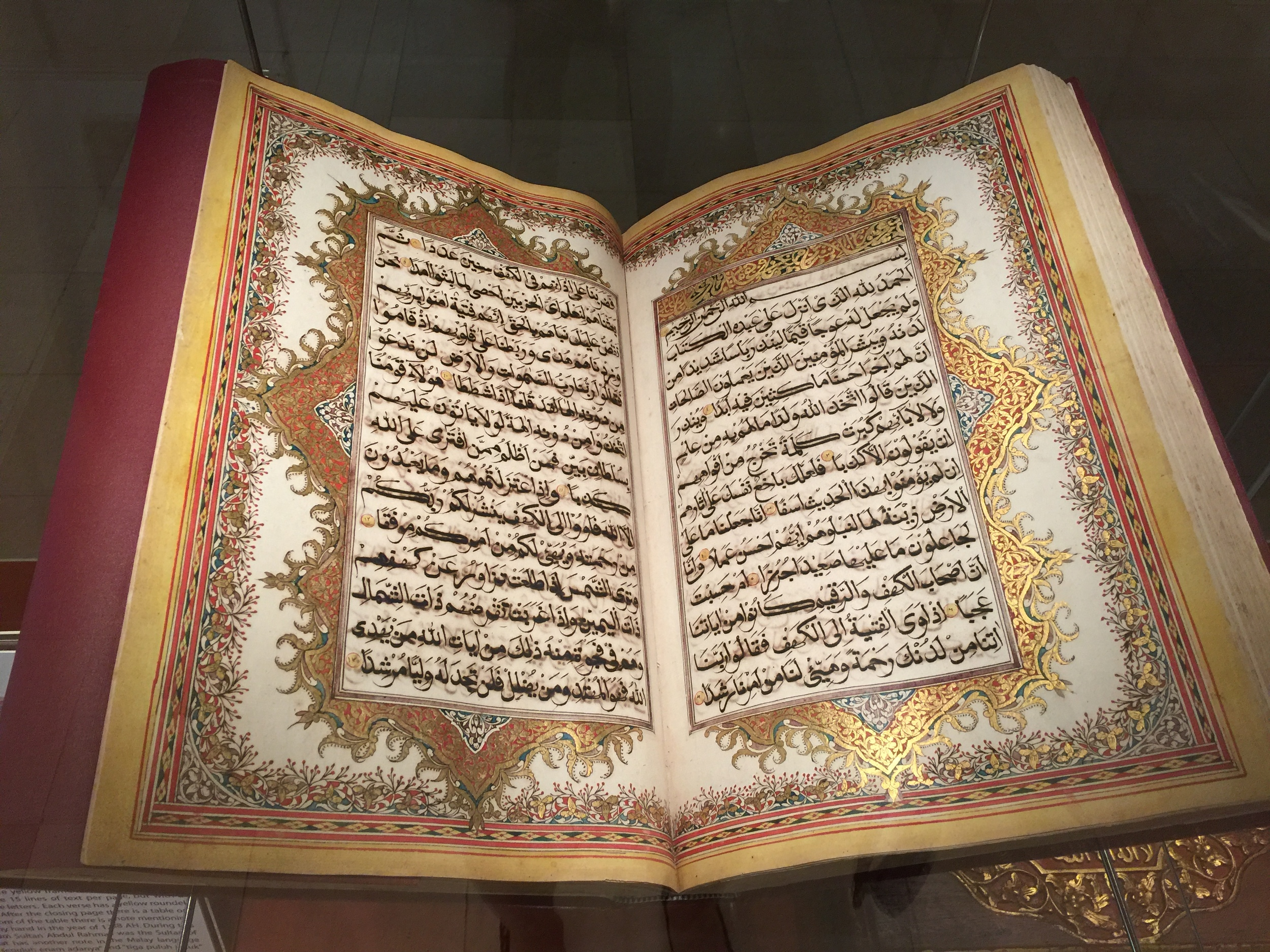
Central illumination of the Royal Terengganu Quran dated 1871. According to Malay tradition Al-Kahf verse 19 is accepted as the centre word of the Quran and Malay Qurans are often decorated in this place. Islamic Arts Museum Malaysia

Al-Kahf (Arabic: الكهف, lit. 'the Cave') is the 18th chapter (sūrah) of the Quran with 110 verses (āyāt). Regarding the timing and contextual background of the revelation (asbāb al-nuzūl), it is an earlier Meccan surah, which means it was revealed before Muhammad's hijrah to Medina instead of after. It is the chapter that contains the middle word of the entire Qur'an: وَلْيَتَلَطَّفْ walyatalaṭṭaf, meaning "let him be kind." The story of believers falling asleep in a cave for a long time is present also in the Christian tradition (Seven Sleepers).

== Summary ==
- 1 God praised for the gift of Quran
- 2 The Quran being a warning for the unbelievers and good tidings to the faithful
- 3 The reward for the believers who do good deeds will be an everlasting abode (Jannah)
- 4-5 The Quran is a warning to those who say God has begotten, and the ignorance of their sayings
- 6 Muhammad's grief for the disbelief of his people
- 7-8 Earth's adornment to be reduced to dust
- 9-22 The story of the companions of the cave
- 23-24 Muhammad is warned by God not to intend to do anything without saying "Insha-Allah" (Arabic: إن شاء الله, lit. 'if God wills').
- 25 The sleepers of the cave slept for 300 years and 9 more
- 26 Times and seasons are in God's hands. Time is a creation of God and can be modified by Him.
- 27 None can change the Quran
- 28 The pious are the Prophet's guardians
- 29 Truth is from the Lord
- 30-31 Sufferings of the wicked contrasted with the rewards of the righteous
- 32-44 The parable of the two men
- 45 Life on earth likened to water from heaven
- 46 God's preference to humans' good deeds than their wealth and children
- 47 Mankind's assemblage on the Judgement Day
- 48-49 The manner of the judgment—the book of personal action delivered
- 50 Iblis's refusal to prostrate to Adam when Adam was created
- 51 The offspring of Satan, not present at the creation
- 52 Idol-worshippers deserted by their idols during the Day of Judgment
- 53 The wicked doomed to hellfire
- 54 Every similitude mentioned in the Quran
- 55 Men's rejection of the Quran through their disbelief
- 56 Prophets have been sent with threats and good news
- 57 The sin of apostasy
- 58 God's mercy and that He appointed a time for people's accountability and torment
- 59 Disbelief's destruction of former cities
- 60-65 Moses and Joshua visit Khidr
- 66 Moses desires to be taught by Khidr
- 66-69 Khidr, knowing Moses's inability to receive his wisdom, yields to his importunity
- 71-77 He scuttles a boat, kills a boy, and rebuilds a collapsing wall
- 78-82 Khidr refuses to communicate further with Moses on account of his protests against his conduct, but condescends to explain his conduct.
- 83-86 Dhu'l-Qarnayn journeys to the setting sun which appears to him to be setting in a muddy pool
- 87-88 He finds a people, whom he is permitted to treat as he wills
- 89-90 The phenomenon of Midnight Sun
- 91-94 He travels east and north, where he finds an ignorant race, who plead his protection against Gog and Magog
- 95-97 He builds a rampart against them
- 98 Gog and Magog to be let loose before Judgement Day
- 99 All creatures being resurrected and gathered by the trumpet blow of Israfil. (Note: According to Islamic belief in weak chain of Hadith, Israfil were acknowledged as angel who were tasked to blower of Armageddon trumpet. Israfil also mentioned by Suyuti as Muezzin among angels and a member of a group of biggest archangels who bear the Throne of God on their back. However, Abu Bakar al-Hudhali opined the angel who blowing horn were different from Israfil, while Abu Said Al-Khudri nentioned the blower of horn were in fact consisted of two angels, while he supported the opinion that Israfil were also one of the blower.)
- 100-108 The rewards and punishments of Judgement Day
- 109 The ocean's insufficiency to write all the words of God with ink
- 110 Muhammad's morality and humanity

== Exegesis ==
=== 9-26 "Companions of the cave" ===
Verses 9–26 of the chapter retell the Christian folktale of the "companions of the cave". A few young believers lived in a time when they were tortured for their beliefs. Upon the guidance of God, they fled the city where believers were persecuted, together with their dog, and took refuge in a cave where they fell asleep. When they awoke they found that the people of the city had become believers.

=== 27 No room for explicit textual changes of the Quran ===
And recite (and teach) what has been revealed to thee of the Book of thy Lord: none can change His Words, and none wilt thou find as a refuge other than Him. Translation Yusuf Ali (Orig. 1938)

The commentary by Ozma Nasir Makarim Shirazi says, "There is no room for diversity to enter into His Words and Knowledge. His Speech and His Knowledge is not like the speech and knowledge of human beings which, as a result of a new invention or information, has to be changed". Ibn Kathir says this verse means of the words in the Quran, "no one can alter them, distort them or misinterpret them."

=== 32-45 The parable of the two men ===
In verses 32–44, the surah discusses a parable of two men, one of whom had been given blessings from God and the other poor. The rich one wronged his soul and started showing off with his wealth and noble lineage.

And he had fruit, so he said to his companion while he was conversing with him, "I am greater than you in wealth and mightier in [numbers of] men."

— Quran, Al-Kahf (The Cave), Ayah 34

Verse 36 explains that the rich man also told his companion that he doubted the existence of Judgment Day. At the end of the parable, God destroys what He had given the man.

Q18:45 Imam Musa al-Kadhim narrates in Kitab al-Kafi that Ali would bequeath his companions to view this world with the vision of an ascetic because it dislodges its residents. Ali provides them with the parable of a lush, green garden with scented dew that accumulates under the blades of grass but then gets separated from it in the morning, as Allah has said,

"Set forth to them the similitude of the life of this world: it is like the rain which We send down from the skies: the earth's vegetation absorbs it, But soon it becomes dry stubble, which the winds do scatter: it is (only) Allah Who prevails over all things. Q18:45." He advises his companions to "look at this world and the numerous things which cause you to wonder, and the scarcity of things that benefit you."

=== 60-82 Islamic view of Moses ===
The third main story within the chapter (verses 60–82) is that of Musa (Moses) traveling to gain knowledge from another servant of God who is never mentioned by name, in tafsir of ibn Kathir he is called Al-Khidr.

=== 83-98 Dhu'l-Qarnayn and the Sun setting in a marsh ===
Finally, the surah mentions in verses 83–98 a man who traveled a great deal and reached the east and the west of the earth – namely, Dhu'l-Qarnayn (Arabic: ذو القرنين, lit. 'the one with two horns'). According to most historians, the story of Dhu al-Qarnayn has its origins in legends of Alexander the Great current in the Middle East, namely the Syriac Alexander Legend. From this derives the Quranic presentation of Dhu al-Qarnayn as a prophet-king who travels the world and calls for belief.

The story reflects the flat earth cosmology of the Quran. Gabriel Said Reynolds of the University of Notre Dame writes:

The “confluence of the two seas” (majmaʿ al-baḥrayn) in verse 60 is generally understood by Muslim commentators to be, as Tafsīr al-Jalālayn explains, “the point where the Byzantine sea and the Persian sea meet.” However, in light of this episode’s relationship to the Alexander literature, this phrase more likely means the point at which the waters in the heavens and the waters on earth meet (on this see Gen 1:6–7), that is, the end of the world (n.b. in this regard how Alexander, or Dhū l-Qarnayn, goes to the westernmost [v. 86] and easternmost [v.90] points on earth, something which reflects a flat earth.). As Tommaso Tesei (QSC, 381–82) has shown, Syriac Christian authors such as Narsai (Homélies de Narsaï sur la création, p. 528), use the expression “two seas” to refer to the waters of heaven and the waters of earth. The Qurʾān also refers to “two seas” in 25:53 and 55:19.

— Gabriel Said Reynolds, The Qur'an and the Bible: Text and Commentary

In one part of the story, Dhu'l-Qarnayn helps a tribe of people build a massive wall of iron between two mountains to protect them from the nations of Gog and Magog. It goes on to say that this wall will be only destroyed near the end times. The wall may have reflected a distant knowledge of the Great Wall of China (the 12th-century scholar al-Idrisi drew a map for Roger II of Sicily showing the "Land of Gog and Magog" in Mongolia), or of various Sassanid Persian walls built in the Caspian area against the northern barbarians, or a conflation of the two.

Critics such as Richard Dawkins have criticised the claim that the Sun sets in a marsh, referring to Verse 86 of the Quran:

...until he [Dhul Qarnain] reached the setting ˹point˺ of the sun, which appeared to him to be setting in a spring of murky water...

— Dr. Mustafa Khattab, The Clear Quran

== Traditional revelational circumstances ==
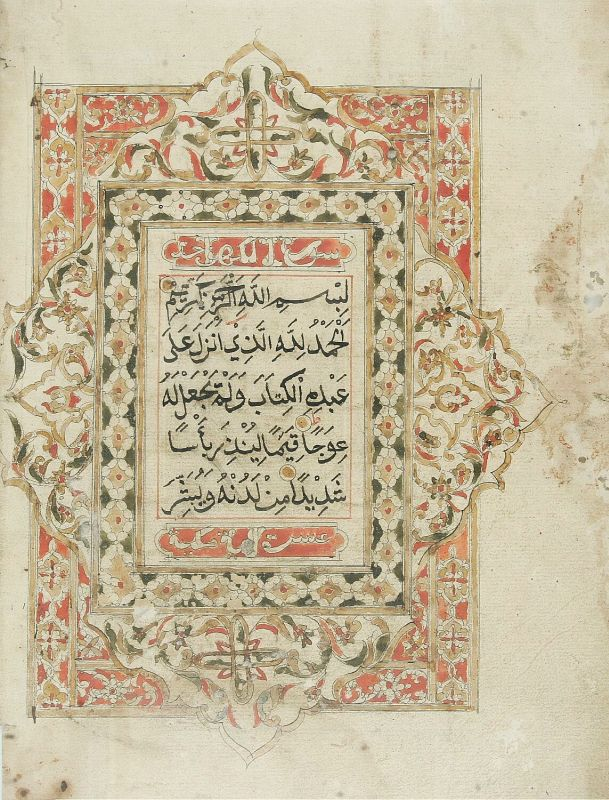
Sura Al-Kahf in a Qur'an manuscript from Aceh

Arab Muslim historian and hagiographer, Ibn Ishaq, reported in his traditional book (oral traditions) of biography of Muhammad, Sirat Rasul Allah that the 18th surah of the Quran (which includes the story of Dhu'l-Qarnayn) was revealed to the Islamic prophet Muhammad by God on account of some questions posed by rabbis residing in the city of Medina – the verse was revealed during the Meccan period of Muhammad's life. According to Ibn Ishaq, Muhammad's tribe, the powerful Quraysh, were greatly concerned about their tribesman who had started claiming prophethood and wished to consult rabbis about the matter. The Quraysh sent two men to the rabbis of Medina, reasoning that they had superior knowledge of the scriptures and about the prophets of God. The two Quraysh men described their tribesman, Muhammad, to the rabbis.

The rabbis told the men to ask Muhammad three questions:

They [the rabbis] said, "Ask him about three things which we will tell you to ask, and if he answers them then he is a Prophet who has been sent; if he does not, then he is saying things that are not true, in which case how you will deal with him will be up to you. Ask him about some young men in ancient times, what was their story for theirs is a strange and wondrous tale. Ask him about a man who traveled a great deal and reached the east and the west of the earth. What was his story and ask him about the Ruh (Holy spirit) – what is it? If he tells you about these things, then he is a Prophet, so follow him, but if he does not tell you, then he is a man who is making things up, so deal with him as you see fit."

According to Ibn Ishaq, when Muhammad was informed of the three questions from the rabbis, he said that he would have the answers in the morning but did not say "if God wills it". For fifteen days, Muhammad waited eagerly for the revelation. Muhammad did not answer the question until then. Doubt in Muhammad began to grow amongst the people of Mecca. Then, after fifteen days, Muhammad received the revelation of al-Kahf as an answer to the questions.

== Virtues ==
There is a hadith in Sahih Muslim that states that Muhammad said (Concerning The False Messiah, Al-Masih ad-Dajjal):

"He who amongst you would survive to see him should recite over him the opening verses of Sura Kahf"

— Sahih Muslim, Book 41, Number 7015

Another Hadith in Sahih Muslim states:

"If anyone learns by heart the first ten verses of Surah Al-Kahf, he will be protected from the Dajjal"

— Sahih Muslim, Book 6, Number 311

- "Whoever reads Sura Kahf on Friday, light shall shine forth for him between the two Fridays."

== Pop culture ==
The Men of Angelos, also known as The Companions of the Cave, is a 1997 famous Iranian television series directed by Farajollah Salahshoor. It depicts the story of the Seven Sleepers, according to the Quran.

== See also ==
- Ashabi-Kahf in Nakhchivan a sanctuary in a natural cave
