= Geology of Loch Lomond and The Trossachs National Park =

The geology of Loch Lomond and The Trossachs National Park in the southwestern part of the Scottish Highlands consists largely of Neoproterozoic (late Precambrian) and Palaeozoic bedrock faulted and folded and subjected to low grade metamorphism during the Caledonian orogeny. These older rocks, assigned to the Dalradian Supergroup, lie to the northwest of the northeast – southwest aligned Highland Boundary Fault which defines the southern edge of the Highlands. A part of this mountainous park extends south of this major geological divide into an area characterised by younger Devonian rocks which are assigned to the Old Red Sandstone.

A variety of igneous rocks intrude the Dalradian sequence, including dykes, sills and plutons. Along the Highland Boundary Fault is a zone of metamorphosed rocks grouped as the Highland Border Complex and dated to the Cambrian and Ordovician periods. There are outliers of Carboniferous age rocks to the east and west of Loch Lomond.

Landforms reflect the significant impact of glaciation on the area during the last and previous ice ages.

== Dalradian rocks ==
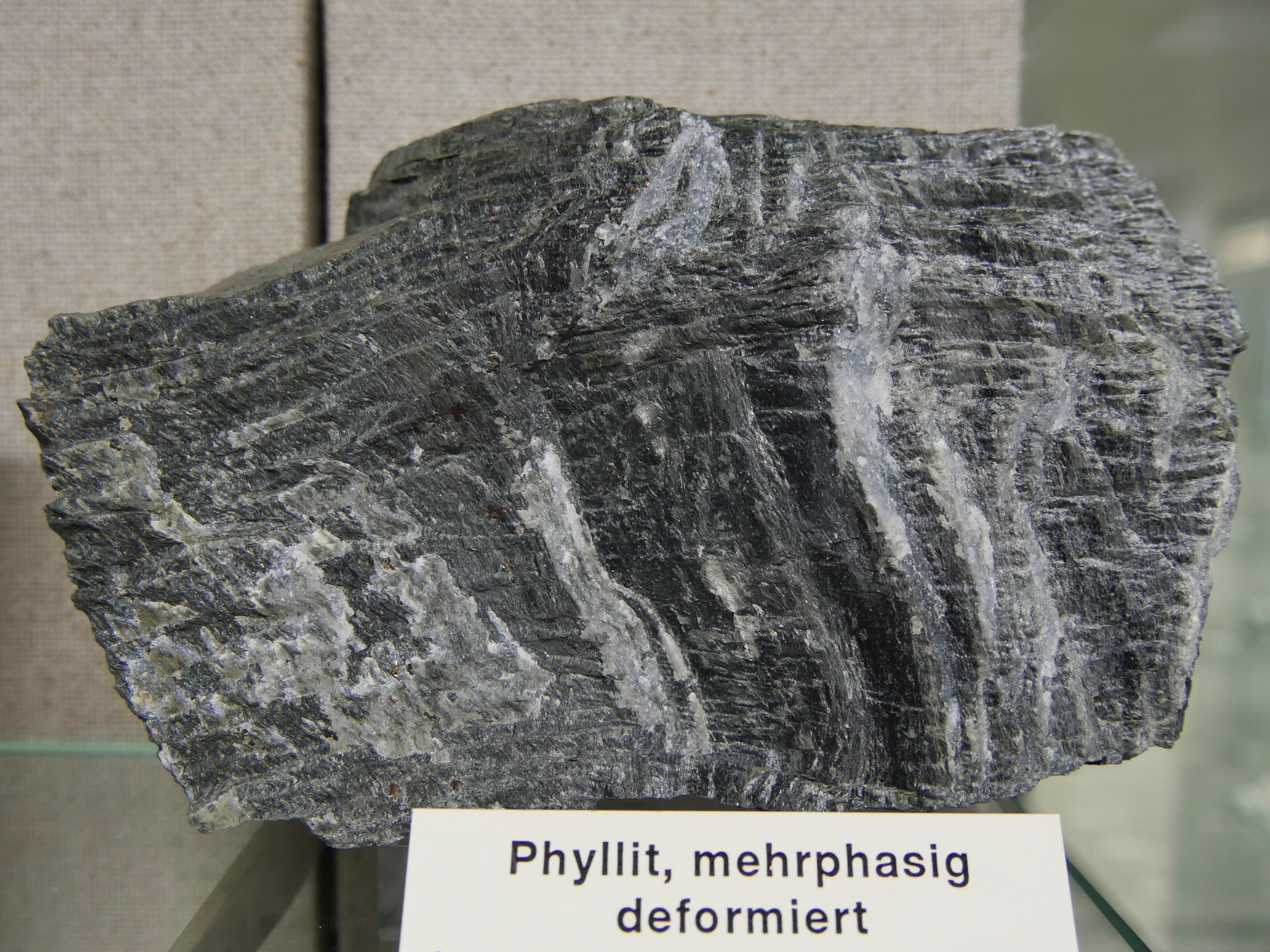
Dalradian phyllite from Inverbeg

The Dalradian sequence originates in the Neoproterozoic and early Palaeozoic between about 1000 and 500 million years ago. Within this area, three stratigraphic groups are present; the Appin, Argyll and Southern Highland groups. Rocks of the Southern Highland Group account for the larger part of the area whilst those of the older Argyll Group dominate along the northern margin of the park. The oldest rocks within the park are those in a small area on its margins to the north and west of Tyndrum and assigned to the Appin Group. Each group comprises psammites and pelites (sandstones and mudstones which have been subjected to low grade metamorphism). Lavas, tuffs and volcaniclastics also occur through the Southern Highland Group whilst meta-limestone and quartzites are to be found within the Argyll Group.

The Southern Highland Group consists of the Pitlochry Schist Formation overlain by the Loch Katrine Volcanic (or Volcaniclastic) Formation which is in turn overlain by the Ben Ledi Grit Formation. Ben Lomond, Ben Venue and Ben Ledi are all formed from the Ben Ledi grit. Ben Vorlich, Ben Ime and Ben Arthur are all formed from the Beinn Bheula Schist.

== Late Palaeozoic rocks ==
A cover of relatively flat-lying (post-orogenic) sedimentary rocks of Devonian and Carboniferous age lie unconformably across the basement rocks at and south of the Highland border.

=== Old Red Sandstone ===
Along the southeastern border of the national park, southeast of the Highland Boundary Fault is a broad outcrop of Devonian age rocks, familiarly referred to as the Old Red Sandstone, part of a much wider outcrop which extends from the Firth of Clyde to the North Sea coast. This thick sequence of sandstones, siltstones, mudstones and conglomerates is divided into three units; the Lower Old Red Sandstone is represented by rocks assigned to the Arbuthnott-Garvock and Strathmore groups. They are in turn made up of a variety of individual formations characterized by sandstones and to a lesser extent conglomerates and with some siltstones and mudstones too.

Unconformably overlying these (though the boundary is also faulted) are Upper Devonian rocks labelled the Stockiemuir Sandstone Formation which is assigned to the Stratheden Group.

=== Carboniferous rocks ===
The Inverclyde Group is present in a couple of outliers immediately north of the Highland Boundary Fault to the east and west of Loch Lomond. The eastern outlier forms the ground just to the north of Conic Hill and is assigned to the Kinnesswood Formation which consists of sandstones, often conglomeratic at their base, together with mudstones and cornstones (nodular carbonates).

The Ballagan Formation which includes mudstones and siltstones within which are thin beds (or sometimes just nodules) of ferroan dolomite, traditionally referred to as ‘cementstones’, is represented by a very small inlier on the park's southwestern boundary.

== Mineralisation ==
Mineral-rich fluids percolated through the Dalradian rocks in the Tyndrum and Cononish areas depositing lead, iron and copper sulphides in mineral veins. Gold and silver occur also with exploitation of the former in consideration at Cononish.

== Quaternary ==
In common with the rest of Scotland, the landscapes of the National Park have been subjected to repeated glaciations during the last 2.5 million years. After the end of the last ice age, there was a brief return to full glacial conditions between 12,700 and 11,500 years ago; a phase known throughout Britain as the Loch Lomond Stadial. An ice cap was re-established over the West Highlands and glaciers moved down the major valleys within the national park. These included the Lomond Glacier, Dochart Glacier and the Menteith Glacier.

== Geoconservation ==
A number of Geological Conservation Review sites have been identified within the national park, about half of which have been designated as sites of special scientific interest (SSSIs). The Falls of Dochart, the delta of the River Balvag (Loch Lubnaig Marshes) and the River Endrick have all been notified as SSSIs for their fluvial geomorphology whilst mass movement sites at Ben Vane, Glen Ample and Beinn Arthur (The Cobbler) have been declared GCR sites but not notified as SSSIs. Other Quaternary sites include Croftamie, Portnellan-Ross Priory-Claddochside and the Menteith moraine which is partly within Flanders Moss SSSI. Igneous GCRs include Balmaha & Arrochymore Point (as Conic Hill SSSI) and Garabal Hill. Tyndrum Main Mine and Crom Allt have been designated for their mineralogy, the latter is also an SSSI.
