= Geology of the Cairngorms National Park =

This article describes the geology of the Cairngorms National Park, an area in the Highlands of Scotland designated as a national park in 2003 and extended in 2010. The Cairngorms National Park extends across a much wider area than the Cairngorms massif itself and hence displays rather more varied geology.

The majority of the rocks within the National Park belong to the Dalradian Supergroup, a thick sequence of sands, muds and limestones that were deposited between about 800 and 600 million years ago on the margins of the former continent of Laurentia. Rocks now ascribed to the Loch Ness Supergroup occur along the northwestern edge of the Park.

The Dalradian and Loch Ness successions were intensely faulted, folded and metamorphosed during the Caledonian Orogeny between about 490 and 430 million years ago Geologists recognize a ‘Grampian event’, centred around 470 million years ago, which was responsible for the initial deformation of the Dalradian and relates to the collision of a volcanic island arc with Laurentia over a period of about 20 million years. The subsequent collision of Baltica with Laurentia caused the ‘Scandian event’ which involved further folding and faulting of the Dalradian rock sequence. The Great Glen, Ericht-Laidon and Glen Tilt faults were all active as strike-slip faults at this time and may have played a part in allowing large plutons of granite to rise up amongst the Dalradian rocks and then cool in situ.

The largest of these plutons is the granite mass which forms the Cairngorms themselves and which was emplaced around 427 million years ago. It is thought that the pluton had been unroofed within 20 million years of its emplacement and that the present landscape of the Cairngorms had begun to form by 390 million years ago. Evidence suggests that the granite currently at the surface was initially to be found at a depth of between 4 and 7 km.

Other than a small outlier of Old Red Sandstone, there are no younger solid rocks within the National Park. The ice ages of the last 2.5 million years have however left their mark both in terms of erosional and depositional features. Post-glacial features include peat and landslips.

== Loch Ness Supergroup ==
The metamorphic rocks of the Loch Ness Supergroup are mostly identified with the Northwest Highlands west of the Great Glen Fault but there are some similar rocks east of the fault that have been correlated with that succession.

The Markie Gneiss is a unit of micaceous psammite within fault-bounded blocks on the western margin of the National Park. It is of Neoproterozoic age but its exact relationship to other strata continues to be debated.

=== Badenoch Group ===
The oldest rocks within the area are those of the Tonian age Badenoch Group, which occur along the northwestern edge of the national park. These rocks were formerly referred to as the Central Highland Division or Central Highland Migmatite Complex and have been included both within the Moine and Dalradian successions at various times. Estimates of age have varied but an age of around 900 million years is suggested by the British Geological Survey. They are largely psammites and semipelites which have been intensely deformed and which are generally heavily migmatised. The group is divided into a lower part, the Dava Subgroup (previously the ‘Dava Succession’ and named after the Dava district between Grantown-on-Spey and Inverness) and an upper part, the Glen Banchor Subgroup (named after Glen Banchor which extends west from Newtonmore). Though its lower (western) boundary is not seen, the whole sequence is believed to be several kilometres thick. The nature of its upper boundary with Grampian Group rocks in the east has been disputed. The latter may rest unconformably on the Glen Banchor rocks or else the relationship may be wholly tectonic in nature i.e. faulted or sheared. Within the groups are various named formations:

- Glen Banchor Subgroup
- Dava Subgroup
  - Slochd Psammite Formation
  - Flichity Semipelite
  - Beinn Bhreac Psammite
  - Creag Buidhe Semipelite

Badenoch Group rocks crop out northwest of a line running southwest from the Grantown Pluton towards the Boat of Garten and Monadhliath plutons. Within this area, a broad band of non-migmatised psammites extends beneath Carrbridge area and is well exposed further north at Creag an Righ, west of Grantown.

== Dalradian Supergroup ==
Besides intrusive igneous rocks, the rest of the National Park is almost exclusively formed in metamorphosed strata collectively known as the Dalradian Supergroup or simply the Dalradian. They are a complex mix of psammites, phyllites, pelites, semipelites, quartzites and meta-limestones and other lithologies originally laid down as marine sand, mud, silt etc. in a depositional basin which alternately deepened and was filled over an extended period of time. The total thickness of this sequence is estimated at 25 km or more though the full thickness is unlikely ever to have accumulated at any one location A variety of dates have been suggested for the age of the succession but sedimentation perhaps took place broadly between about 750 and 500 million years ago.

The Dalradian is divided into four groups which stretch across the Grampian Highlands from Argyll in the southwest to northeast Scotland. All four groups and their various constituent subgroups and formations are seen within the National Park. The broad stratigraphy of the Dalradian is (oldest at bottom of list, youngest at top):

- Southern Highland Group
- Argyll Group
  - Tayvallich Subgroup
  - Crinan Subgroup
  - Easdale Subgroup
  - Islay Subgroup
- Appin Group
  - Blair Atholl Subgroup
  - Ballachulish Subgroup
  - Lochaber Subgroup
- Grampian Group
  - Glen Spean Subgroup
  - Corrieyairack Subgroup
  - Glenshirra Subgroup

=== Grampian Group ===
The Grampian Group is the oldest division of the Dalradian and is recognized from Islay to Nairn and is also seen on the Atlantic coast of Ireland. It is itself divided into three parts; the Glenshirra, Corrieyairack and Glen Spean subgroups. The succession is considered to be 7–8 km thick and composed of psammites and semipelites and quartzites. The lowermost (i.e. oldest) strata within the group (overlying the rocks of the Badenoch Group) are meta-limestones and pelites, referred to at one time as the Ord Ban Subgroup but now referred to as the Grantown Formation and placed within the Glenshirra Subgroup. They may have originated as shallow marine shelf deposits. Overlying these are the rocks of the Corrieyairick Subgroup which are thought to have originally been turbidites and represent a time of rifting and basin development. The following formations are recognized within the subgroup: Creag Meagaidh Psammite, Ardair Semipelite, Elrick Psammite and Semipelite, Loch Laggan Psammite, Kincraig, Coire nan Laogh Semipelite and Ruthven Semipelite formations. The youngest Grampian Group rocks are those of the Glen Spean Subgroup, originally nearshore and tidal deposits laid down at a time when the depositional basin was gradually filling. Within this subgroup are the Grantown Formation, Feshiebridge Formation, Coylumbridge Formation and Pityoulish Formation. The following formations are recognised within the undivided Grampian Group: Tormore Psammite, Nethybridge Psammite, Knockando Quartzite, Pityoulish and Dallas Psammite formations.

=== Appin Group ===
Overlying the Grampian Group is the Appin Group which is divided into three subgroups, the oldest being the Lochaber and the youngest the Blair Atholl with the Ballachulish separating the two. It was formerly referred to as the Lower Dalradian or Lower Dalradian Group. The rocks of the Lochaber Subgroup, sometimes encountered in earlier references as the Lochaber (Transition) Subgroup Much of this succession represents tidal and shelf deposits as the basin gradually subsided and deepened. The subgroup includes the Tom na Fianaig, Fodderletter Calcareous Flag, Riabhach Banded and Dalvrecht Slate formations. The Ballachulish Subgroup was formerly referred to as the Ballachulish Group. It includes the Ailnack Phyllite and Limestone, Corryhabbie Quartzite and Mortlach Graphitic Schist formations. The youngest Appin rocks are those of the Blair Atholl Subgroup, previously referred to as the Blair Atholl Series. These were laid down during a period of basin filling. They include the Glenfiddich Pelite, Tornahaish Dark Schist and Limestone, Inchrory Limestone, Clashnoir Semipelite and Neilead Limestone formations.

=== Argyll Group ===
The Islay Subgroup is the oldest/lowermost division of the group and includes the Kymah Quartzite, Auchnahyle, Ladder Hills and Nochty Semipelite and Limestone formations. Overlying this is the Easdale Subgroup which includes the Badenyon Schist and Limestone, Reppachie Semipelitic Schist, Glenbuchat Graphitic Schist, Lynavoir Semipelite and Culchavie Striped formations. Within the overlying Crinan Subgroup is the Queens Hill Gneiss Formation (or Queen's Hill Formation). The youngest part of the Argyll Group is the Tayvallich Subgroup. It contains the Deeside Limestone Formation. Certain stratigraphic relationships within the Argyll Group are uncertain but the group also includes the Craigievar, Blackwater and Scors Burn Schist formations.

=== Southern Highland Group ===
The Southern Highland Group is the youngest part of the Dalradian and occurs in the southeast of the park around Glen Prosen and from Glen Clova east to Loch Lee in Glen Esk, Its wider extent stretches from Northern Ireland to the North Sea coast including southern Shetland. The larger part of Glen Clova is cut into rocks of the Southern Highland Group rocks whilst the neighbouring mountains of Mayar and Driesh are formed from these same rocks. It includes the Clashindarroch and Suie Hill formations.

== Old Red Sandstone ==
An outlier of the Lower Old Red Sandstone occurs around the Tomintoul area. Principally Devonian age sandstones, they contain siltstones too and a basal conglomerate. These strata are collected together as the Tomintoul Group and consist of a lower Delnabo Conglomerate Formation, an overlying Raebeg Sandstone Formation and an upper Conglass Sandstone Formation. The lower part of this sequence may be latest Silurian in age.

Theses rocks form hills such as Carn na Farraidh, Carn Meadhonach and Tom na Bal to the west and south of Tomintoul. No solid rocks of late Devonian or succeeding periods are recorded within the area of the National Park.

== Plutons ==
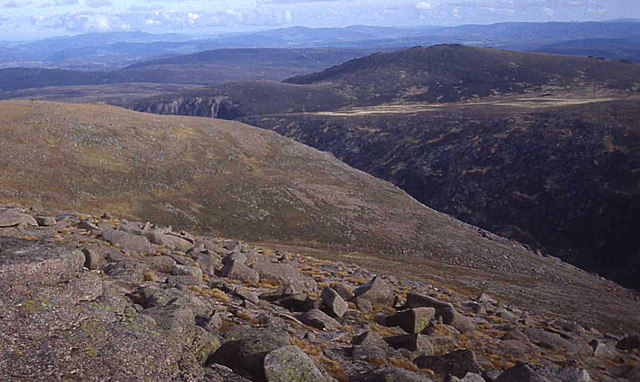
Cairngorm Pluton at Cairn Gorm and Bynack More

Numerous plutons were emplaced within the Dalradian sequence at the close of the Caledonian Orogeny from late Silurian to early Devonian times. These have been be divided into a ‘Cairngorm suite’, an ‘Argyll and Northern Highland suite’ and a ‘South of Scotland suite’ on the basis of different geochemical characteristics. There are also variations in lithology within individual plutons.

The largest pluton within the National Park (by area) and the one which has the most dramatic effect on the landscape is the centrally located Cairngorm pluton. It extends over an area of about 365 square kilometres and was emplaced around 427 million years ago. The Mount Battock pluton is of a similar size but only the western portion of it falls within the national park.

== Structure ==
The geological structures within the area are complex, being the product of multiple deformational events. Two late Proterozoic events were followed by a further event during the Ordovician and Silurian. Metamorphism was associated with some of the deformational events.

The Ericht-Laidon Fault is a major northeast–southwest aligned structure passing through the west of the Park. Though little exposed at the surface, it has been mapped passing beneath Grantown-on-Spey and, outside the Park's southwestern border, running the length of both Loch Ericht and Loch Laidon from which it takes its name. The similarly aligned Loch Tay Fault is a major landscape-forming feature running through the centre of the Park. It is mapped along the length of the notably straight Glen Tilt, passing out of the Park immediately west of Blair Atholl, en route for the Highland border via the central alignment of the loch which gives it its name. It also runs through Clais Fhearnaig, a glacial meltwater channel which connects Glen Lui and Glen Quoich. It defines the eastern margin of the Cairngorm pluton before running into Glen Builg at its northeastern end. The Bridge of Garry-Loch Balgie Fault is a third member of this group entering the Park from the southwest in the vicinity of Dalnaspidal Lodge. They are considered to be members of a family of faults with associated movement histories which includes the Great Glen Fault with which they run in parallel.

The Grampian Shear Zone, otherwise referred to as the Grampian Slide Zone juxtaposes rocks of the Badenoch Group against those of the Grampian Group. It has been dated to around 750 million years ago.

== Quaternary ==
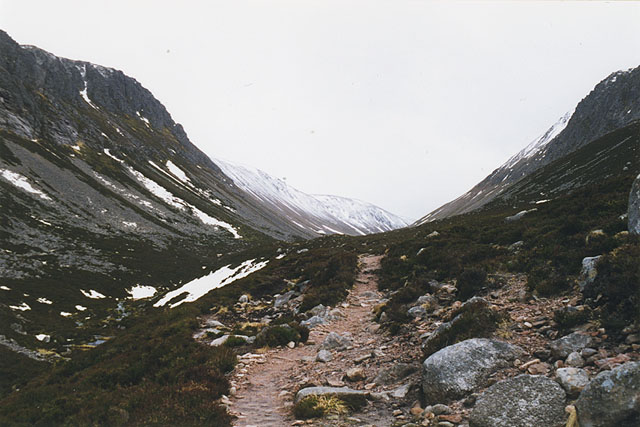
The Lairig Ghru, a glaciated U-shaped valley

Within Britain, the Cairngorm landscape is considered to be of the very highest importance for its glacial geomorphology. It displays a large number and wide range of features associated with glaciation and periglaciation including corries and glacial troughs, moraines, kames, eskers and other depositional features, pro-talus ramparts, meltwater channels. Corrie lakes of glacial origin occur at Loch nan Eun and Lochnagar beneath the mountain of Lochnagar, Loch Brandy and Loch Wharral above Glen Clova, Lochan nan Gabhar beneath Ben Avon and Dubh Lochan beneath Beinn a Bhuird. There are several Lochan Uaine's within the central Cairngorms alongside Loch Etchachan and Loch Coire an Lochain. Loch Kander is another with a glacial origin near the head of Glen Callater. On the eastern margins of the Monadhliath are Lochan a Choire beneath Geal Charn and Loch Dubh. Besides corries, nivation hollows are present such as that at Ciste Mhearaid. Amongst the most significant glacial troughs are those of Loch Avon, Glen Einich, the Lairig Ghru and Strath Nethy within the Cairngorm massif and those of Loch Muick and Glen Clova in the wider Park. Meltwater channels are common, notable examples being those at Chalamain Gap and Eag a’ Chait east of the Lairig Ghru, the Ryvoan Pass east of Glenmore and Clais Fhearnaig between Glen Lui and Glen Quoich. Numerous kettle holes, which originated as sizeable blocks of ice melted amongst glacial sediment, occur within Strathspey, many of which contain lochans such as that at Loch Vaa near Aviemore.

The various deposits associated with the Devensian (last) ice age are collectively known as the Caledonia Glacigenic Group and include the Central Grampian and East Grampian Glacigenic subgroups in this area.

=== Tors ===
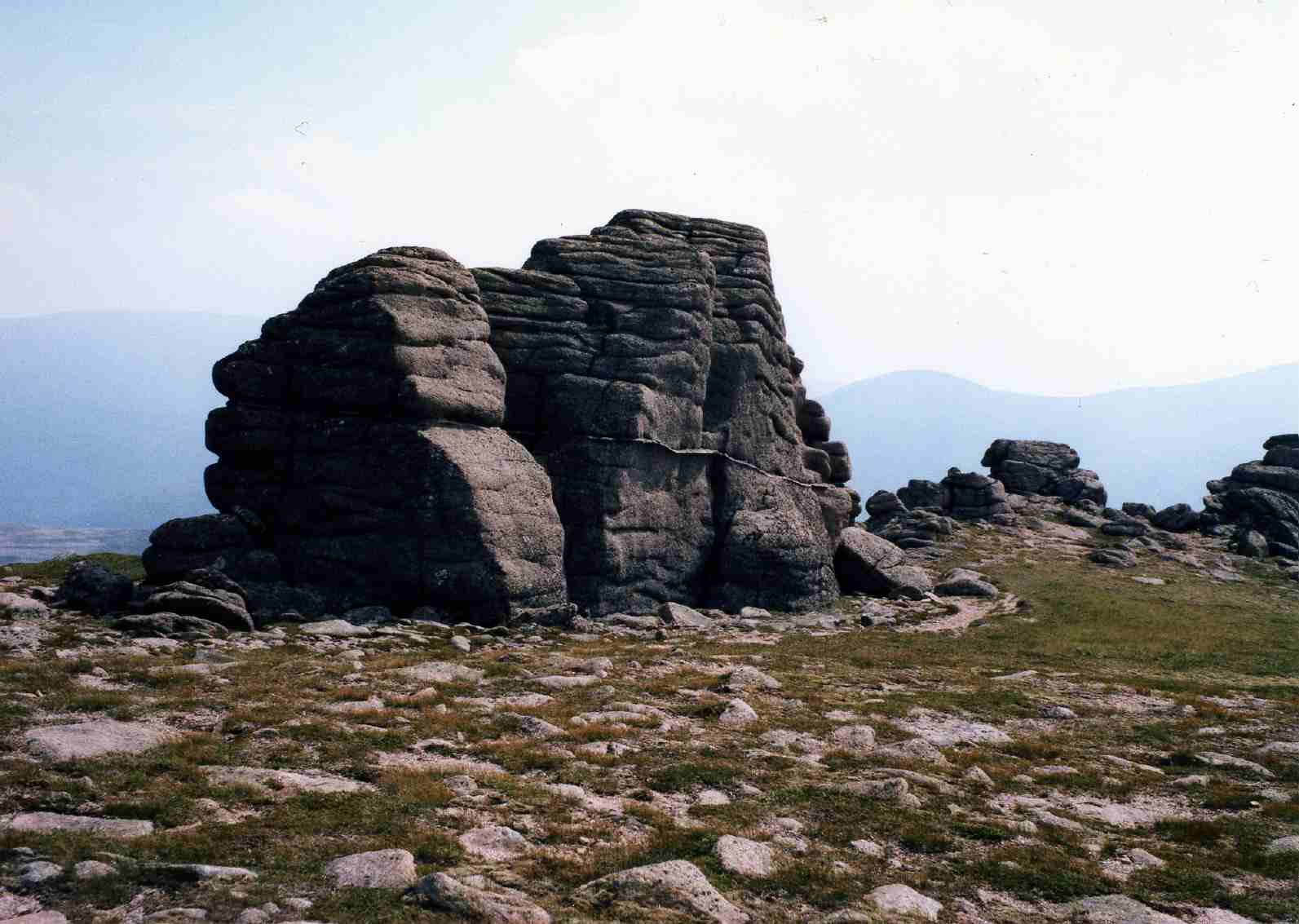
Tor on Bynack More

Tors are a common feature of the Cairngorm granite massif, being especially frequent on Ben Avon and Beinn Mheadhoin and impressively high on Bynack More. They represent masses of granite which are less closely jointed than surrounding rock and which have therefore been less susceptible to underground weathering associated with fluid percolation along joints. The present tors have been exhumed, over a long period of time, not least by periglacial processes associated with ice ages during the Quaternary period.

== Economic geology ==
Lead and manganese were obtained from the Lecht Mine southeast of Tomintoul during the 18th and early 19th centuries. Extraction of aggregate for the dualling of a further section of the A9 trunk road commenced at Dalwhinnie Quarry in 2022, involving the expansion of this pre-existing site. A further quarry at Meadowside, Kincraig near Kingussie has also been used similarly in connection with the A9 dualling.

== Geological conservation and protection ==
The National Park Authority commissioned a report which identified 89 sites suitable for designation as Local Geodiversity Sites of which about 40% focus on bedrock whilst the remainder address the area's outstanding Quaternary interest.
