= Geology of national parks in Britain =

The geology of national parks in Britain strongly influences the landscape character of each of the fifteen such areas which have been designated. There are ten national parks in England, three in Wales and two in Scotland. Ten of these were established in England and Wales in the 1950s under the provisions of the National Parks and Access to the Countryside Act 1949. With one exception, all of these first ten, together with the two Scottish parks were centred on upland or coastal areas formed from Palaeozoic rocks. The exception is the North York Moors National Park which is formed from sedimentary rocks of Jurassic age.

Three new national parks have been created in lowland England since the late 1980s, these being the Broads, South Downs and New Forest national parks. (Strictly speaking the Broads was not created as a national park but the Broads Authority has since adopted the name for marketing purposes.) The landscape of these areas reflects the fact that they are all established on rocks and sediments of Mesozoic and Cenozoic age.

== Brecon Beacons ==
Old Red Sandstone is the dominant rock within the Brecon Beacons National Park, forming peaks such as Pen y Fan, Sugar Loaf and the Carmarthen Fans but to the south of these Devonian rocks, a narrow band of Carboniferous Limestone stretches east–west through the park. It gives rise to characteristically karstic landscapes and hosts Britain's deepest (Ogof Ffynnon Ddu at 274.5m) and several of its longest caves such as Ogof Draenen and Ogof Agen Allwedd. The Brecon Beacons were glaciated during the last ice age and cirque lakes such as those at Llyn Cwm Llwch and Llyn y Fan Fach are amongst the most popular destinations for visitors.

== The Broads ==
The Broads are underlain by a suite of generally flat-lying sedimentary rock types of which the most recent are those of Neogene age. Almost entirely covered by more recent superficial deposits, they are exposed at the surface to a very limited extent or else are known from boreholes or quarry workings. The area was covered by the southern edge of an icesheet during the Anglian glaciation which left spreads of glacial debris or till. Overlying these across much the larger part of the 'national park' are silts and clays of Flandrian age, which together with peat deposits form the broad flats of the Waveney, Yare, Bure and Thurne valleys. Extraction of the peat in historic times, and subsequent flooding of the workings, has resulted in the pattern of shallow lakes or 'broads for which the area is widely known.

== Cairngorms ==
The majority of the rocks within the Cairngorms National Park belong to the Dalradian Supergroup, a thick sequence of sands, muds and limestones that were deposited between about 800 and 600 million years ago on the margins of the former continent of Laurentia. Rocks now ascribed to the Moine Supergroup occur along the northwestern edge of the Park.

The Dalradian and Moine successions were intensely faulted, folded and metamorphosed during the Caledonian Orogeny between about 490 and 430 million years ago Geologists recognize a ‘Grampian event’, centred around 470 million years ago, which was responsible for the initial deformation of the Dalradian and relates to the collision of a volcanic island arc with Laurentia over a period of about 20 million years. The subsequent collision of Baltica with Laurentia caused the ‘Scandian event’ which involved further folding and faulting of the Dalradian rock sequence. The Great Glen, Ericht-Laidon and Glen Tilt faults were all active as strike-slip faults at this time and may have played a part in allowing large plutons of granite to rise up amongst the Dalradian rocks and then cool in situ.

The largest of these plutons is the granite mass which forms the Cairngorms themselves and which was emplaced around 427 million years ago. It is thought that the pluton had been unroofed within 20 million years of its emplacement and that the present landscape of the Cairngorms had begun to form by 390 million years ago. Evidence suggests that the granite currently at the surface was initially to be found at a depth of between 4 and 7km.

Other than a small outlier of Old Red Sandstone, there are no younger solid rocks within the National Park. The ice ages of the last 2.5 million years have however left their mark both in terms of erosional and depositional features. Post-glacial features include peat and landslips.

== Dartmoor ==
The geology of the national park comprises a 625 km^{2} (241 mi^{2}) core of granite intruded during the early Permian period into a sequence of sedimentary rocks originating in the Devonian and Carboniferous periods. These rocks were faulted and folded, sometimes, intensely, during the Variscan orogeny. Thermal metamorphism has also taken place around the margins of the granite pluton altering the character of the sedimentary rocks whilst mineral veins were emplaced within the granite. A small outlier of Palaeogene sediments occurs on the eastern boundary of the national park.

The area was not subject to glaciation during the Quaternary ice ages but periglacial processes have contributed to the character of the modern landscape. Tin mining and the quarrying of granite were some of the area's significant extractive industries in the past whilst tourism based in large part upon the perceived quality of the area's landscape is important for the modern economy.

== Exmoor ==
Exmoor is formed largely by a suite of mudstones and sandstones of Devonian age which are folded into a broad east–west oriented anticline during the Variscan orogeny and well exposed along the Bristol Channel coast. There are Triassic sandstones in the area around Minehead and a small outlier of the Jurassic Lias. Exmoor lay just to the south of the Quaternary ice-sheets but deposits of head (frost-shattered rock fragments building on and at the foot of hillsides) date from this time.

== Lake District ==
The Lake District National Park is formed from a core of lower Palaeozoic sedimentary and volcanic rocks, underpinned by a granitic batholith. This sequence was intensely faulted and folded during the Caledonian orogeny and is surrounded by a relatively unaffected Carboniferous succession of limestones and sandstones with Triassic sandstones along the southwest coastal strip. It was heavily glaciated during the succession of Quaternary glaciations giving rise to many features in its landscape such as glacial cirques and tarns, aretes and finger lakes for which it is well-known.

== Loch Lomond and The Trossachs ==
Loch Lomond and The Trossachs National Park is a mountainous region with good exposure of the Proterozoic and Palaeozoic bedrock. The northeast – southwest aligned Highland Boundary Fault forms a major geological divide between the generally older rocks to its northwest, assigned to the Dalradian Supergroup, and the younger Devonian rocks to its southeast, assigned to the Old Red Sandstone. The Argyll Group comprises the older division of the Dalradian; these occur along the northern margin of the national park. The younger Southern Highland Group forms the larger part of the park.

A variety of igneous rocks intrude the Dalradian sequence, including dykes, sills and plutons. Along the Highland Boundary Fault is a zone of metamorphosed rocks grouped as the Highland Border Complex and dated to the Cambrian and Ordovician periods. There are outliers of Carboniferous age rocks to the east and west of Loch Lomond.

Landforms reflect the significant impact of glaciation on the area during the last and previous ice ages.

== New Forest ==
The geology of the New Forest comprises a succession of largely flat-lying sedimentary rocks of Palaeogene age laid down between about 66 and about 34 million years ago, in the centre of a sedimentary basin known as the Hampshire Basin. These are overlain by a variety of superficial deposits. There are few rock exposures beyond limited outcrops in the banks of streams, the faces of working and abandoned gravel pits, and some low coastal cliffs. However, temporary exposures during construction works and boreholes have added to earth scientists’ understanding of the area.

In broad terms, the oldest rocks occupy the northern part of the area with progressively younger rocks seen to the south, approaching the Solent coast. As elsewhere, the names of particular rock strata (and higher level groups) sometimes change as geological knowledge expands and research correlates strata in one area with those of another. Older literature and maps may therefore refer to different names.

== Northumberland ==
The highest parts of the Northumberland National Park are formed from a Devonian granite intrusion surrounded by a suite of extrusive igneous rocks from the Silurian and Devonian periods, between them creating the Cheviot Hills. The rest of the park is formed from gently dipping sedimentary rocks of Carboniferous age. The sedimentary rocks are intruded by the Great Whin Sill along the outcrop of which the Romans built sections of Hadrian's Wall. Zones of thermal metamorphism affect the sedimentary rocks adjacent to the igneous intrusions. Extensive re-moulding of the land surface took place during the Quaternary ice ages.

== North York Moors ==
The North York Moors National Park is formed from Jurassic age sandstones, mudstones and siltstones and limestones, many of which are well exposed in the cliffs of the park's North Sea coast (which is often referred to as the 'Dinosaur Coast'. The southerly regional dip of the rock strata has produced a landscape of multiple scarps and dip-slopes with the older rocks exposed in the north and progressively younger ones to the south such as the Tabular Hills formed from late Jurassic age limestones. The moors were not glaciated during the last ice age but ice sheets surrounded the area and led to the formation of glacial lakes around the hills and the development of major meltwater channels such as Newton Dale.

== Peak District ==
The Peak District is split between the Dark Peak in the north, and around the park's eastern and western margins, and the White Peak which forms the core of the park in the south, corresponding broadly to the major exposed areas of the Millstone Grit and the Carboniferous Limestone. The exposed central limestone strata and surrounding gritstone edges are the result of erosion of the Derbyshire Dome formation.

== Pembrokeshire Coast ==
The Pembrokeshire Coast National Park is formed from igneous, sedimentary and metamorphic rocks from the late Precambrian through all Palaeozoic periods to the Carboniferous. The coastal cliffs expose each of these rocks extensively.

== Snowdonia ==
The geology of Snowdonia is largely characterized by a succession of sedimentary and extrusive igneous rocks of Cambrian, Ordovician and Silurian age which were faulted and folded during the Caledonian Orogeny. West of Harlech is an area of much younger rocks though these are wholly concealed by superficial deposits.

Mining and quarrying have played a significant part in the economy of the area, notably for slate around Llanberis, Bethesda and Ffestiniog.

== South Downs ==
The South Downs National Park is centred on the South Downs which are formed from chalk which dates from the Cretaceous period though it extends into the Weald which is formed from older rocks such as the Upper and Lower Greensands, Wealden Group sandstones and mudstones and Gault clay. The Malmstone is a chalky sandstone which characterises parts of the national park in East Hampshire and West Sussex

== Yorkshire Dales ==
The Yorkshire Dales National Park is formed principally from sandstones, mudstones and limestones of Carboniferous age though includes Silurian sandstones and shales in the Howgill Fells in the northwest part of the park. The geological succession of the Yorkshire Dales is that of Carboniferous Limestone, overlain by the Yoredale Series which is in turn overlain by the Millstone Grit. The V-profile river valleys that had been cut into this upland area during the previous tens of millions of years were modified by widespread glaciation during successive Quaternary ice ages resulting in the present day landforms. Extensive development of karst resulted in England's greatest concentration of limestone pavements and cave systems including the Three Counties System, which is the UK's longest at over 86km.
