= Port Askaig Tillite Formation =

Geological formation in Scotland and Ireland

- Stratigraphic range: 717–660 Ma
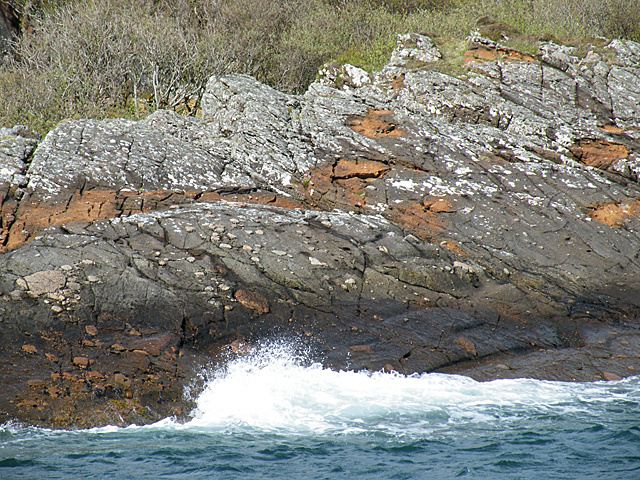
- One of the diamictite beds on Garbh Eileach
- Type: Geological formation
- Unit of: Argyll Group
- Underlies: Bonahaven Formation
- Overlies: Garbh Eileach Formation, Lossit Limestone Formation
- Thickness: up to 1,100 metres (3,610 ft)

Lithology
- Primary: Diamictite, sandstone
- Other: Siltstone, dolomite

Location
- Country: Scotland, Ireland

Type section
- Named for: Port Askaig

The Port Askaig Tillite Formation (PATF) (also known as the Port Askaig Formation) is a sequence of glacigenic sedimentary rocks deposited during the Cryogenian period of the Neoproterozoic era, forming part of the Dalradian Supergroup. It is exposed along the Dalradian outcrop from Galway, Mayo and Donegal in Ireland in the west through Islay and the Garvellachs in the Inner Hebrides to Schiehallion, Braemar and Fordyce to the east on mainland Scotland. The formation records a time in Earth's history where there were repeated glaciations where ice sheets extended to low latitudes, sometimes referred to as a Snowball Earth.

== Occurrence ==
The PATF forms scattered outcrops along the whole ca. 600 km extent of the Dalradian Supergroup. It is always metamorphosed and variably deformed as a result of the Grampian Orogeny. The thickness of this unit varies greatly across the outcrop, with its thickest development, estimated at 1,100 m, in the Inner Hebrides on the Garvallachs and Islay. The type section is found on Islay, near Port Askaig, for which the formation is named. This area has been identified as a major depocentre for the Argyll Group, possibly as a result of active extensional faulting. Even in this area the unit thins markedly to the west and the base is marked by an unconformity with the underlying Lossit Limestone Formation, part of the older Appin Group. On Garbh Eileach, the largest island of the Garvallachs, the base of the PATF is conformable, following on from the Garbh Eileach Formation of the uppermost Appin Group. On Islay the top of the PATF is marked by a transition to the mixed siliciclastic-carbonate Bonahaven Formation. In this central area the sequence is extremely well exposed and the deformation state is generally low, meaning that original sedimentary structures are well-preserved, allowing for confident environmental interpretation.

== Interpretation ==
The PATF is subdivided into five members the lowest (oldest) three of which are particularly well-exposed on the Garvallachs. The sequence contains 48 beds of diamictite interbedded with sandstones of non-glacial origin, forming 35–40% of the unit, typically deposited in deltaic to shallow water marine environments. The rest of the formation is made up of minor amounts of siltstones and dolomites. The diamictites, rocks consisting of large to very large clasts set in a finer-grained matrix, are interpreted to be tillites of glacial origin. The sediments are organised into units interpreted to represent 28 periods of glaciation, 25 periods where glacial conditions were close (peri-glacial) and 23 non-glacial episodes. The onset of the earliest of the glacial cycles is recognised within the uppermost part of the Garbh Eileach Formation. The end of the overall glacial interval is unclear, although the uppermost member only has a few, thin diamictite beds. There is nothing within the overlying Bonahaven Formation that matches a typical Cap carbonate.

== Correlation ==
During the Neoproterozoic cold period, the Cryogenian, there are two globally distributed glacial sequences, the older Sturtian glaciation (~717–660 million years ago} and the younger Marinoan glaciation (<654–632 million years ago), both of which are regarded as probable examples of a Snowball Earth, where ice sheets extended to very low latitudes. The PATF has been correlated with both of these. A number of techniques have been used to reduce the uncertainty. Rhenium–osmium dating has been carried out on pyrite grains found within layered baryte deposits that are part of the Easdale Subgroup of the Argyll Group. This gives values of 604.0 ± 7.2 Ma and 612.1 ± 18.6 Ma, which can be compared to earlier dating of the Tayvallich Volcanic Formation within the overlying Tayvallich Subgroup, of 595 ± 4 Ma and 601 ± 4 Ma, using U-Pb and Sm-Nd methods. These results suggest that the PATF is best correlated with the Marinoan glaciation. Detrital zircon analysis has also been carried out on zircon grains from the sandstones interbedded within the PATF. The results support the sequence being Sturtian in age, with "youngest single grains" throughout being consistent with the likely depositional ages.
