= List of listed buildings in Kirkmichael, Moray =

This is a list of listed buildings in the parish of Kirkmichael in Moray, Scotland.

== List ==
Name	Location	Date Listed	Grid Ref. (Note: Sometimes known as OSGB36, the grid reference (where provided) is based on the British national grid reference system used by the Ordnance Survey. • "Guide to National Grid". Ordnance Survey. • "Get-a-map". Ordnance Survey.)	Geo-coordinates	Notes	LB Number (Note: Historic Environment Scotland assign a unique alphanumeric identifier to each designated site in Scotland, for listed buildings this always begins with "LB", for example "LB12345".)	Image
Inverlochy				57°18′01″N 3°25′51″W	Category B	8921	Upload Photo
Tomintoul, Church Of Scotland Manse				57°15′18″N 3°23′00″W	Category B	8928	Upload Photo
Tomintoul, 2 The Square				57°15′07″N 3°22′43″W	Category B	8930	Upload Photo
Kylnadrochit And Stables				57°15′42″N 3°24′44″W	Category B	8923	Upload Photo
Lecht, Ironstone Mine Building (Lecht Mine)				57°13′40″N 3°15′52″W	Category B	8924	Upload another image
Tomintoul, Roman Catholic Church Of Our Lady And St Michael (Incorporating Presbytery) And Burial Ground				57°14′59″N 3°22′40″W	Category B	8929	Upload another image
Bridge Of Avon (Formerly Bridge Of Campdalemore) Over River Avon				57°15′50″N 3°24′42″W	Category B	8919	Upload Photo
Ruthven Farmhouse				57°16′49″N 3°24′32″W	Category C(S)	8926	Upload Photo
Tomintoul Parish Church (Church Of Scotland), And Burial Ground				57°15′17″N 3°22′59″W	Category B	8927	Upload another image
By Tomintoul, Bridge Of Conglass Over Conglass Water				57°15′18″N 3°22′04″W	Category C(S)	8932	Upload Photo
Kirkmichael Parish Church (Church Of Scotland) And Burial Ground				57°17′51″N 3°25′22″W	Category C(S)	8922	Upload Photo
Ballantruan				57°18′36″N 3°25′02″W	Category A	8918	Upload Photo
Croughly, Garden Walls And Gatepiers				57°16′30″N 3°22′16″W	Category B	8920	Upload Photo
Tomintoul, The Square, Fountain				57°15′07″N 3°22′45″W	Category C(S)	8931	Upload another image
Lecht, Well Of The Lecht				57°13′15″N 3°16′09″W	Category B	8925	Upload another image

== Key ==
The scheme for classifying buildings in Scotland is:

- Category A: "buildings of national or international importance, either architectural or historic; or fine, little-altered examples of some particular period, style or building type."
- Category B: "buildings of regional or more than local importance; or major examples of some particular period, style or building type, which may have been altered."
- Category C: "buildings of local importance; lesser examples of any period, style, or building type, as originally constructed or moderately altered; and simple traditional buildings which group well with other listed buildings."

In March 2016 there were 47,288 listed buildings in Scotland. Of these, 8% were Category A, and 50% were Category B, with the remaining 42% being Category C.

== See also ==
- List of listed buildings in Moray
