= Fitful Head =

Headland in the Shetland Islands, Scotland

Coordinates: 59°54′21″N 1°22′56″W

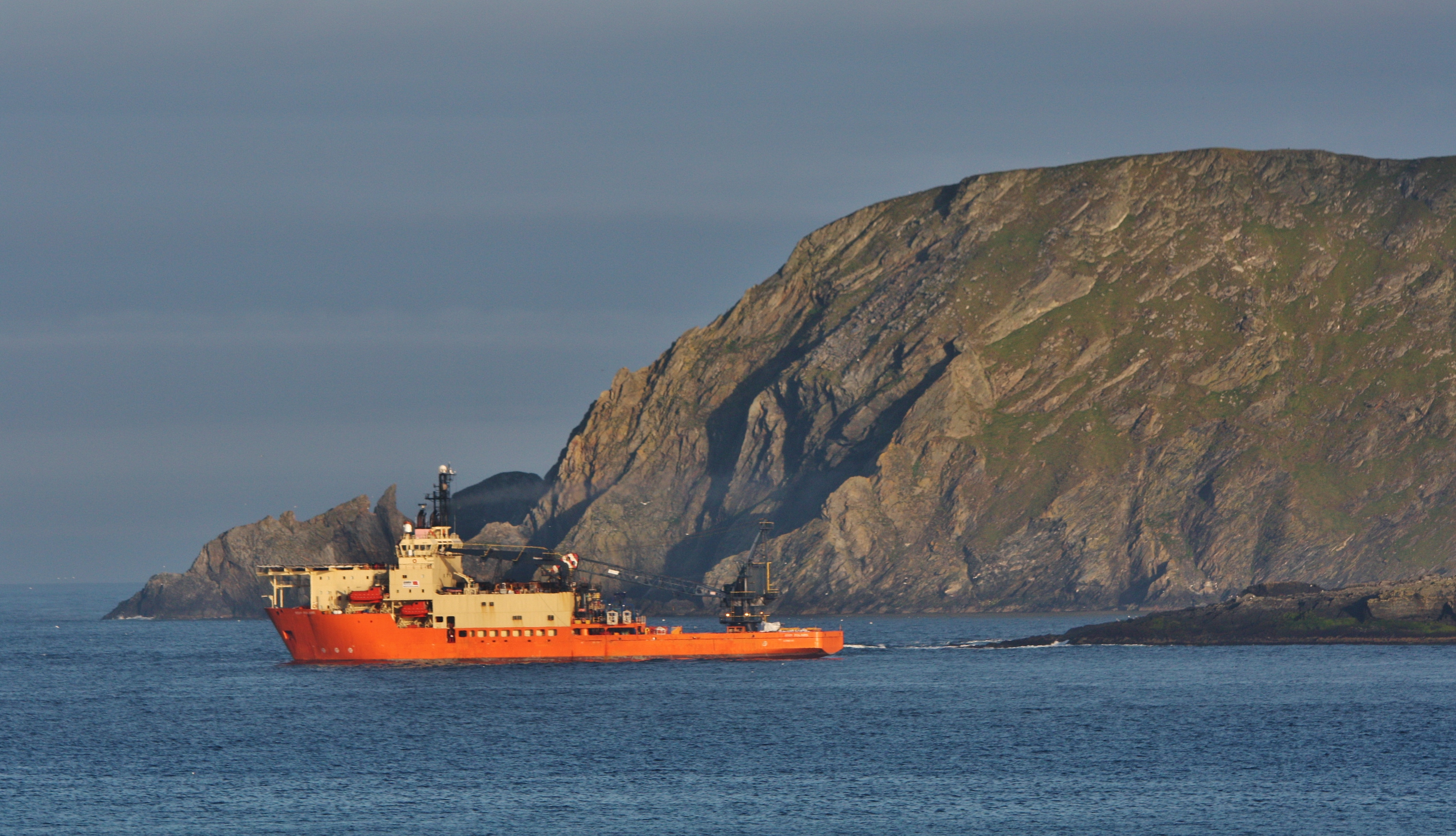
Fitful Head

Fitful Head (Shaetlan pronunciation: [ˈfɪtfəɫ ˌhɛɪd]) is a 283-metre-high (928 ft) headland at the southwest corner of Mainland, Shetland, Scotland, some 6 kilometres (3.7 mi) northwest of the island's southernmost point at Sumburgh Head. Its summit is crowned by a trig point adjacent to a NATS installation served by a restricted access vehicular track which ascends from the hamlet of Quendale to the east. There are numerous islets and sea stacks at the foot of the 3-kilometre (1.9 mi) stretch of cliffs which form the coast here.

The summit and eastern slopes are formed from Neoproterozoic (late Precambrian) age metamorphic rocks assigned to the Dunrossness Phyllitic Formation, which is placed within the Cliff Hills Division and equates with the Southern Highland Group of the Dalradian suite of rocks of mainland Scotland. The steep cliffs dropping down to the sea are formed mostly from a silica-poor igneous intrusion, itself subject to metamorphism. The upper eastern slopes have a cover of peat.

The area is known for its breeding bonxies.

Just beneath the clifftop is a cave known as Thief's House, reckoned to be the spot referred to by Sir Walter Scott in his 1821 novel The Pirate, where "Norma of the Fitful Head" lived.
