= Kenneth Boyd Fraser =

British virologist

Prof Kenneth Boyd Fraser FRSE MC (10 March 1917 – 17 July 2001) was a British virologist and hero of the Second World War. He was known to friends as Kenny Fraser. He introduced Immunofluorescence in both academic and clinical fields. He discovered a link between the measles virus and multiple sclerosis.

== Life ==
He was born in Aberdeen on 10 March 1917, the son of Kenneth Fraser and Mary Fraser (née Boyd). He studied medicine at Aberdeen University graduating MB ChB in 1940.

In 1941, he joined the Royal Army Medical Corps and given the rank of captain. He was posted to the Chin Hills in Burma. Here a combined British and Indian force fought Japanese troops. In 1943 Fraser won the Military Cross for rescuing a sepoy whilst under heavy fire and then carrying him on his back 3 km over rough terrain to a place of safety.

He returned to Aberdeen University after the war as a lecturer in the Department of Bacteriology. He was given his doctorate in 1950. Being awarded a Nuffield Grant, he spent part of 1951 and 1952 in Australia working with Sir MacFarlane Burnet at the Walter and Eliza Hall Institute of Medical Research. Here he did a series of critical experiments on the influenza virus genome. In 1959 he moved from Aberdeen to Glasgow University as senior lecturer in the Institute of Virology.

In 1961 he was elected a Fellow of the Royal Society of Edinburgh. His proposers were Guido Pontecorvo, Daniel Fowler Cappell, Norman Davidson, and William Ogilvy Kermack.

In 1966 he was appointed professor of microbiology at Queen's University Belfast. On his death he left £50,000 to the university to fund the Kenneth B Fraser Memorial Lecture.

In 1982 he retired to Altnaha near Tomintoul. He died on 17 July 2001.

== Publications ==
- Measles Virus and Its Biology (1978)
- Don't Believe A Word Of It (a memoir of his days in the Chin Hills)

== Family ==
In 1948 he married Dr Leslie Fraser who predeceased him.
