= Highland Border Ophiolite =

The Highland Border Ophiolite (HBO) is a set of rocks that are ophiolitic in character found within the Highland Border Complex. They are exposed in a series of fault-bounded outcrops along the line of the Highland Boundary Fault that forms the southeastern boundary to the Grampian Highlands in Scotland. They represent fragments of a piece of oceanic crust or exhumed mantle that has been obducted onto continental crust. These rocks provide an important constraint on models of how the current geometry arose during the Caledonian Orogeny.

== Lithology ==
The main lithologies found within the HBO are serpentinite, often in the form of ophicarbonate, with associated sedimentary rocks, including sandstone, limestone, chert and black mudstone (now black slate). The serpentinite is interpreted to be derived from exhumed mantle peridotites, altered to serpentinite at the seafloor. This is consistent with the presence of ophicarbonates that are associated with serpentinization in such an environment.

== Interpretation ==
The parts of the Highland Border Complex that are not ophiolitic have been assigned to the Trossachs Group, interpreted to be the youngest part of the Dalradian Supergroup, although this interpretation has been questioned. The Trossachs Group as interpreted ranges in age from Lower Cambrian to Lower Ordovician, based on trilobite fossils found in the Leny Limestone and conodont fossils found in the Margie Limestone. There is evidence that the HBO was thrust on top of the Trossachs Group before the first phase of the Caledonian Orogeny (the Grampian phase) affected either of these units later in the Ordovician. In this model, the HBO represents pieces of exhumed mantle from the non-volcanic margin of Laurentia, transported onto the Dalradian Supergroup with its sedimentary cover.

The HBO has been correlated with the Deerpark Complex of western Ireland, which consists of fault-bounded lenses of serpentinite, juxtaposed with amphibolites and metasediments. It is faulted against the Clew Bay Complex, which has been correlated with the Highland Border Complex.
