= Lynbreck Croft =

Coordinates: 57.278677°N 3.560175°W

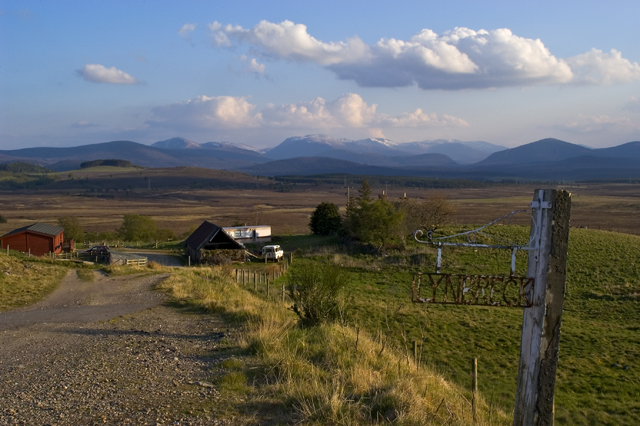
Lynbreck (Note: The name is "Lynebreck" on Ordnance Survey maps.) in 2005 with the Cairngorms beyond

Lynbreck Croft is a 59-hectare (150-acre) farm near Tomintoul in the Highlands of Scotland. The land is held under crofting tenure and the activities of start-up farmers Lynn Cassells and Sandra Baer were showcased on the BBC programme This Farming Life in 2019. The property enjoys the “magnificent backdrop of the Cairngorms”.

== Farming activities ==
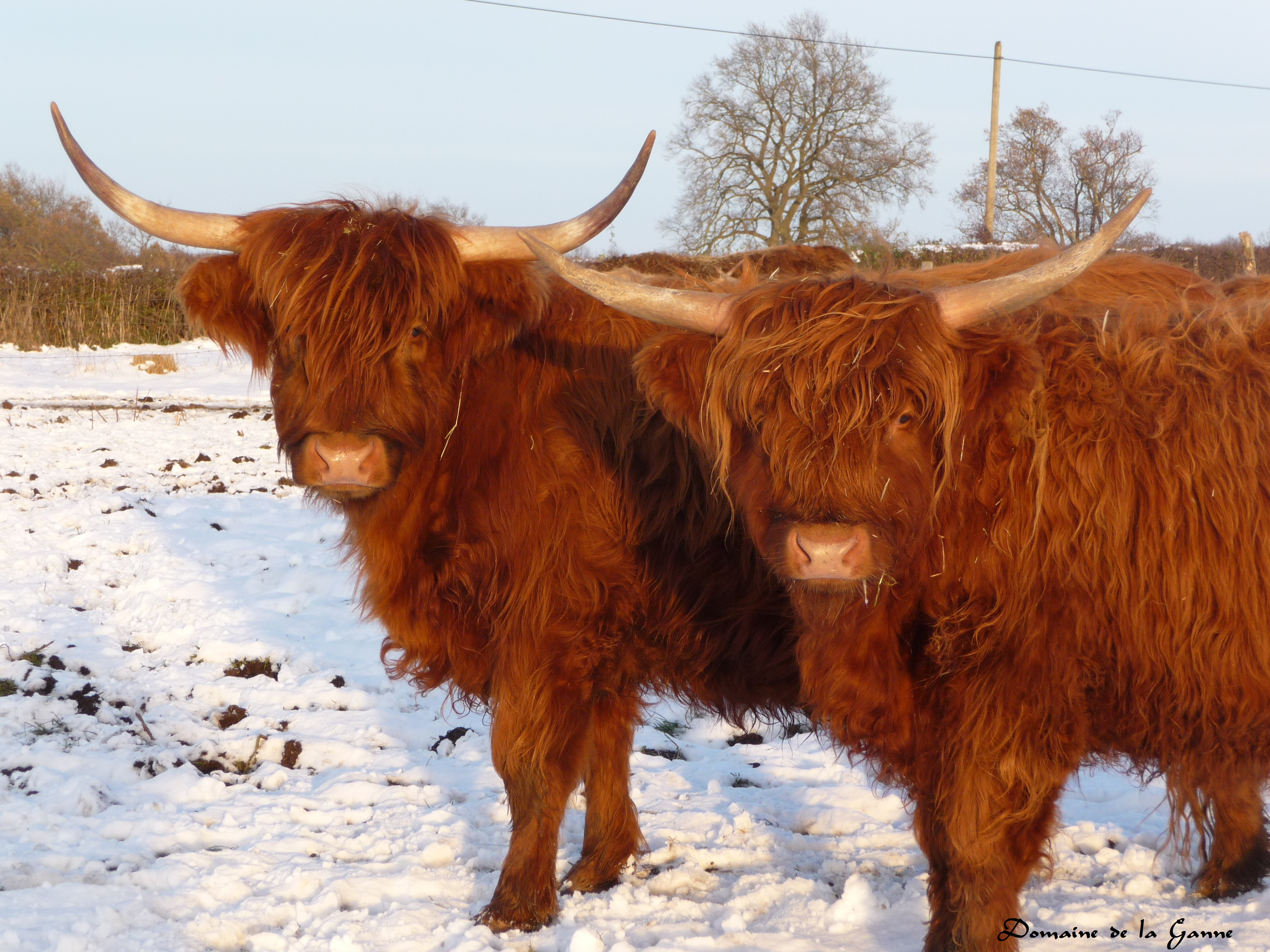
The hair on Highland cattle protects them during cold winters

Located in Strathspey at a height of about 350 metres (1,150 ft) above sea level, Lynbreck Croft was purchased by Cassells and Baer in 2016.

They had been working as rangers for the National Trust in southern England but shared “this pipe dream of living closer to the land and having more connection with the food we eat.” Originally looking for a small holding of up to 4 hectares (9.9 acres) in size they “instantly fell in love” with Lynbreck when they visited it and set about re-creating the property as a viable farm after three decades of neglect.

They practice regenerative agriculture using rotational grazing and see themselves as “nature friendly farmers”. They have planted up to 30,000 trees on the croft and as of 2019 they have nine Highland cattle, 70 laying hens, 12 rare breed Oxford Sandy and Black pigs and 6 beehives.

== Media interest and awards ==
In 2018 they won Best Crofting Newcomer awarded by the Scottish Crofting Federation at the Spirit of Crofting Festival and the Cairngorms Nature Farm Award awarded by the Cairngorms National Park Authority.

In 2019 Cassells and Baer (who come from Irish and Swiss backgrounds respectively) featured in the third series of This Farming Life in 2019 from episode 3 onwards. Interviewed about the filming, they said: “It was a terrifying experience to begin with, as we were doing everything for the first time and we were doing it in front of cameras”.

In 2019 they also won the Nature of Scotland Food and Farming Award, sponsored by The James Hutton Institute and were the UK winners of the Newbie award for innovative new entrants.
