= Grampian Group =

- Stratigraphic range: Neoproterozoic
- Type: Group
- Unit of: Dalradian Supergroup
- Underlies: Appin Group
- Overlies: ?Badenoch Group

Lithology
- Primary: Psammite
- Other: semipelite, Quartzite

Location
- Region: Central Highlands

Type section
- Named for: Grampian Mountains

The Grampian Group is an estimated 9,000 m thick sequence of metamorphosed Neoproterozoic sedimentary rocks that outcrop across the Central Highlands of Scotland, east of the Great Glen. It forms a part of the Dalradian Supergroup. The sequence thickness at any one place is limited to 5km.

== Stratigraphy ==
The Glenshirra Subgroup is the lowermost (oldest) part of the succession. These rocks reflect deposition within shallow marine and fluvial environments. It is overlain by the thick sequence of proximal and distal turbidites of the Corrieyairack Subgroup which is in turn overlain by the Glen Spean Subgroup reflective of the infilling of the Corrieyairack, Strath Tummel and Cromdale depositional basins. The Bowmore Sandstone of the Highland Border Complex is correlated with the Corrieyairack Subgroup. Rock successions in Shetland and Islay may also be correlated with this succession.
