= Kirkmichael, Moray =

Civil parish in Moray, Scotland

Coordinates: 57°18′32″N 3°25′4″W

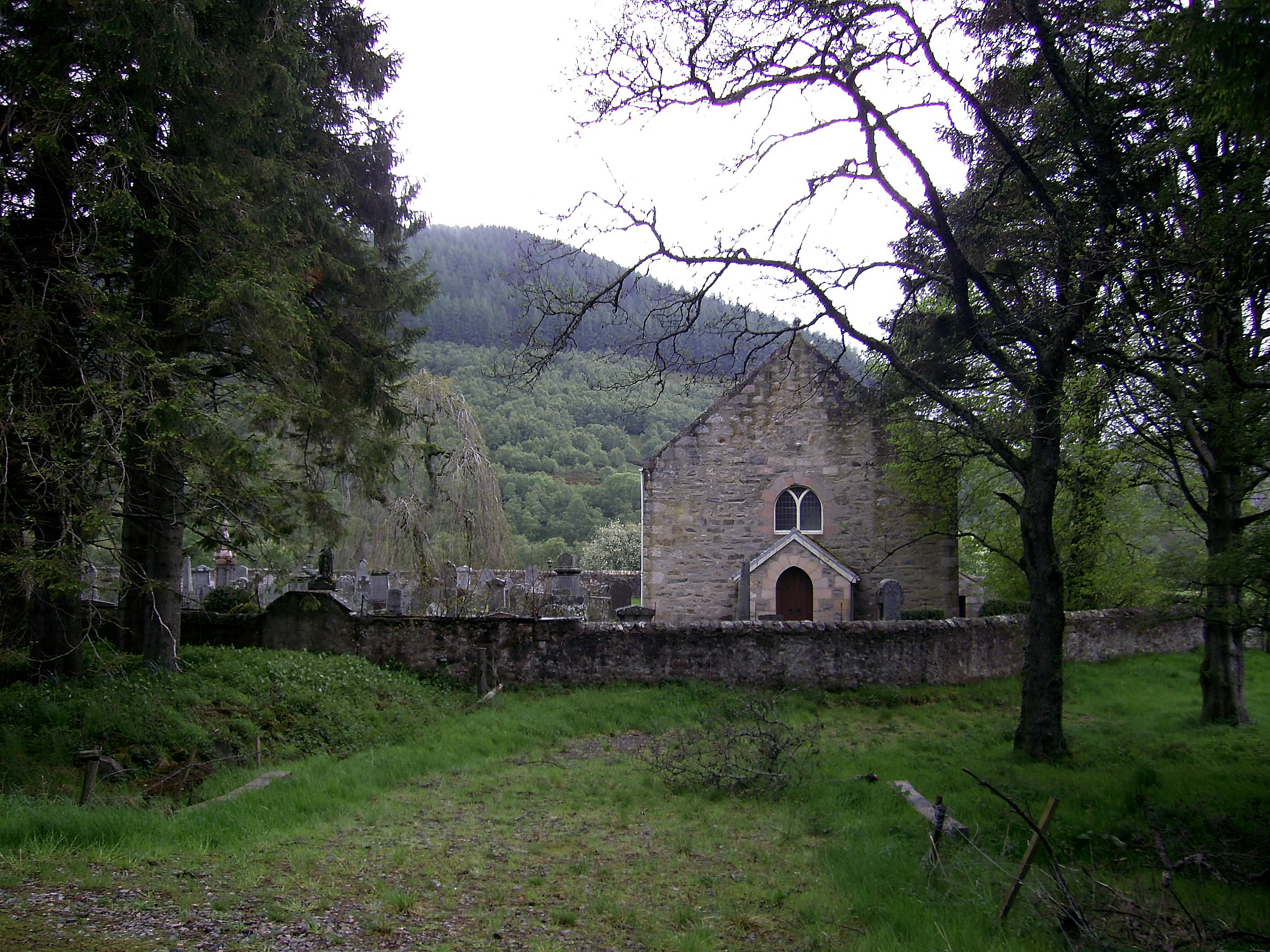
Kirkmichael church and Cnoc Fergan hill in the parish of Kirkmichael

Kirkmichael is a parish in the council area of Moray, Scotland. It lies south of Ballindalloch and includes the Tomintoul Distillery.

== Geography ==
The parish includes the largely unpopulated upper Stratha'an up to and including Loch A'an and the Shelter Stone. The village of Tomintoul is the largest settlement and the total area of the parish is 305.8 km^{2} (118 sq mi).

== Demography ==
In 1798 the parish was populated by 892 members of the Church of Scotland and 384 Roman Catholics, making the total population 1,276. In 2011 the figure was 606 and by 2022 it had declined further to 472. In 2001 Tomintoul's population was 322.

== History ==
Stratha'an was a provincial lordship first recorded between 1194 and 1198 that was coextensive with the parishes of Kirkmichael and Inveravon, the latter lying further down the strath. The parish was part of Banffshire until the county was abolished in 1974.

St Michael's church, from which the parish takes its name, is located on the west bank of the River Avon south of its confluence with the Burn of Lochy and close to the B9136 road. The church and burial ground are Category C listed. The church in its current rectangle form dates to 1807 but was substantially repaired in 1951 following a fire. A chapel existed before the current church but the exact position is unknown. There is an historic stone cross in the churchyard known as St Michael's Cross.

There are several other listed buildings in Kirkmichael. One notable example is the Category A mid-18th century Ballantruan Farm, located near the Tomintoul distillery. The Ballantruan woodlands lie to the east of the farm.
