= Lecht Mine =

Iron/manganese mine in Moray, Scotland

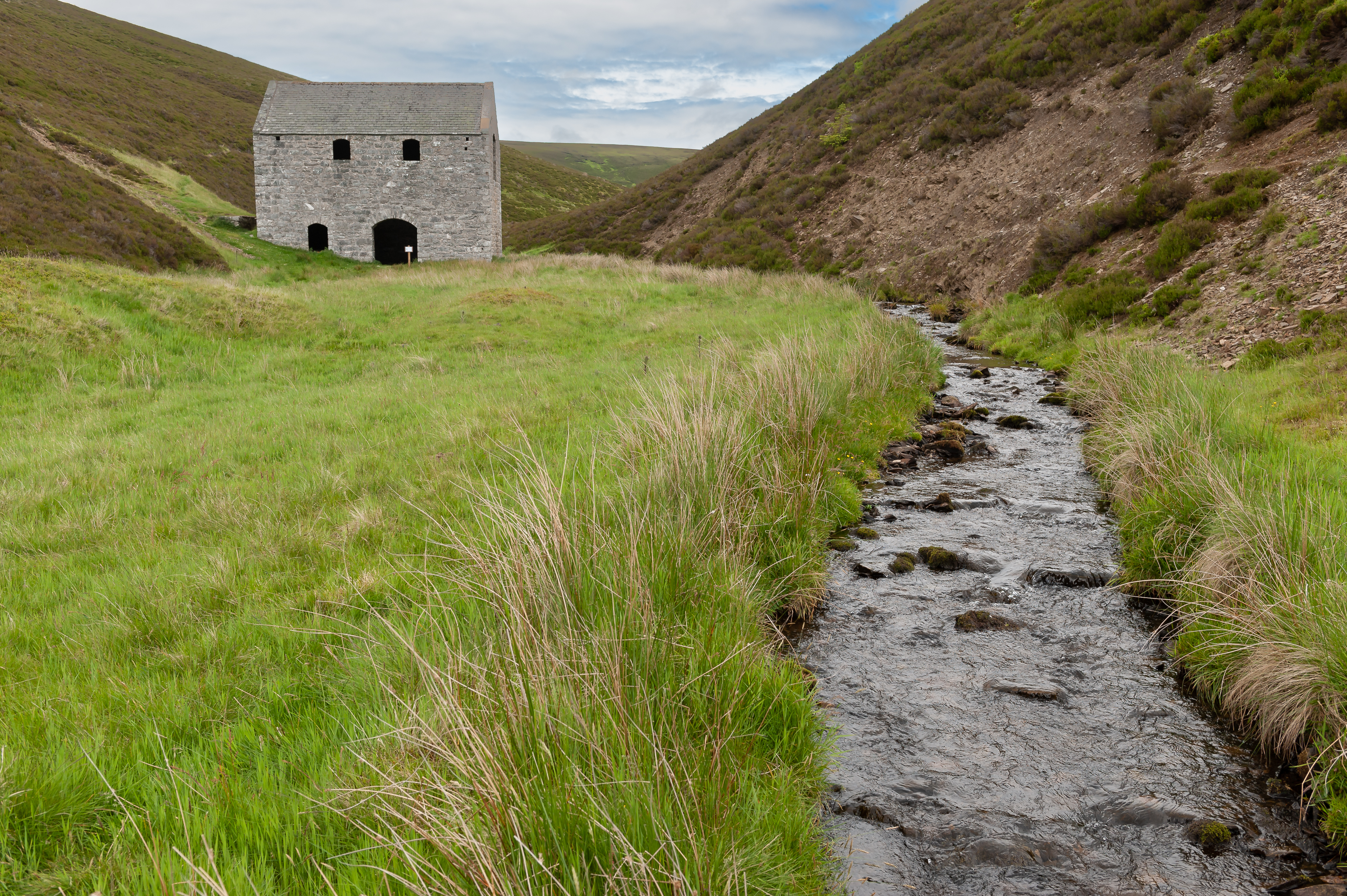
Lecht Mine

Lecht Mine is a former iron and manganese mining site located in the parish of Kirkmichael, Moray, Scotland. Today only the building of the crushing plant remains. It is a listed building number 74949.

== History ==
Iron ore was mined between 1730 and 1737, whereas, from 1841 on, manganese was mined. Due to decreasing prices, operations ceased again in 1846. At the peak, over 60 men worked at the mine.

In the 1920s iron ore from the Lecht was analysed in order to possibly justify the building of a railway to Tomintoul, but the results were not satisfying.

In 1983, the building was restored by Moray District Council.
