= Grampian orogeny =

The Grampian orogeny was an orogeny (mountain building event) that affected Scotland in the middle of the Ordovician. At the time, Scotland was part of proto-North American continent Laurentia.

The orogeny is an early phase of the Caledonian orogeny and overlapped in time with the orogenies that formed the Appalachian Mountains. It was the only orogeny in Laurentia at that time which resulted in deformation, folding and metamorphism. The Fleur de Lys rocks in Newfoundland may have been affected by the Grampian orogeny as well.

== Sequence of the Grampian orogeny ==
In the Cambrian and early Ordovician, shallow water carbonates and deep water turbidite basins, which formed the Southern Highland Group, dominated the section of the Laurentian coast that would be later separate to form Scotland. The Grampian orogeny stopped sedimentation. The discovery of volcanic arc rocks in western Ireland indicated a possible island arc collision with a subduction zone during the closure of the Iapetus Ocean to form Pangea. Some proposals in 1983 and 1984 suggested that the arc is buried under younger sediments in Scotland's Midland Valley.

During the collision at the edge of the Laurentian continent, an ophiolite nappe was overthrusted, possibly preserved in Unst, in the Shetland Islands. Other ophiolite zones at the Highland Border and Ballantrae may be from the same event.

The Grampian orogeny took place at close to the same time as the Taconic orogeny. In both cases, more extensive ophiolite nappes may have eroded away.

The Grampian orogeny deformed the rocks of the Grampian Terrane and the Dalradian Supergroup. Fold traces extend for hundreds of kilometers, with a complex formation of nappes and fold stacks.
