= Argyll Group =

Geological formation in Great Britain

- Stratigraphic range: Neoproterozoic
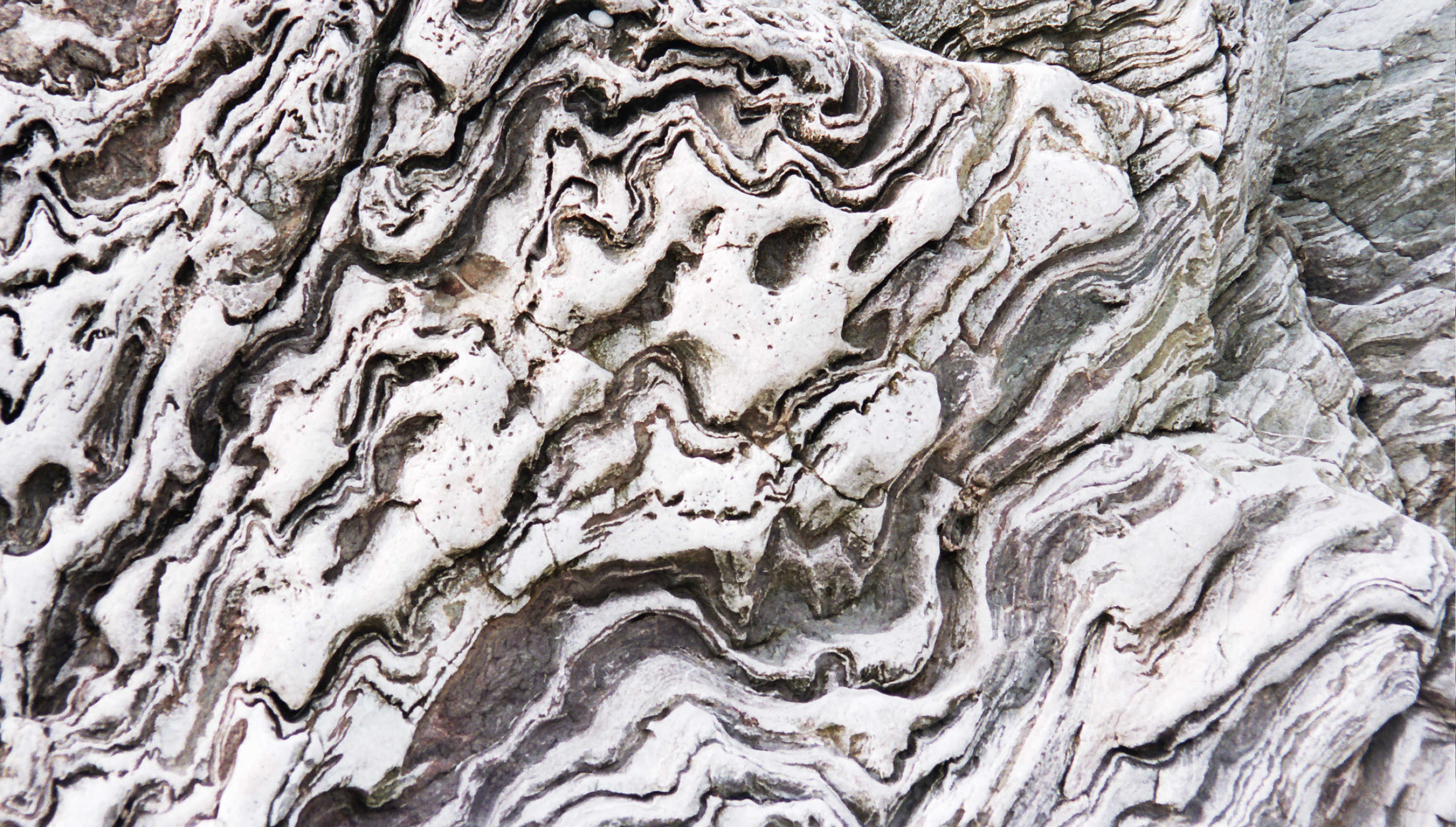
- Folded and metamorphosed limestone of the Boyne Bay Formation of the Tayvallich Subgroup (the upper part of the Argyll Group) in Boyne Bay, Aberdeenshire
- Type: Group
- Unit of: Dalradian Supergroup
- Sub-units: Islay, Easdale, Crinan and Tayvallich subgroups
- Underlies: Southern Highland Group
- Overlies: Appin Group
- Thickness: up to 9km

Lithology
- Primary: psammite
- Other: semipelite, pelite, quartzite, dolomite, conglomerate

Location
- Region: Scottish Highlands

Type section
- Named for: Argyll

The Argyll Group is a thick sequence of metamorphosed Neoproterozoic sedimentary rocks that outcrop across the Central Highlands of Scotland, east of the Great Glen, as well as appearing in the north of Ireland. It is a subdivision of the Dalradian Supergroup and is itself divided into four units; from oldest to youngest these are the Islay, Easdale, Crinan and Tayvallich subgroups.

== Islay Subgroup ==
The lower boundary of the Islay Subgroup and hence the Argyll Group as a whole is defined at the base of the Port Askaig Tillite Formation, a diamictite which displays limestone clasts overlain by quartzite and granite clasts. The tillite is thickest in its type area and on the Garvellachs. The Schiehallion Boulder Bed of the eastern Grampians correlates with this tillite. The tillite is overlain by the Bonahaven Dolomite and then the Jura Quartzite which can reach up to 5 km thick but which is more typically between 500 and 1000m thick. Psammites and pelites occur within the sequence in the Ladder Hills area.

== Easdale Subgroup ==
The Easdale Subgroup consists of a basal Scarba Conglomerate overlain by the Craignish Phyllite. It also includes pelites, semipelites, psammites and some volcaniclastic rocks. Extending between Jura, Knapdale and the Moray Firth coast, the unit can reach to 3 km thick.

== Crinan Subgroup ==
The Crinan Subgroup is formed by the Crinan Grits Formation, a submarine fan deposit. These rocks which are between 1.5 and 3 km thick, extend the width of Scotland from Kintyre to Fraserburgh. Their base is characterised by a coarse quartzite in Argyll, otherwise it is formed from pelites, semipelites and psammites.

== Tayvallich Subgroup ==
The lithology of this subgroup varies across Scotland but is dominantly limestone though this is replaced in the east by psammite and quartzite. Lavas and pelites are seen around Tayvallich in Knapdale, after which area the subgroup is named, where it consists of the Tayvallich Slate and Limestone Formation and the overlying Tayvallich Volcanic Formation. The succession is between 100 and 250m thick but can reach up to 2.5 km in the east where the psammites and semipelites occur. The Loch Tay Limestone Formation extends from Campbeltown to Glen Isla.
