= Tomintoul =

Village in Banffshire

Tomintoul: Scottish Gaelic: Tom an t-Sabhail; Scots: Tamintowl
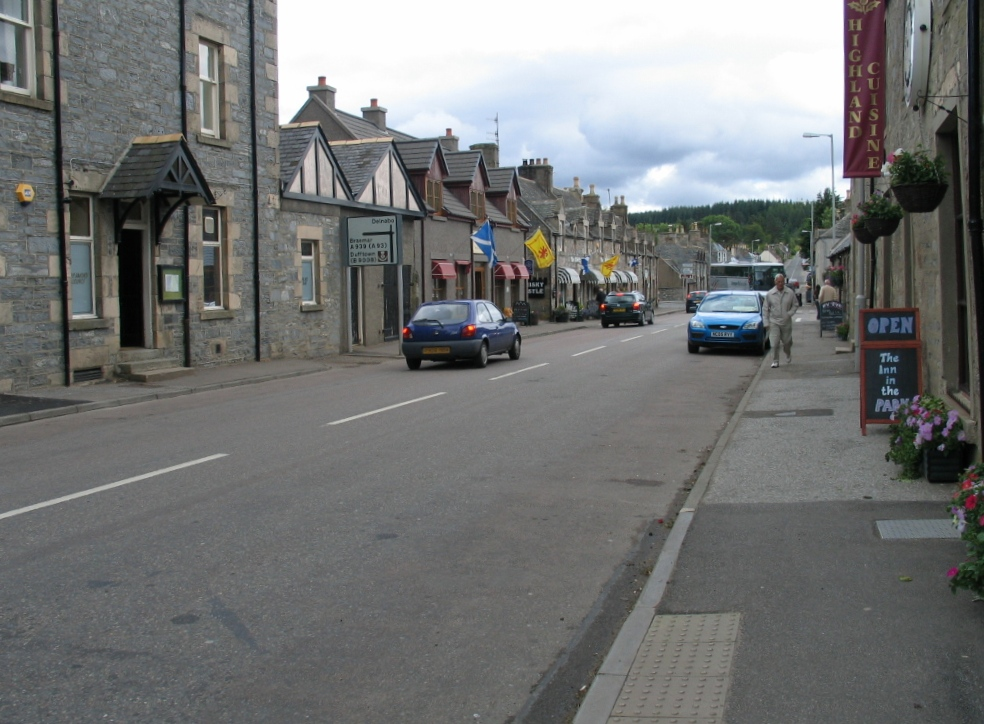

- Location within Moray
- Population: 716 (Census 2011)
- OS grid reference: NJ165185
  - Edinburgh: 125 mi (201 km)
  - London: 418 mi (673 km)
- Council area: Moray
- Lieutenancy area: Banffshire
- Country: Scotland
- Sovereign state: United Kingdom
- Post town: BALLINDALLOCH
- Postcode district: AB37
- Dialling code: 01807
- Police: Scotland
- Fire: Scottish
- Ambulance: Scottish
- UK Parliament: Moray West, Nairn and Strathspey
- Scottish Parliament: Moray

Tomintoul (/ˌtɒmɪnˈtaʊl/; from Scottish Gaelic: Tom an t-Sabhail, meaning "Hillock of the Barn") is a village in the Moray council area of Scotland in the historic county of Banffshire.

Within Cairngorms National Park, the village lies close to the banks of the River Avon and is said by some to be the highest village in the Scottish Highlands, although at 345 m (1,132 ft) it is still much lower than the highest village in Scotland (Wanlockhead, in Dumfries and Galloway at 466 m (1,529 ft)). By 1841, the parish reached a population of 1,722. In 1951, this had fallen to just 531. The 2011 census indicated a village population of 716 people. The village is historically part of the Parish of Kirkmichael.

The 2004 film One Last Chance, starring Kevin McKidd and Dougray Scott, was filmed in the village and the areas around it.

The village is on the famed Malt Whisky Trail, which also includes Dufftown, Keith, Tamnavulin, and Marypark. The surrounding countryside forms the Glenlivet Estate.

Tomintoul Golf Club, founded in 1897, disappeared at the time of World War II.

== History ==
The village was laid out on a grid pattern by Alexander Gordon, 4th Duke of Gordon in 1775. It followed the construction, 20 years previously, of a military road by William Caulfeild – now the A939. The duke's motivation for his efforts was the hope that a permanent settlement would minimise cattle theft and illegal distilling of spirits in the area. Estimates suggest that in the early 1700s there had been up to 200 illicit stills in the Livet glen, with spirits smuggled out over the Ladder hills.

In this "model village", he encouraged the production of linen but this plan was not successful; the locals stuck to subsistence agriculture, growing vegetables and raising cattle. A report in 1797 indicated that there were 37 families in the village "without any industry. All of them sell whisky and all of them drink it". In 1820, some 14,000 illegal stills were confiscated annually in the Livet glen area. The 1823 Excise Act allowed for making whisky under licence and some took advantage in order to make a legal profit. One of the first to do so was George Smith who started a distillery on his farm in the nearby village of Minmore. That small operation, founded in 1824, eventually grew to become The Glenlivet distillery in Upper Drumin (14 km (8.7 mi) from Tomintoul) which produces The Glenlivet single malt whisky, known around the world.

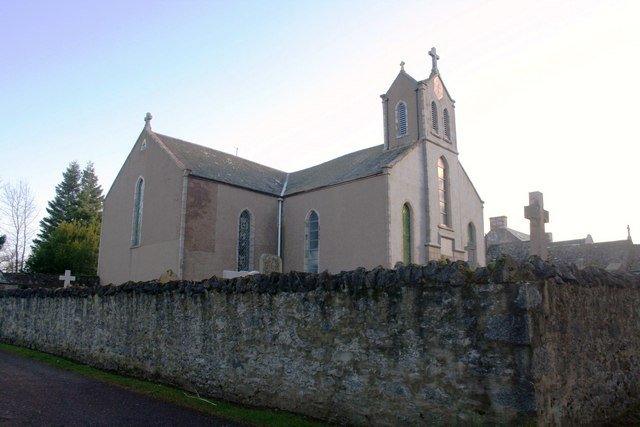
St Michael's RC Church, built 1837

In the Victorian era, the village was receiving some tourism; in 1860, there were three inns here. An 1857 Commercial Gazetteer described the community as a mean-looking village on a bleak moor with superstitious residents. The 1882–4 Frances Groome's Ordnance Gazetteer for Scotland also did not depict Tomintoul as a prosperous village:

"Consisting of a central square and a single street, running ¾ mile north-north-westward, it is described by the Queen, under date 5 Sept. 1860, as 'the most tumble-down, poor-looking place I ever saw-a long street with three inns, miserable dirty-looking houses and people, and a sad look of wretchedness about it'. ... Tomintoul has a post office with money order, savings' bank, and telegraph departments, a public and a Roman Catholic school, cattle fairs ... and hiring fairs ..."

Both churches, built prior to 1840, remain open in the village, Tomintoul Church and St Michael's. According to the above source, the population was as follows: 530 in 1839 and 686 by 1881.

== Regeneration efforts ==
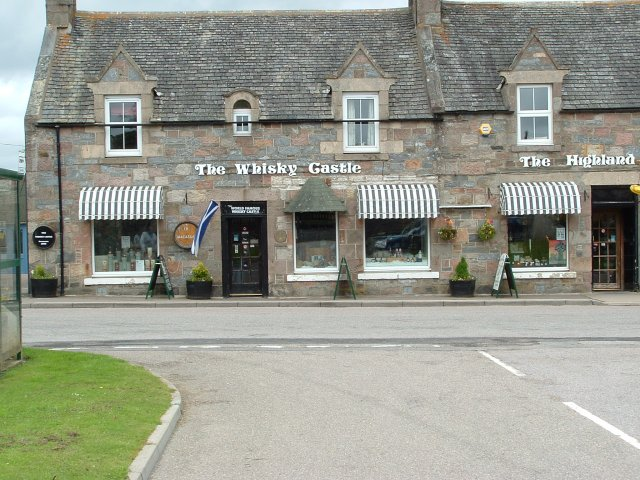
The Whisky Castle (2004)

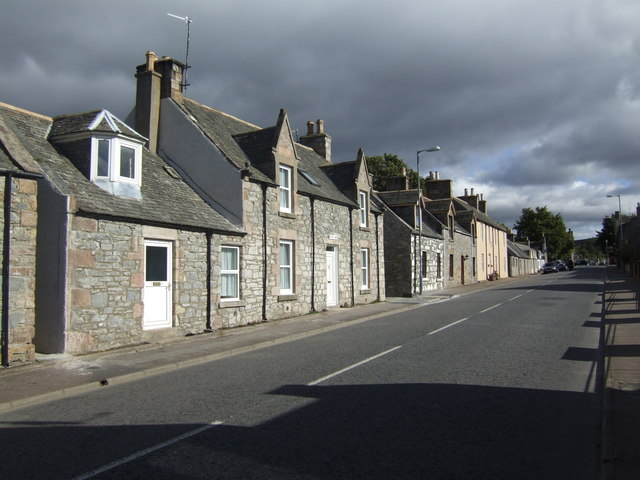
Main Street, Tomintoul (2007)

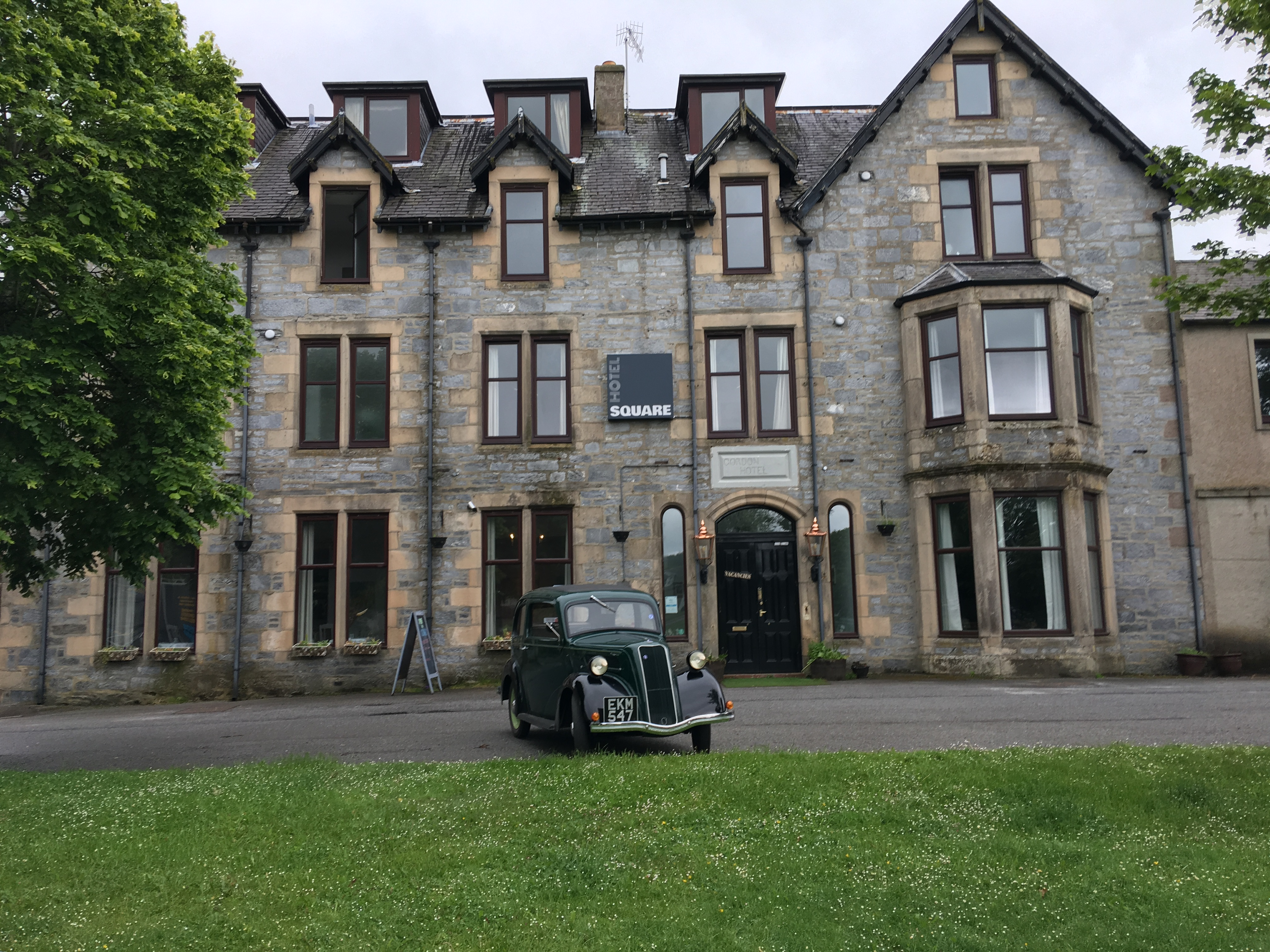
The Hotel Square

Queen Victoria's visit in 1860 helped boost tourism which still remains the primary economic activity. Marketing initiatives in the area today include SnowRoads and North East 250 scenic routes. Still billed as "the highest village in the Highlands", with a town square and Victorian buildings, Tomintoul offers tourists options such as snowsports in winter. Areas of interest in the vicinity include Glenlivet Estate (fishing as well as walking, cycling and horseback riding trails), north eastern Cairngorms and the (Speyside) Scotland's Malt Whisky Trail. The village also has a small museum, the Tomintoul & Glenlivet Discovery Centre, which focuses on life in the highlands through history.

The primary retailers for tourists include the Tomintoul Gallery that sells work created by local artists, the A'anside Studios that sell arts and crafts and the Whisky Castle, which offers hundreds of single malts. The castle has operated for over a century and offers whisky from every major distillery, as well as some rare products from distilleries no longer in operation. The Tomintoul Distillery, in nearby Ballindalloch, provides some employment; the company has been making whisky here for many decades. There is no visitor centre but some visits are allowed, by prior appointment.

The two main hotels in the village had closed by 2010, however. In an attempt to improve the economy, the area created the Regeneration Strategy and Action Plan in 2011, which led to the establishment of the Tomintoul and Glenlivet Development Trust in 2012. The group has taken several steps to "develop, inspire and embrace a vibrant future for the Tomintoul and Glenlivet area", seeking investment and promoting the area's visitor attractions. The regeneration effort obtained funding of approximately £3.5 million to be used for projects that would benefit the "cultural and natural landscape" of the area.

The village also made the Glenlivet Walking Festival an annual event as suggested by the 2012 Regeneration Strategy and Action Plan. In addition to tourism and the nearby whisky industry, sheep and beef cattle are raised on farms around the village.

Tomintoul is repeatedly mentioned in the mystery novel by Charles Exbrayat “On se reverra, petite” as the home of its fictional main character Malcolm McNamara.

== Notable people ==
Lynn Cassells and Sandra Baer farm the nearby Lynbreck Croft.

The immunologist Prof Kenneth Boyd Fraser FRSE retired to Tomintoul and died there.

The artist and writer Mary Barnes died in Tomintoul in 2001, after living there for some time.

"Mrs MacKay"

The late Terry Wogan helped bring the A939 road from Tomintoul to Cockbridge to national attention, along with local, fictional postmistress "Mrs MacKay". As reported in the daily newspaper The National:

In 1999, after he criticised the council for never being prepared for the snow, locals wrote in to say it was not the local authority that cleared the snow, but rather Mrs MacKay, the silver-haired postmistress and her silver-handled shovel. She was doing the best she could, they insisted. For the next decade listeners would phone in with sightings of the near mythical Mrs MacKay shovelling snow. Sometimes, they said, she would be out shovelling snow as early as June.

Lord Tony Williams

In the 1990s an individual, styled by the media as Lord Tony Williams, spent £1 million on improving the Gordon Arms Hotel (now Hotel Square) and invested money in other businesses. He was later shown to be a fraud who had stolen £4.5 million from his former employer, the Metropolitan Police and was sentenced to seven years in prison.

The author Captain W. E. Johns lived in the Richmond Hotel at Tomintoul from 1944 to 1947, before renting Pitchroy Lodge on the nearby Ballindalloch Estate from 1947 to 1953.

Percy Toplis - The "Monocled Mutineer"

Percy Toplis took refuge in the area in 1920 before being discovered by a local farmer. He made his escape, shooting and wounding the farmer and a police constable while doing so. Within a week, he was shot dead by police in England.

Grigor Willox

Grigor Willox was a reputed white witch who lived in Tomintoul in the 18th century. He was said to derive his powers from two amulets: a brass hook from a kelpie's bridle and a mermaid's crystal. Among his alleged powers were making cows produce milk, curing barren women, and detecting thieves.

== Climate ==
Tomintoul has an oceanic climate (Cfb), bordering on subpolar oceanic (Cfc). Since March 2025, Tomintoul has an official MetOffice weather station. Manual readings are sent to the Met-Office on a daily basis. The temperature values below are simulated and not taken from this weather station. Due to the villages' location northeast of the Cairngorms massif, it is exposed to many snow-bearing wind directions; this is consolidated by its elevation of 345m above sea level and its latitude at 57°N. As a result, Tomintoul is one of the coldest and snowiest settlements in the UK. The minimum temperature of −12.6 °C (9.3 °F) was registered on 21 November 2025 in Tomintoul.

Climate data for Tomintoul, United Kingdom
Month	Jan	Feb	Mar	Apr	May	Jun	Jul	Aug	Sep	Oct	Nov	Dec	Year
Mean daily maximum °C (°F)	4.4 (39.9)	4.7 (40.5)	6.6 (43.9)	9.3 (48.7)	12.4 (54.3)	14.9 (58.8)	17.1 (62.8)	16.6 (61.9)	14.0 (57.2)	10.4 (50.7)	6.9 (44.4)	4.6 (40.3)	10.2 (50.3)
Mean daily minimum °C (°F)	−1.4 (29.5)	−1.5 (29.3)	−0.2 (31.6)	1.3 (34.3)	3.7 (38.7)	6.7 (44.1)	8.9 (48.0)	8.5 (47.3)	6.4 (43.5)	3.7 (38.7)	0.9 (33.6)	−1.5 (29.3)	3.0 (37.3)
Average rainfall mm (inches)	123 (4.8)	91 (3.6)	91 (3.6)	65 (2.6)	69 (2.7)	69 (2.7)	74 (2.9)	80 (3.1)	89 (3.5)	122 (4.8)	111 (4.4)	103 (4.1)	1,087 (42.8)
Source: scottish-places.info
