= Phyllite =

Type of foliated metamorphic rock

Phyllite

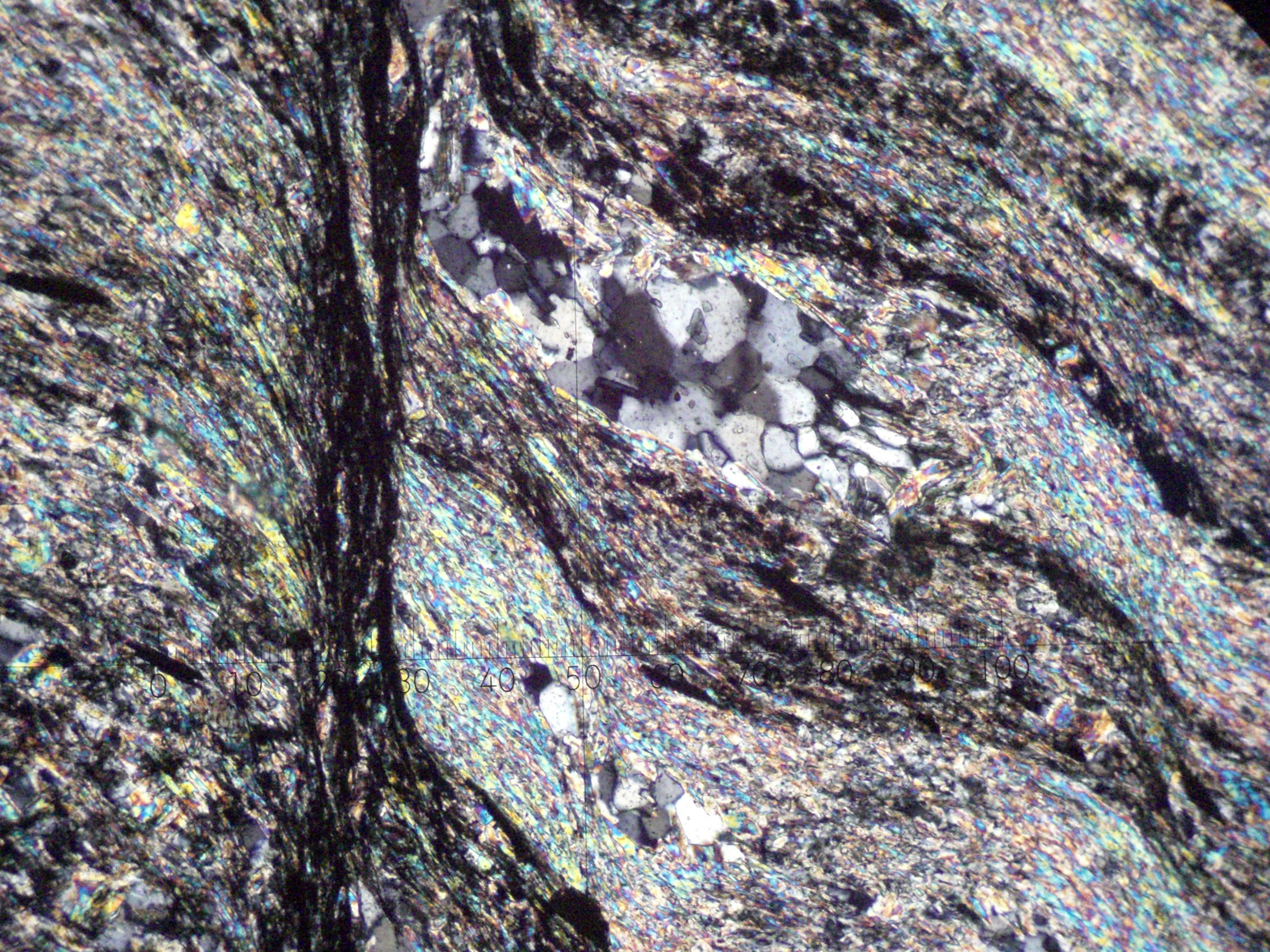
Photomicrograph of thin section of phyllite (in cross polarised light)

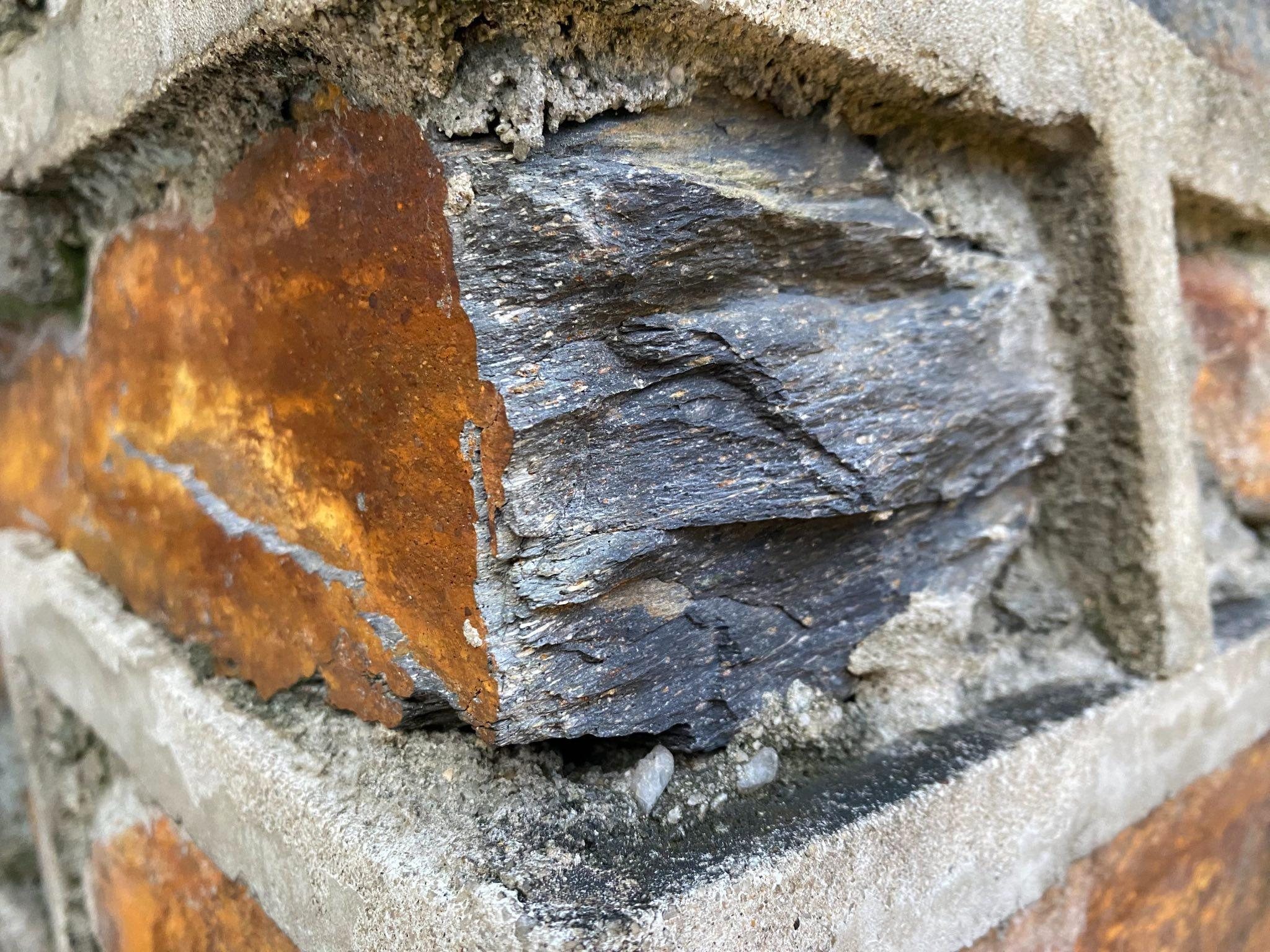
Fractured Duke stone showing phyllitic texture

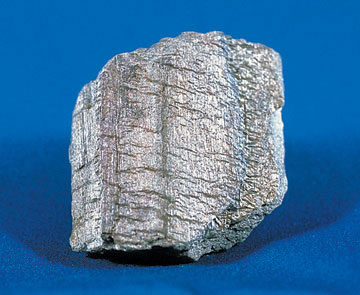
Phyllite

Phyllite (/ˈfɪlaɪt/ FIL-yte) is a type of foliated metamorphic rock formed from slate that is further metamorphosed so that very fine grained white mica achieves a preferred orientation. It is primarily composed of quartz, sericite mica, and chlorite.

Phyllite has fine-grained mica flakes, whereas slate has extremely fine mica flakes, and schist has large mica flakes, all mica flakes of which have achieved a preferred orientation. Among foliated metamorphic rocks, it represents a gradation in the degree of metamorphism between slate and schist.

The minute crystals of graphite, sericite, or chlorite, or the translucent fine-grained white mica, impart a silky, sometimes golden sheen to the surfaces of cleavage, called "phyllitic luster".

The word comes from the Greek phyllon, meaning "leaf".

The protolith (or parent rock) for phyllite is shale or pelite; or slate, which in turn came from a shale protolith. Its constituent platy minerals are larger than those in slate but are not visible with the naked eye. Phyllites are said to have a texture called "phyllitic sheen", and are usually classified as having formed through low-grade metamorphic conditions through regional metamorphism metamorphic facies.

Phyllite has good fissility (a tendency to split into sheets). Phyllites are usually black to gray or light greenish gray in color. The foliation is commonly crinkled or wavy in appearance. Phyllites are mostly used in decorative aggregates, interior decors, building stones, facing stones, garden decoration and curbing. Cemetery markers, commemorative tablets, creating artworks and writing slates are some of its commercial uses.

Phyllite is commonly found in the Dalradian metasediments of northwest Arran. In north Cornwall, there are Tredorn phyllites and Woolgarden phyllites.

Carolina "slate" is often volcanic phyllite. A type of Carolina slate, Duke stone, is a dacitic phyllite that is fractured and colored with iron oxide.
