= Appin Group =

- Stratigraphic range: Neoproterozoic
- Type: Group
- Unit of: Dalradian Supergroup
- Sub-units: Lochaber, Ballachulish and Blair Atholl subgroups
- Underlies: Argyll Group
- Overlies: Grampian Group
- Thickness: up to 4km

Lithology
- Primary: psammite
- Other: semipelite, quartzite, pelite, schist, limestone, slate

Location
- Region: Central Highlands

Type section
- Named for: Appin

The Appin Group is a thick sequence of metamorphosed Neoproterozoic sedimentary rocks that outcrop across the Central Highlands of Scotland, east of the Great Glen. It forms a part of the Dalradian Supergroup.

It is divided into three subgroups each consisting of multiple named formations. In stratigraphic order i.e. youngest at the top, these are:

Blair Atholl Subgroup

Islay Limestone Formation
Mullach Dubh Phyllites Formation
Lismore Limestone Formation
Cuil Bay Slates Formation

Ballachulish Subgroup

Appin Phyllite & Limestone Formation
Appin Quartzite Formation
Ballachulish Slate Formation
Ballachulish Limestone Formation

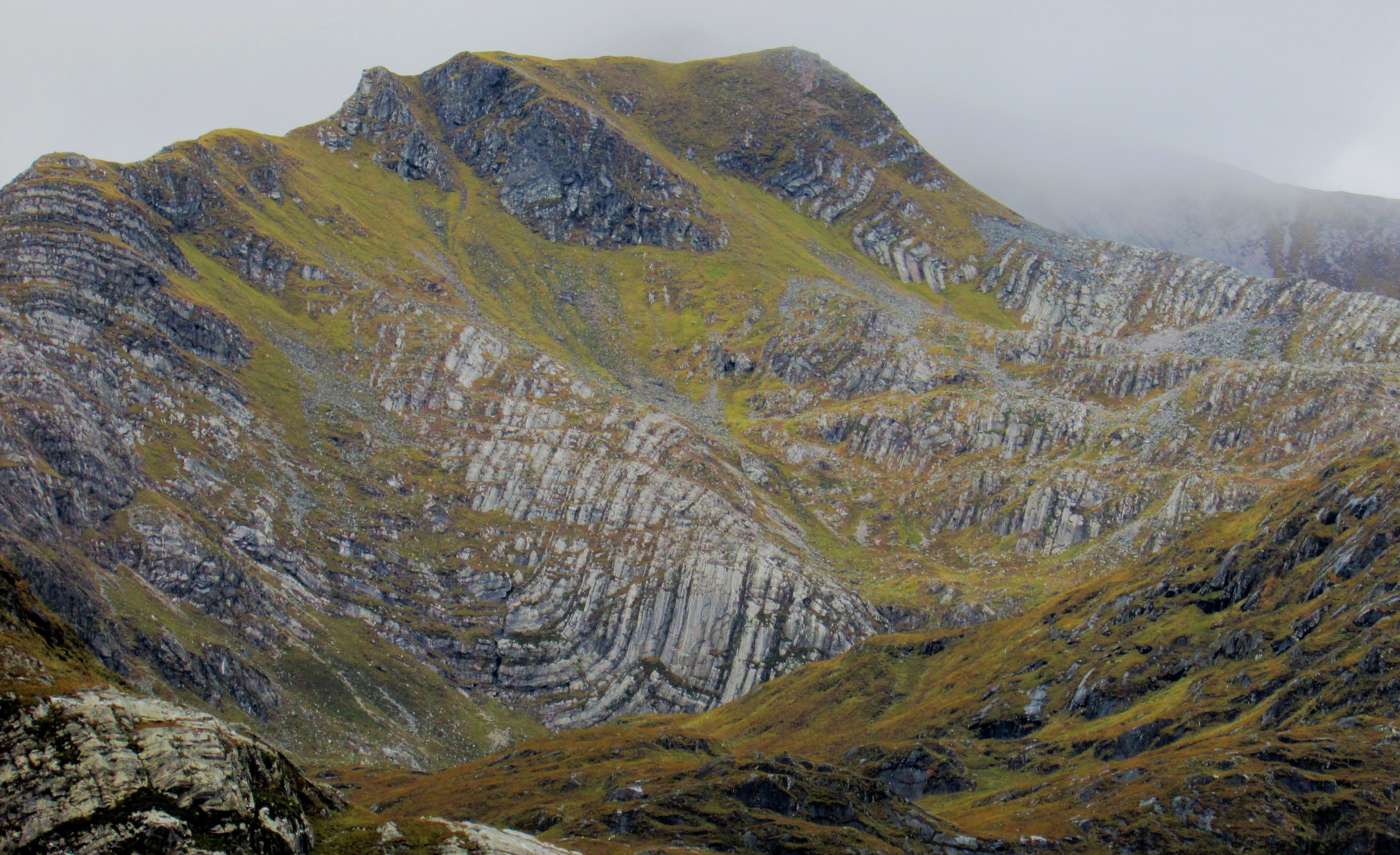
Folded metamorphic rocks of the Lochaber Subgroup in Glen Nevis

Lochaber Subgroup

Leven Schist Formation
Glencoe Quartzite Formation
Binnein Schist Formation
Binnein Quartzite Formation
Eilde Schist Formation
Eilde Quartzite Formation

This whole succession reflects alternate periods of deepening and filling of the sedimentary basin.
