= Highland Border Complex =

Rocks in Scotland

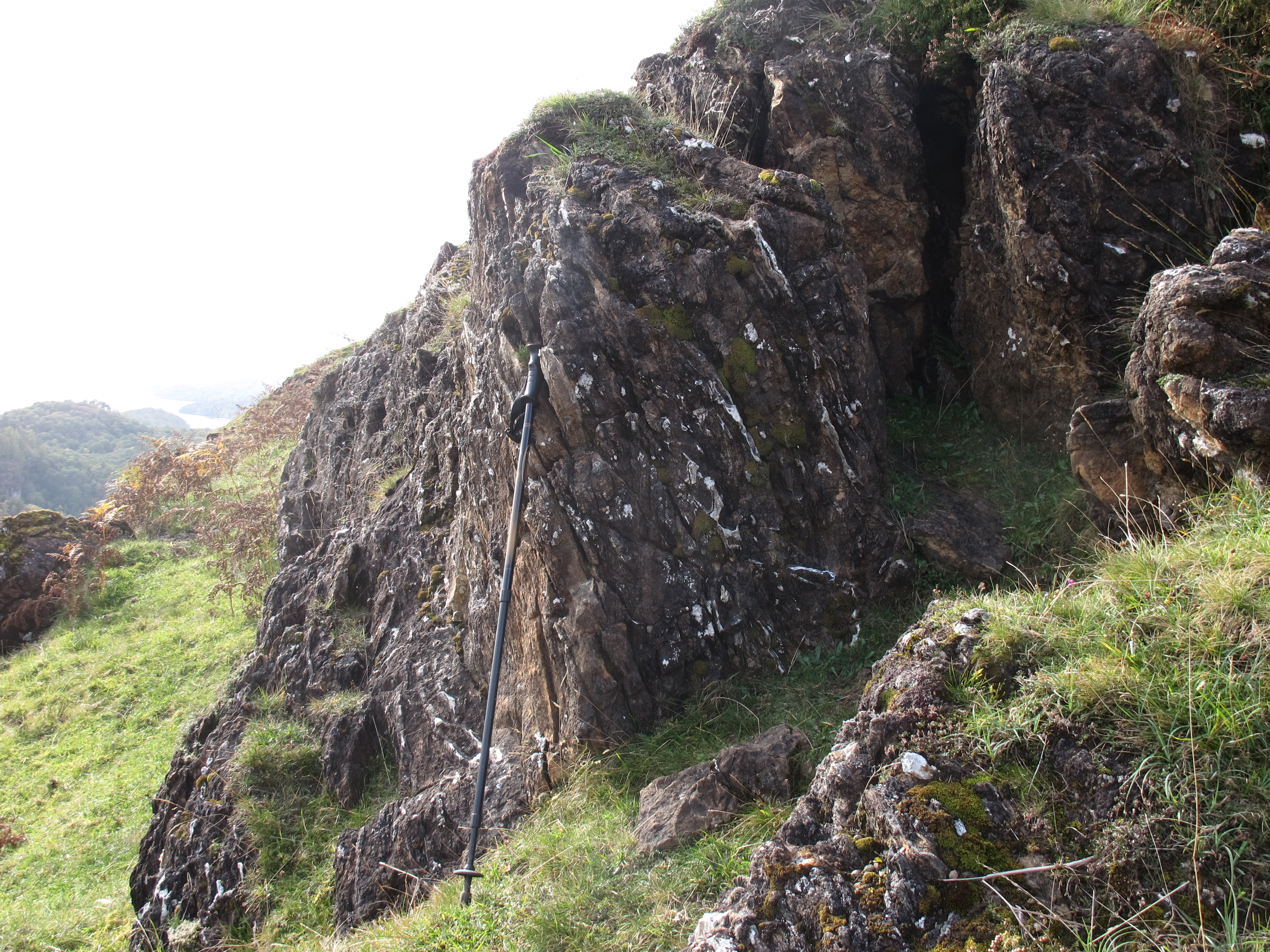
Altered serpentinite and associated sediments of the Highland Border Complex caught up in the Highland Boundary Fault – exposed on Druim nam Buraich, near Balmaha

The Highland Border Complex is an assemblage of rocks of probable early Cambrian to late Ordovician age, found as fault-bounded blocks of variable lithology exposed immediately to the southeast of the Highland Boundary Fault at the edge of the Grampian Highlands, Scotland.

== Extent ==
Rocks of the Highland Border Complex are exposed intermittently along the trace of the Highland Boundary Fault for about 250 km from Glen Sannox on the Isle of Arran in the southwest to Garron Point near Stonehaven in the northeast. The exposed width varies along the outcrop but is always less than 1,300 m.

It has been suggested that the complex directly correlates with the Clew Bay Complex in Ireland, which is probably of similar age and is also associated with a proposed continuation of the Highland Boundary Fault.

== Stratigraphy ==
At least four rock assemblages have been recognised within the Highland Border Complex: gritty sandstone with limestone and mudstone (probably lowermost Upper Ordovician); metabasalt, chert and mudstone equivalents; limestone and serpentinite conglomerate (uppermost Lower Ordovician); serpentinite, metagabbro and hornblende-schist. Their relationship with the lower Cambrian Leny Limestone and associated black shales remains debated.

== Interpretation ==
Most of the sedimentary rocks of the Highland Border Complex have been interpreted as being in stratigraphic continuity with the Dalradian Supergroup, with the ophiolitic rocks (serpentinite, metagabbro, hornblende schist, metabasalt, chert and black slates, collectively known as the Highland Border Ophiolite), emplaced on them during the Grampian Orogeny. Alternatively, the complex is viewed as a tectonically emplaced sequence that is unrelated to the Dalradian.
