= Dalradian =

Sequence of rock strata in Scotland and Ireland

Dalradian Supergroup
- Stratigraphic range: 725–470 Ma
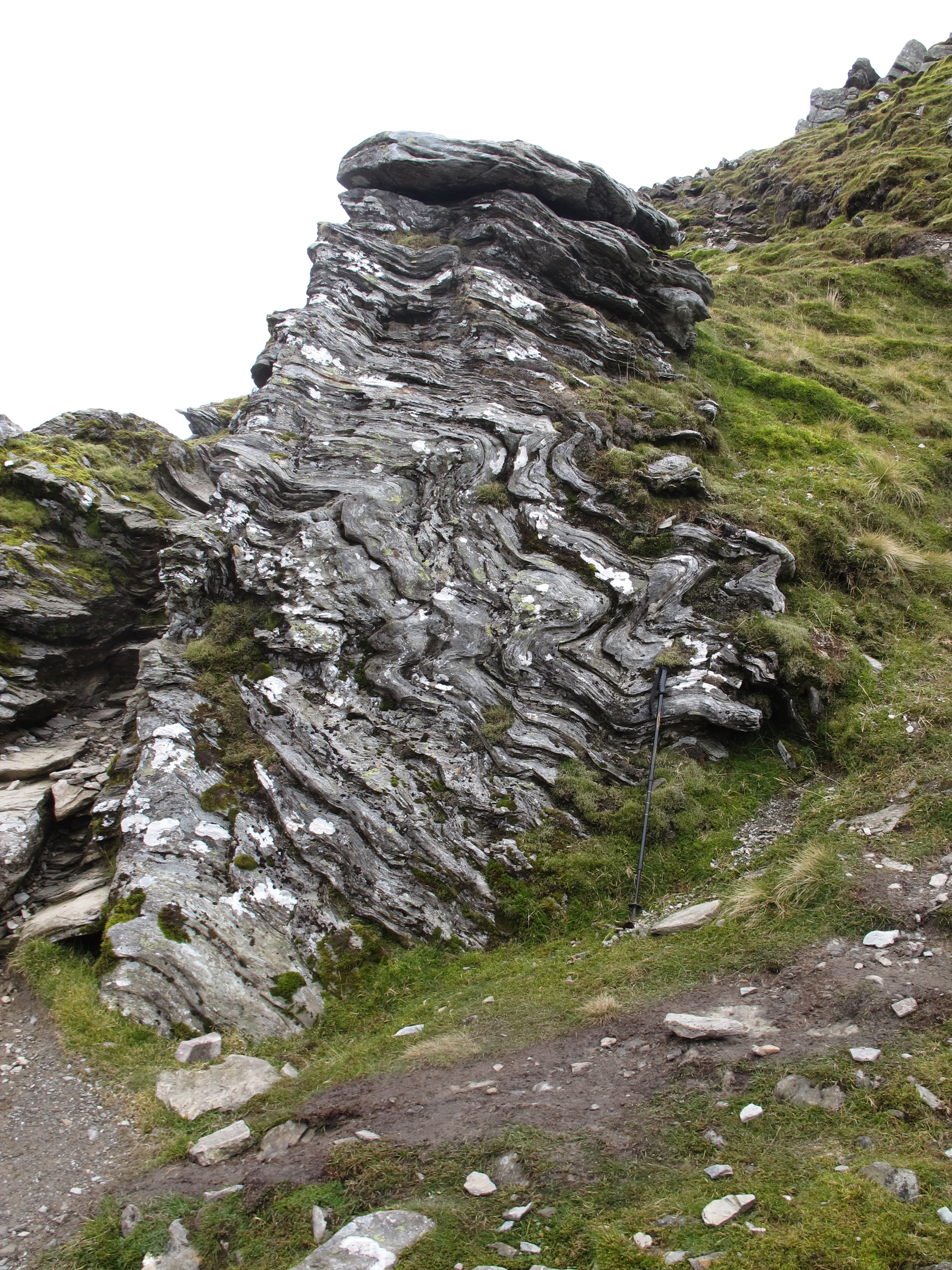
- Folded Dalradian phyllites of the Ediacaran to lower Cambrian Ben Ledi Grit Formation, part of the Southern Highland Group
- Type: Geological supergroup
- Sub-units: Grampian Group, Appin Group, Argyll Group, Southern Highland Group, Trossachs Group
- Underlies: Old Red Sandstone, Highland Border Ophiolite (tectonic contact)
- Overlies: Loch Ness Supergroup
- Thickness: >20 km (summing the individual groups)

Lithology
- Primary: Psammite, quartzite, semipelite, pelite, limestone
- Other: diamictite

Location
- Region: Grampian Highlands, Shetland, County Antrim, County Tyrone, County Londonderry, Northern and Western Region
- Country: Scotland, Northern Ireland, Republic of Ireland

Type section
- Named for: Dál Riata (Dalriada)

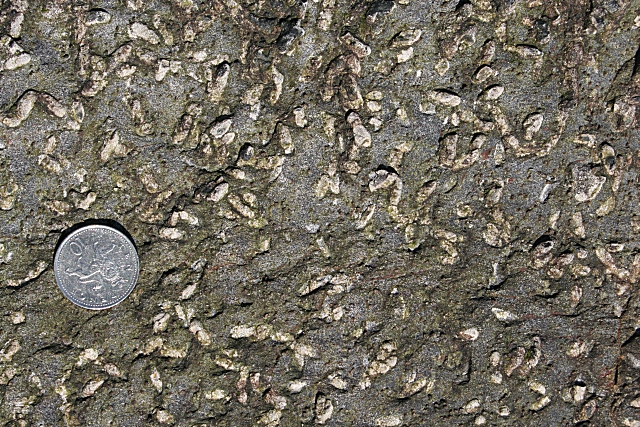
Andalusite crystals in Dalradian (Southern Highland Group) metamorphic rock at Boyndie Bay, north-east Scotland

The Dalradian Supergroup (informally and traditionally the Dalradian) is a stratigraphic unit (a sequence of rock strata) in the lithostratigraphy of the Grampian Highlands of Scotland and in the north and west of Ireland. The diverse assemblage of rocks which constitute the supergroup extend across Scotland from Islay in the west to Fraserburgh in the east and are confined by the Great Glen Fault to the northwest and the Highland Boundary Fault to the southeast. Much of Shetland east of the Walls Boundary Fault is also formed from Dalradian rocks. Dalradian rocks extend across the north of Ireland from County Antrim in the north east to Clifden on the Atlantic coast, although obscured by younger Palaeogene lavas and tuffs or Carboniferous rocks in large sections.

== Historical ==
The land to the southeast of the Great Glen was the old Celtic region of Dál Riata (Dalriada), and in 1891 Archibald Geikie proposed the name Dalradian as a convenient provisional designation for the complicated set of rocks to which it was then difficult to assign a definite position in the stratigraphical sequence.

In Archibald Geikie's words, "they consist in large proportion of altered sedimentary strata, now found in the form of mica-schist, graphite-schist, andalusite-schist, phyllite, schistose grit, greywacke and conglomerate, quartzite, limestone and other rocks, together with epidiorites, chlorite-schists, hornblende schists and other allied varieties, which probably mark sills, lava-sheets or beds of tuff, intercalated among the sediments. The total thickness of this assemblage of rocks must be many thousand feet." The Dalradian Series (as then defined) included the "Eastern or Younger schists" of eastern Sutherland, Ross-shire and Inverness-shire, the Moine gneiss, as well as the metamorphosed igneous and sedimentary rocks of the central, eastern and southwestern Scottish Highlands.

== Age ==
The Dalradian Supergroup spans the late Tonian through to early Ordovician, however, there is an unfortunate lack of direct geochronological age constraints throughout the succession. There is some debate as to the age of the base of the Dalradian with some suggesting that sedimentation must be younger than ca. 806 Ma, which dates the deformation of the underlying basement Badenoch Group. However, the relationship between the Badenoch Group and the lowermost Dalradian is unclear. A definitive depositional age of 601 ± 4 Ma is derived from the Tayvallich Volcanic Formation at the top of the Argyll Group and provides a useful age constrain for the uppermost Dalradian. A detrital zircon study provides useful maximum depositional age constraints for the lowermost Argyll group 1.1 km thick glaciogenic Port Askaig Formation. The age constraints suggest that the Port Askaig Formation correlates with the global ‘Sturtian’ Snowball Earth interval and spans ca. 717 – 660 Ma. At present, no conclusive ‘Marinoan’ aged glacial deposit has been found.

== Sub-units ==
The supergroup is composed of four groups which in stratigraphic order i.e. youngest at top, are:

- Southern Highland Group
- Argyll Group
- Appin Group
- Grampian Group

The upper three groups are applied to Ireland too; the Grampian Group is not recorded here nor in Shetland where the Dalradian is divided into a Clift Hills ‘Division’ which equates to the Southern Highland Group, a Whiteness ‘Division’ which equates to the Argyll Group and a Scatsta ‘Division’ which equates to the Appin Group. Though now metamorphosed, the Dalradian sequence was originally deposited as marine sands and muds, silt and limestone. Metamorphism has been low to medium grade for the most part and resulted in the formation of slates, phyllites, psammites, pelites and semipelites. The Tayvallich Subgroup contains volcanics within a turbidite basin and there are lavas within the overlying Southern Highland Group.

An additional group is recognised by some workers, the Trossachs Group, forming the uppermost part of the succession, which outcrops close to the Highland Boundary Fault.

=== Trossachs Group ===
The Trossachs Group as defined lies conformably above rocks of the Southern Highlands Group just northwest of the Highland Boundary Fault. Most of the outcrops of the Trossachs Group are fault-bounded, making overall correlation difficult. The oldest part of the group is interpreted to be the Keltie Water Formation, which includes the Leny Limestone and Slate Member from which lower Cambrian trilobite fossils have been recovered. Apparently higher in the succession is the Margie Formation, which includes the Margie Limestone Member, which has yielded conodont fossils of early Ordovician age. Rocks of this group are interpreted to be everywhere in tectonic contact structurally below the Highland Border Ophiolite. The sedimentary rocks that lie unconformably above the ophiolite include the Dounans Limestone Formation that contains a fossil fauna of mid-Arenig age (near the boundary between the lower and middle Ordovician).

=== Southern Highland Group ===
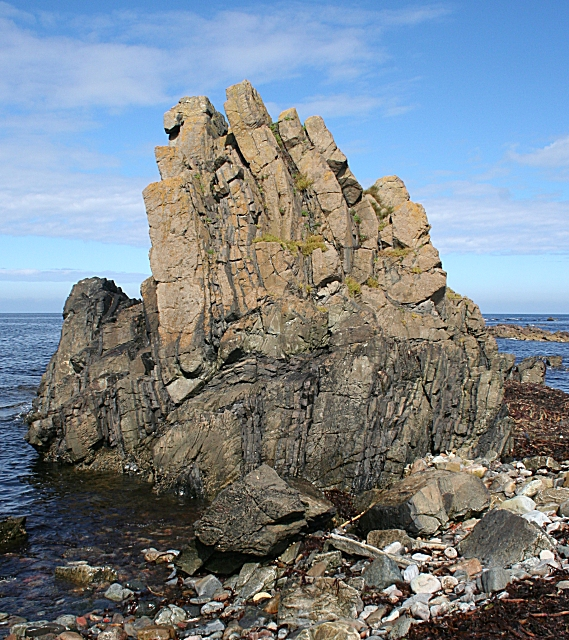
Folded rocks of the Southern Highland Group at Whitehills

The Southern Highland Group is found along the entire southeastern margin of the Grampian Highlands from Kintyre to Stonehaven and also in the northeast along the coastal strip between Fraserburgh and Portsoy, extending south to the Don valley. In Shetland, the Clift Hills Division extends from north of Lerwick south to Fitful Head. In Ireland the most extensive outcrop of the Southern Highland Group is to the north and south of Lough Foyle and west to Lough Swilly. Smaller exposures occur as far to the southwest as Inishbofin, County Galway.

=== Argyll and Appin groups ===
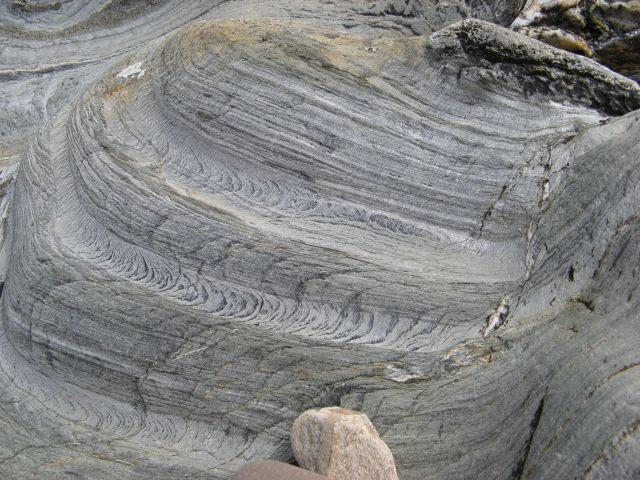
Dalradian metasediments of the Easdale Subgroup of the Argyll Group near Ormsary

In mainland Scotland, the Appin and Argyll group sequences occupy the intermediate ground between the Southern Highland and Grampian groups. The Argyll Group is divided into four subgroups, thus:

- Tayvallich Subgroup
- Crinan Subgroup
- Easdale Subgroup
- Islay Subgroup

whilst the Appin Group is divided into three subgroups:

- Blair Atholl Subgroup
- Ballachulish Subgroup
- Lochaber Subgroup

In Shetland the Whiteness ‘Division’ forms the core of Mainland whilst the Scatsta ‘Division’ forms the western halves of Unst and Fetlar, all of Whalsay and much of the southeastern part of Mainland, east of the Nesting Fault. These rocks are also present in Ireland across County Londonderry and County Donegal and appear again in the Ox Mountains, the Nephin Beg Range and the Twelve Pins of Connemara.

=== Grampian Group ===
The Grampian Group rocks occupy the ground south west from Elgin and extending down the Great Glen as far as Corran on Loch Linnhe and, further east, as far south as Tyndrum. It is divided into three subgroups:

- Glen Spean Subgroup
- Corrieyairack Subgroup
- Glenshirra Subgroup

=== Shetland sequence ===
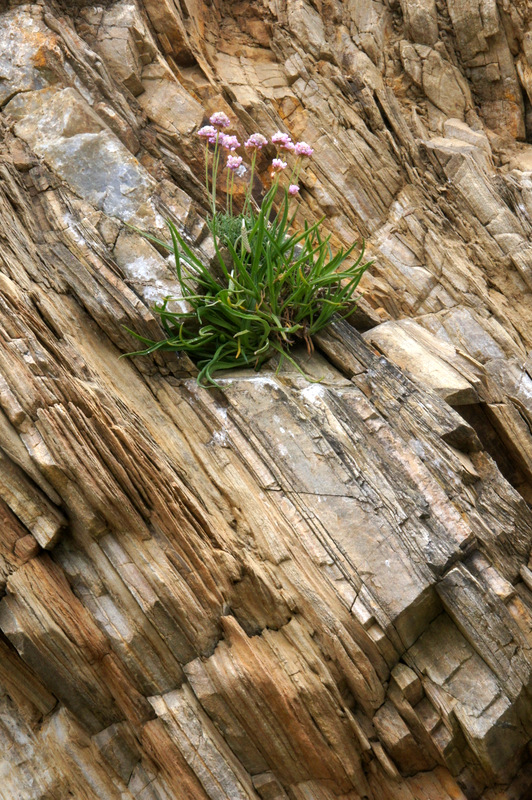
Dalradian tilted metasedimentary rocks of the Hevda Phyllite Formation at Skaw, on Unst, Shetland

The stratigraphic position of the sequence identified as Dalradian in the Shetland Islands is uncertain, because the main marker within the sequence in Scotland and Ireland, the Port Askaig Tillite Formation (of the Islay Subgroup), is not present. Carbon isotope data from four metamorphosed limestones within this mainly siliclastic sequence, suggest that the entire Shetland sequence probably lies stratigraphically above the tillite marker, explaining its absence.

== Structure ==
The Grampian orogeny folded the sequence in mainland Scotland into a series of major tight folds with NE-SW aligned fold axes. Much of the southeastern part of the outcrop forms a part of the Tay Nappe and involves the inversion of a large part of the succession. Caledonoid faulting on NE-SW lines affects the sequence across the entire area.
