= Southern Highland Group =

- Stratigraphic range: Neoproterozoic
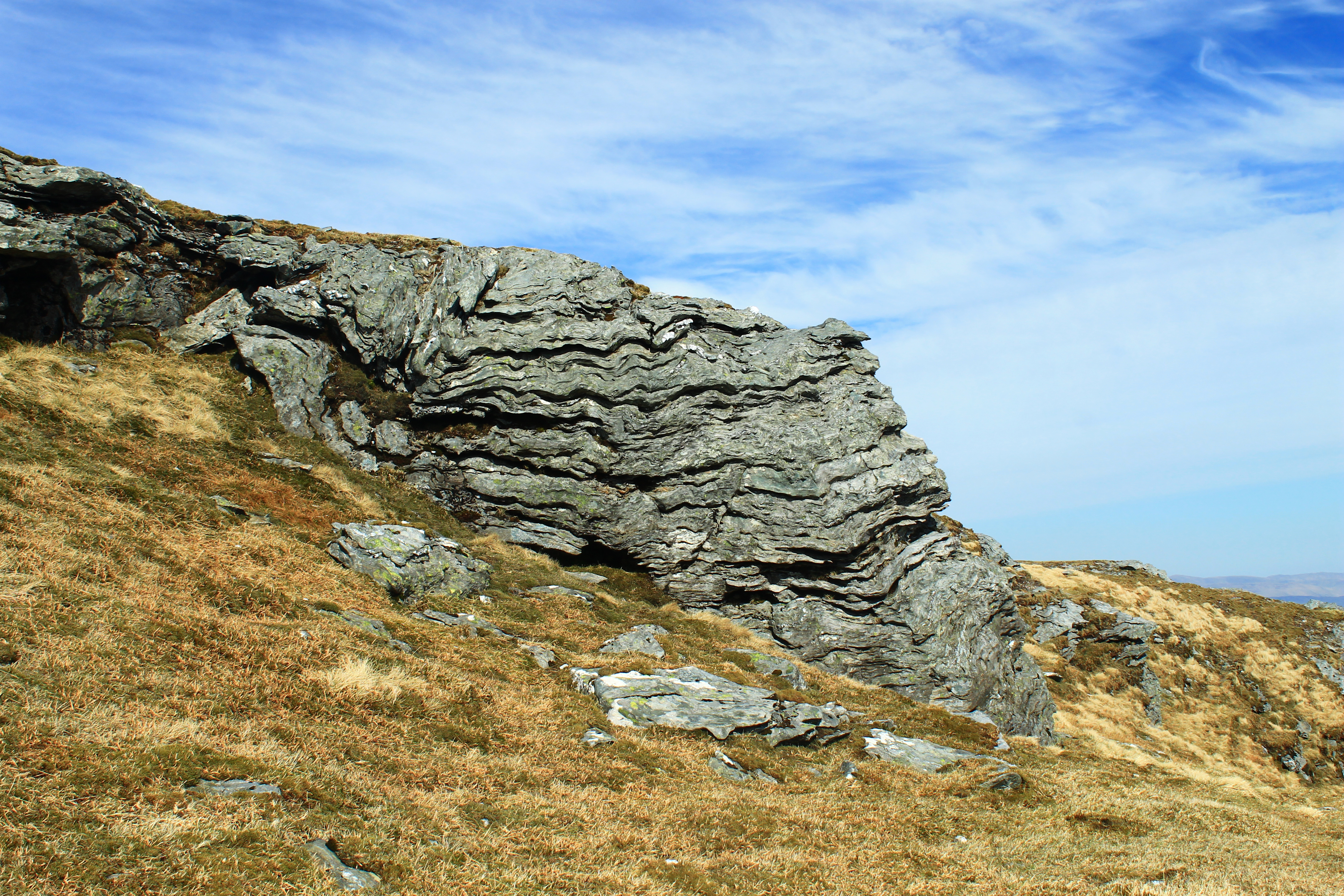
- Folded schist of the Beinn Bheula Schist Formation, which is part of the Southern Highland Group, at Ben Vane
- Type: Group
- Unit of: Dalradian Supergroup
- Sub-units: North Sannox Grits Formation
- Underlies: ?Ordovician rocks
- Overlies: Tayvallich Subgroup of Argyll Group

Lithology
- Primary: psammite
- Other: pelite, greywacke, volcanic rocks

Location
- Region: Grampian Mountains

Type section
- Named for: Southern Highlands

The Southern Highland Group is a sequence of metamorphosed Neoproterozoic sedimentary rocks that outcrop across the Central Highlands of Scotland, east of the Great Glen. It forms the uppermost/youngest part of the Dalradian Supergroup and is divided into two formations. Volcanism is recorded by the Loch Avich Lavas Formation which divides the Loch Avich Grits Formation into lower and upper parts – the grits are turbidite and submarine fan deposits. In Perthshire and on Deeside, the Leny Limestone, which has been dated to 514 Ma, is present. A tillite, the Macduff Boulder Bed is known from the upper part of the group in northeast Scotland.
