= List of listed buildings in Kiltarlity and Convinth =

This is a list of listed buildings in the parish of Kiltarlity and Convinth in the Highland council area of Scotland. This includes the villages of Kiltarlity, Struy and Tomich, as well as the surrounding areas of Glen Convinth and Strathglass.

== List ==
Name	Location	Date Listed	Grid Ref. (Note: Sometimes known as OSGB36, the grid reference (where provided) is based on the British national grid reference system used by the Ordnance Survey. • "Guide to National Grid". Ordnance Survey. • "Get-a-map". Ordnance Survey.)	Geo-coordinates	Notes	LB Number (Note: Historic Environment Scotland assign a unique alphanumeric identifier to each designated site in Scotland, for listed buildings this always begins with "LB", for example "LB12345".)	Image
Tomich Hotel, Post Office and Former Stables	Tomich			57°18′19″N 4°48′42″W	Category C(S)	8120	Upload another image
East Lodge and Gate Piers, Beaufort Castle	Beaufort			57°27′24″N 4°27′58″W	Category B	8069	Upload Photo
West Lodge, Beaufort Castle	Beaufort			57°26′43″N 4°30′26″W	Category C(S)	8070	Upload Photo
Beaufort Cottage Gardener's Cottage	Beaufort			57°26′52″N 4°29′50″W	Category B	8071	Upload Photo
Belladrum Temple	Belladrum			57°26′26″N 4°27′59″W	Category B	8075	Upload another image
Lovat Bridge Over River Beauly	River Beauly			57°28′14″N 4°28′33″W	Category A	8083	Upload another image See more images
1,2,3,4,5,6, Belladrum Farm Cottages	Belladrum			57°26′20″N 4°27′58″W	Category B	8096	Upload Photo
St Mary's Roman Catholic Church and Burial Ground	Eskadale			57°25′24″N 4°34′34″W	Category B	8105	Upload Photo
Achanagleish Cottage, Guisachan	By Tomich			57°17′17″N 4°50′15″W	Category C(S)	8106	Upload Photo
Guisachan Cottage	Tomich			57°18′04″N 4°49′12″W	Category B	8111	Upload Photo
1, 2, 3, Tomich "Ardastur"	Tomich			57°18′13″N 4°48′54″W	Category C(S)	8113	Upload Photo
8, 9 Tomich	Tomich			57°18′15″N 4°48′49″W	Category B	8116	Upload Photo
Entrance to Guisachan Farm with Gate Piers and Gates	Tomich			57°18′17″N 4°48′45″W	Category C(S)	8122	Upload Photo
Beaufort Castle	Beaufort			57°27′10″N 4°29′25″W	Category A	8068	Upload another image See more images
Beaufort Castle Walled Garden	Beaufort			57°26′48″N 4°29′46″W	Category B	8072	Upload Photo
Former Stables And Steading Range, Phoineas	Belladrum			57°27′15″N 4°27′34″W	Category C(S)	8085	Upload Photo
16, 17, 18, Tomich	Tomich			57°18′20″N 4°48′37″W	Category C(S)	8087	Upload Photo
Pair Cottages to Rear of Steading Square, Guisachan Farm, By Tomich	Tomich			57°18′07″N 4°48′47″W	Category C(S)	8092	Upload Photo
Walled Garden and Gardener's Cottage, Belladrum	Belladrum			57°26′24″N 4°27′58″W	Category B	8094	Upload Photo
Belladrum Lodge	Belladrum			57°27′01″N 4°28′04″W	Category B	8098	Upload Photo
12, 13 Tomich	Tomich			57°18′18″N 4°48′46″W	Category C(S)	8118	Upload Photo
22, 23, 24, Tomich	Tomich			57°18′23″N 4°48′29″W	Category C(S)	8089	Upload Photo
Erchless Castle	By Struy			57°25′47″N 4°38′58″W	Category B	8100	Upload another image
Knockfin Bridge Over River Deabhag	Tomich			57°18′04″N 4°49′15″W	Category B	8109	Upload Photo
Tomich, Corrie Lodge (Comprising East Wing, Corrie Lodge and West Wing)	Tomich			57°18′05″N 4°49′09″W	Category C(S)	8112	Upload Photo
6, 7 Tomich	Tomich			57°18′15″N 4°48′51″W	Category C(S)	8115	Upload Photo
10, 11 Tomich	Tomich			57°18′16″N 4°48′48″W	Category C(S)	8117	Upload Photo
Beaufort Castle, The Coach House, Including Ancillary Structure	Beaufort			57°27′15″N 4°29′47″W	Category C(S)	47970	Upload Photo
14, Tomich, Gate House	Tomich			57°18′17″N 4°48′44″W	Category B	8123	Upload Photo
15 Tomich	Tomich			57°18′17″N 4°48′43″W	Category C(S)	8124	Upload Photo
Free Church Manse	Kiltarlity			57°25′53″N 4°29′04″W	Category B	8079	Upload Photo
The Old Manse, (Formerly Rivendell)	Kiltarlity			57°26′23″N 4°29′16″W	Category B	8082	Upload Photo
Struy Bridge Over River Farrar	Struy			57°25′32″N 4°39′48″W	Category B	8086	Upload Photo
Guisachan Farm Steading	By Tomich			57°18′04″N 4°48′49″W	Category B	8091	Upload Photo
4, 5 Tomich	Tomich			57°18′14″N 4°48′52″W	Category B	8114	Upload Photo
Belladrum Gazebo	Belladrum			57°26′59″N 4°27′38″W	Category B	8074	Upload Photo
Chapel House, St Mary's Church	Eskadale			57°25′25″N 4°34′34″W	Category C(S)	8077	Upload Photo
Kiltarlity Parish Church Of Scotland and Burial Ground, Tomnacross	Kiltarlity			57°26′18″N 4°28′46″W	Category B	8078	Upload Photo
Guisachan Farm House	By Tomich			57°18′08″N 4°48′48″W	Category C(S)	8090	Upload Photo
Belladrum Steading	Belladrum			57°26′21″N 4°28′00″W	Category B	8095	Upload Photo
Belladrum Farm Henhouse	Belladrum			57°26′18″N 4°27′59″W	Category C(S)	8097	Upload Photo
Eskadale House	Eskdale			57°26′05″N 4°33′23″W	Category B	8104	Upload Photo
Former Stables, Guisachan	Tomich			57°16′59″N 4°50′55″W	Category B	8125	Upload Photo
Beaufort Home Farm Steading	Beaufort			57°26′42″N 4°30′08″W	Category B	8073	Upload Photo
Kiltarlity Free Church of Scotland	Kiltarlity			57°26′10″N 4°29′23″W	Category B	8080	Upload Photo
Kiltarlity Old Parish Church and Burial Ground	By River Beauly			57°27′38″N 4°30′23″W	Category B	8081	Upload Photo
19, 20, 21, Tomich	Tomich			57°18′21″N 4°48′33″W	Category C(S)	8088	Upload Photo
Convinth Burial Ground	Glen Convinth			57°24′11″N 4°28′41″W	Category C(S)	8099	Upload Photo
Erchless Castle Walled Garden	By Struy			57°25′49″N 4°39′06″W	Category B	8102	Upload Photo
Plodda Cottage, Guisachan	By Tomich			57°16′46″N 4°51′21″W	Category C(S)	8107	Upload Photo
East Lodge to Former Guisachan House	Tomich			57°18′02″N 4°49′07″W	Category B	8110	Upload Photo
Tweedmouth Memorial Fountain	Tomich			57°18′14″N 4°48′50″W	Category B	8121	Upload another image
Stables at St Mary's Church	Eskadale			57°25′23″N 4°34′40″W	Category B	8076	Upload Photo
Guisachan Farm Dairy	By Tomich			57°18′07″N 4°48′50″W	Category B	8093	Upload Photo
Erchless Castle Stable/Steading	By Struy			57°25′51″N 4°39′01″W	Category B	8101	Upload Photo
Erchless Castle Burial Ground	By Struy			57°25′56″N 4°38′57″W	Category C(S)	8103	Upload Photo
Former Erchless Church Of Scotland Manse, Struy	By Struy			57°25′46″N 4°39′28″W	Category B	8108	Upload Photo
"Mealbane", Tomich	Tomich			57°18′18″N 4°48′44″W	Category C(S)	8119	Upload Photo
Phoineas House	Belladrum			57°27′06″N 4°27′37″W	Category B	8084	Upload Photo

== Key ==
The scheme for classifying buildings in Scotland is:

- Category A: "buildings of national or international importance, either architectural or historic; or fine, little-altered examples of some particular period, style or building type."
- Category B: "buildings of regional or more than local importance; or major examples of some particular period, style or building type, which may have been altered."
- Category C: "buildings of local importance; lesser examples of any period, style, or building type, as originally constructed or moderately altered; and simple traditional buildings which group well with other listed buildings."

In March 2016 there were 47,288 listed buildings in Scotland. Of these, 8% were Category A, and 50% were Category B, with the remaining 42% being Category C.

== See also ==
- List of listed buildings in Highland
