= John Farquharson (Jesuit) =

Scottish Jesuit priest and folk hero

John Farquharson (Scottish Gaelic: Maighstir Iain, an-tAthair Iain Mac Fhearchair) (19 April 1699 – 13 October 1782), was a member of the Scottish nobility who became a priest in the Northwest Highlands for the illegal Catholic Church in Scotland.

John Farquharson was born in the valley of Braemar as the son of the chief of Clan Farquharson and laird of Inverey and Auchindryne. After studying at the Scots College, Douai and being ordained as a Roman Catholic priest, Farquharson returned to Scotland. He lived in a cave with two fellow Jesuits as outlawed "heather priests" and underground missionaries to Clan Chisholm and Clan Fraser of Lovat in and around Strathglass during the era of the Penal Laws. After a government crackdown, with the collusion of both Chisholm of Chisholm and Lord Lovat, Farquharson composed a work of satirical poetry denouncing Lord Lovat for being unfaithful to the Holy See, as "a traitor to both kings", and the religious persecution of the many Catholics of Clan Fraser, predicting that Lord Lovat's body would soon be without his head.

Despite not having played a role in the Jacobite rising of 1745, during the Hanoverian crackdown following the Battle of Culloden in 1746, Farquharson surrendered to Major James Lockhart. Following imprisonment, Farquharson was expelled from the British Isles and ordered never to return. He returned to Scotland almost immediately, however, and went back to his former missionary apostolate in Strathglass, where he remained until being appointed prefect of studies at the Scots College in Douai in 1753. Following the suppression of the Jesuits, he returned to Scotland and worked as a resident chaplain and tutor to his nephew. He died at Balmoral Castle, then the property of the chiefs of Clan Farquharson, in 1782.

Farquharson was also a folklorist and Celticist, a collector of oral poetry from the Fenian Cycle of Celtic mythology, and of local Scottish Gaelic literature. His lost manuscripts played a role in the later Ossianic controversy. During the Victorian era, the lost folklore collection of John Farquharson served as an inspiration to former British Army officer and folklorist Colin Chisholm of Lietry. Lietry sought to collect and publish as much of the local oral tradition as he could salvage, both from local informants and from his many correspondents throughout the global Scottish diaspora. Along with his brother, Charles Farquharson, "Maighstir Iain" remains a folk hero about whom many stories were collected from the oral tradition by John Grant of Glencairn and published in Legends of the Braes o' Mar.

== Early life ==
Farquharson was born in the valley of Braemar, Aberdeenshire, to the chief of Clan Farquharson and Laird of Inverey on 19 April 1699. His father was Lewis Farquharson of Auchindryne (Scottish Gaelic: Ach' an Droighinn, lit. "Thornfield"). According to a manuscript written by his other son Charles Farquharson at the request of Bishop John Geddes, Lewis Farquharson was a younger son and not expected to inherit the estate and accordingly became a local Church of Scotland minister through his older brother's influence. He was instead persuaded to give up his living and convert to Catholicism by John Innes, an illegal Catholic missionary priest then assigned to Glengairn. His eldest brother, Lewis Farquharson, alias "Young Auchindryne" in Scottish parlance, later inherited their father's mantle as chief of Clan Farquharson. Through his brother, John was the uncle of future chief Alexander Farquharson.

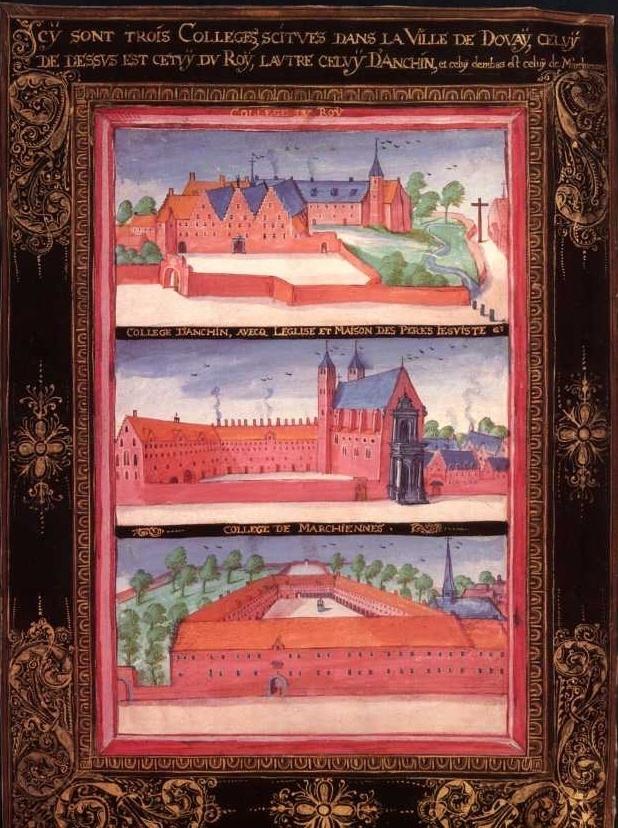
The 3 Colleges at Douai.

John Farquharson entered the Society of Jesus at Tournai. He completed his theology at the Scotch College, Douay, in 1729, and in October that year landed at Edinburgh to serve as an underground Catholic missionary priest. He was stationed by Bishop Hugh MacDonald, the equally underground Vicar Apostolic of the Highland District, in Strathglass and Lochaber.

== Religious work ==
While working, Farquharson was arrested and first imprisoned at the chief's residence of Erchless Castle and then interrogated at Fort Augustus, but was then released due to the intercession of the Clan Chisholm tacksman of Strathglass and returned to his ministry. He was ultimately joined there by two fellow Jesuits; his brother Charles Farquarson and future Catholic martyr Alexander Cameron. According to Colin Chisholm and Dom Odo Blundell of Fort Augustus Abbey, the three priests' residence and secret Mass house was inside a cave known as (Scottish Gaelic: Glaic na h'eirbhe lit. "the hollow of the hard-life"), which was located underneath the cliff of a big boulder at Brae of Craskie, near Beauly (Scottish Gaelic: A' Mhanachainn) in Glen Cannich (Scottish Gaelic: Gleann Chanaich).

Soon after, Farquharson's clerk, Alexander Chisholm (Scottish Gaelic: Alastair Bàn MacDhomhnuill 'ic Uilleam), was arrested and imprisoned inside "The Red Dungeon" at Beauly Castle by Lord Lovat, the chief (Scottish Gaelic: Mac Shimidh Mòr) of Clan Fraser of Lovat. When Lord Lovat, despite being a Catholic himself, refused an in-person request for the release of his clerk, Farquarson, who was not a native speaker of the language, composed a satirical Gaelic poem reviling Lovat. Farquharson also predicted, correctly, that Lord Lovat would soon be both lacking his head and despised as a traitor "to both kings". Upon hearing the poem, which was a very accomplished literary work, recited to him during a dinner party at Eskadale, Lovat first thought it was the work of the acclaimed local poet, Mrs. Fraser of Guisachan in Glen Affric, until he heard the real author named. Satirical poetry and its authors have traditionally been viewed in the Gàidhealtachd with supernatural terror ever since pre-Christian times, but in this case there was added urgency, as the brothers Farquharson were both widely believed in Strathglass to have, "the gift of prophecy." As Lord Lovat did not wish to call down upon himself, "any more disagreeable prophecies," he immediately ordered the clerk's release. Even so, Lord Lovat continued to aid the joint governmental and local Presbyterian synod's crackdown against the three priests and the Catholics of Clan Fraser of Lovat.

In September 1744, Farquharson was arrested after surrendering to the authorities. "The field of the frontal blow"). John Farquharson was then conveyed to Edinburgh in his sacerdotal vestments. He must have been released at the very latest when Edinburgh fell to the Jacobite Army, as he and Charles were back to ministering in Strathglass well before the Battle of Culloden.

However, he was again taken prisoner with his brother and held in Inverness Gaol, until "they were taken to London from Inverness in HMS Pamela and confined for 2 1/2 months in the hold of a man-of-war in the Thames, where they had to endure the insults of their guard and even physical violence." For a long period after the Battle of Culloden, HMS Pamela served, like many Royal Navy vessels filled with more than 900 both real and imagined Jacobites, as a prison hulk anchored off Gravesend in the River Thames.

After the cries of a dying Catholic prisoner for a priest were heard by the captains of the surrounding prison hulks, Royal Navy Captain John Fergussone grudgingly allowed John Farquarson to board HMS Furnace to minister to the dying prisoner and the Jesuit found himself face to face with an emaciated Alexander Cameron. After first receiving Holy Communion and the Last Rites, Cameron offered the Tridentine Mass while John Farquharson served him at the altar. Soon after, Alexander Cameron died with Farquarson by his side on 19 October 1746.

"The [priests'] condition was gradually eased until, after fifteen months imprisonment, they were", summoned to a meeting. According to Father Charles MacDonald, "the survivors were brought before the Duke of Newcastle, who informed them that the Government was disposed to deal leniently in their case, and therefore would sentence them to perpetual banishment from the country, provided they could give bail of £1,000 that they would never return. As this was an absurd proposal, these poor priests having neither friends nor money, the Duke compromised the matter by asking them to go bail for each other. They got over to Holland, but most of them came back again." Even though all primary sources from the era confirm the reliability of the first account the Farquharson brothers told of their imprisonment in cruel, unsanitary, and inhumane conditions, according to The Celtic Magazine correspondent Colin Chisholm of Lietry, John Farquharson alleged in later years to the Catholics of Strathglass that the conditions aboard HMS Pamela were not at all as bad as he had previously stated Farquharson, who may have been suffering from psychological trauma and preferring not to talk about the real memories of his incarceration, alleged in later years that it was decided in Edinburgh that he was to be transported to "a penal settlement" in the Electorate of Hannover.m Also according to Colin Chisholm, "After a favorable passage, the Captain landed Mr. Farquarson in Hanover, and in doing so whispered in his ear that his engagement was now at an end; that he would be leaving Hanover at such a time, and that he would be happy of his company on the homeward voyage. The hint was enough. As soon as the vessel got clear of the Hanoverian coast, the priest suddenly appeared at the Captain's table, and he was brought safely back to his native country without having incurred any real danger or expense. He soon made his way to Strathglass, where he remained until he was selected as prefect of studies for the Catholic College at Douai."

== Later life and death ==
The Farquharson brothers reportedly settled at the Scots College in Douai, where surviving letters reveal that the rector, Crookshank, desperately wanted to be rid of them. John Farquharson remained in Douai, until, according to a 19 July 1748 letter from Crookshank to the general, he departed France to return to Scotland and his mission in Strathglass on 5 July 1748. After a brief time in Scotland he again returned to France. After king Louis XV's suppression of the Jesuits within the Kingdom of France in 1763, Farquharson, who was a man "of elegant manners, and much respected by everyone", was temporarily protected from arrest and expulsion by the local population of Douai and by the Parlement of the County of Artois, who refused to enforce the king's decree. Eventually, the Jesuits had to move the college to Dinant, in what was then the independent Prince-Bishopric of Liège, but it was only a temporary respite and in 1773, when Farquharson was 74 years of age, Pope Clement XIV declared the Jesuits dissolved and the college in Dinant was also required to close. Farqhuarson returned to Scotland once again, where Jesuit priests continued to serve in the Highland and Lowland districts despite the suppression, in 1773 and lived principally in the valley of Braemar, while serving as chaplain and spiritual director to his nephew, the laird of Inverey and Balmoral. After he died at Balmoral Castle on 13 October 1782, bishop John Geddes eulogized John Farquharson as, "a man of primitive simplicity and exemplary virtue." He lies buried in the churchyard at Castletown, in what is now part of the village of Braemar.

== Poetry and oral work ==
In response to the Ossianic controversy, Farquharson transcribed an immense manuscript collection of local oral literature and oral poetry. The manuscript reportedly included many tales from the Fenian Cycle of Scottish mythology; every work of oral poetry that appeared in Ossian were reportedly in this collection, and other verses about the Fianna never collected, translated, or adapted by James Macpherson and which Farquharson considered, in many cases, to be greatly superior to anything in print. The manuscript in Farquharson's own handwriting was later described by his former students as, "in folio, large paper, about three inches thick, written close and in a small letter". It was donated in 1772 to the Scots College, Douai. Instead of being carefully preserved, however, the manuscript was used to light fires at the College by those unfamiliar with both the Gaelic language and the manuscript's great importance to Scottish Gaelic literature.
