= Maighread Fhriseil =

- Occupation: Poet
- Spouse: William Fraser of Guisachan
- Parents: John MacDonell, 4th of Ardnabie (father); Mary Macdonell (mother)

Maighread Fhriseil, Baintighearna Ghiùthsachain (English: Margaret Fraser, the Lady of Guisachan) (fl. 1740s–1790s) was a Scottish composer and collector of Gaelic language ballads. She was referred to in English as Mrs. Fraser of Culbokie.

She was born Margaret MacDonell, the daughter of John MacDonell, wadsetter of Ardnabie, and Mary MacDonell, daughter of Raghnall MacDonell of Glengarry. She married William Fraser, 8th of Guisachan and Culbokie and they had nine sons and five daughters.

None of her work was published in her lifetime and was preserved through oral tradition. Her earliest known work, which only partially survives in a few stanzas published in an anthology in 1900, commemorates the destruction of her family home in Guisachan by the forces of the Duke of Cumberland. Another of her works, published in An Gaidheal in 1871, was "Cumha Dhòmhnaill Fhriseil" ("A Lament for Donald Frasier"), a poem about the death of her son, killed while serving in the Austrian army, likely in the Flanders Campaign of 1792 to 1795.

She was recognized as an expert on the Gaelic language, cited as an authority during the Ossian controversy, and was said to have taught the language to the Rev. John Farquharson. She had a large collection of Gaelic manuscripts she referred to as Am Balg Solair ("bag of fortuitous goods"), which was said to be carried to America by her son Simon Fraser and lost after he died in prison during the American Revolutionary War. Simon Fraser was the father of explorer Simon Fraser.
