= Cannich =

Village in the Highlands of Scotland

Coordinates: 57.3435°N 4.7650°W

Cannich: Scottish Gaelic: Canaich
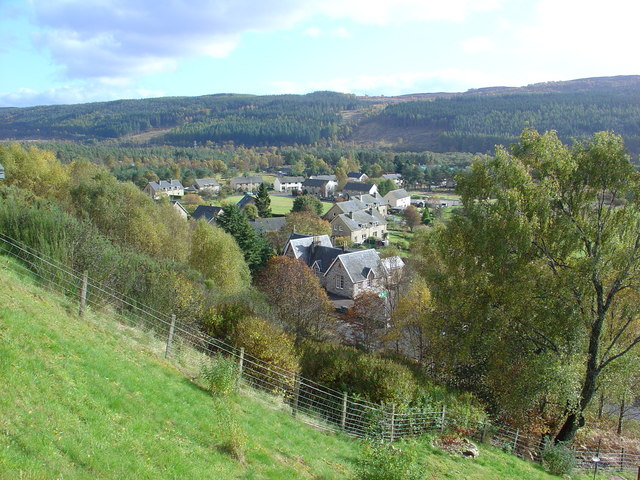

- Location within the Inverness area
- OS grid reference: NH337315
- Council area: Highland
- Lieutenancy area: Inverness
- Country: Scotland
- Sovereign state: United Kingdom
- Post town: BEAULY
- Postcode district: IV4
- Dialling code: 01456
- Police: Scotland
- Fire: Scottish
- Ambulance: Scottish
- UK Parliament: Ross, Skye and Lochaber
- Scottish Parliament: Skye, Lochaber and Badenoch

Cannich (Gaelic: Canaich) is a village at the southern end of Strathglass, in the Highlands of Scotland, about 26 miles (42 km) west of the city of Inverness. It is at the furthest point of the A831 that loops around the Aird from Beauly to Drumnadrochit.

It is home to Strathglass Shinty Club, one of the oldest organised shinty clubs in the world.

There is a camping and caravan park, a river-side chalet park, a well stocked village store and many B & B's or self catering accommodation options to choose from.

There are many opportunities for hill mountain and glen walking in the local area, and for other outdoor activities, including fishing, cycling and canoeing. The surrounding area is very remote and unspoilt, and has limited facilities.

Cannich is at the confluence of two rivers, the River Cannich and the River Affric, which combine on the east side of the village to become the River Glass.

== History ==
The game of shinty and the Strathglass club owe much to Captain Chisholm. He chaired a meeting in the Glen Affric Hotel, Cannich, on 27 January 1880, at which he was elected the first Chief. Duncan Chisholm, Raonabhraid, was voted in as secretary and treasurer, and 10 Chieftains representing each of the districts in the Strath were also elected. The club's first honorary president was The Chisholm, Erchless Castle. Captain Chisholm produced the first constitution, rules and regulations of Strathglass Shinty Club, which were approved at the first general meeting, again held in the Glen Affric Hotel, on Tuesday 10 February 1880. A total of 131 club members were enrolled initially. The Highlander newspaper said of the rule book: “It reflects great credit on all concerned, artist, author, and also testifies to the methodical and business-like way in which the Strathglass men mean to go to work.”

In the late 1940s a massive hydro-electric dam project saw thousands of people employed in the area, with temporary accommodation centred in the village. One Nissen hut still survives on the edge of the shinty club site.

At the end of May 2023, a huge wildfire burned 30 sq mi (78 km^{2}) of land near the village in what may be the largest wildfire ever recorded in the UK.

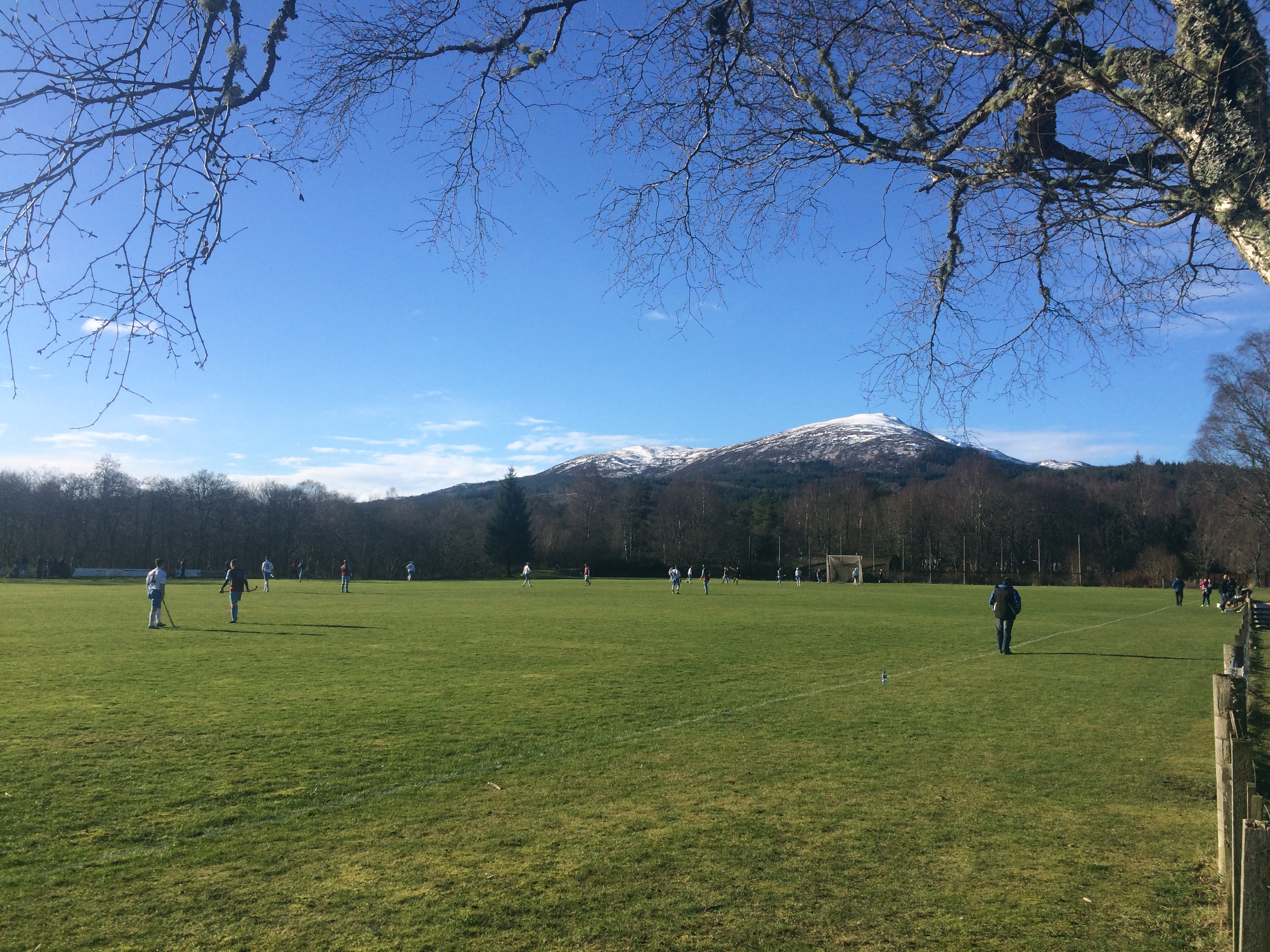
Shinty Pitch at Cannich. Nissen Hut visible behind goals.
