= Glenfiddich Spirit of Scotland Awards =

Awards to notable Scots

- Current: 16th Glenfiddich Spirit of Scotland Awards
- Country: Scotland
- Presented by: Glenfiddich
- First award: 1998

The Glenfiddich Spirit of Scotland Awards are annual awards given to notable Scottish people. It is sponsored by the Scotch whisky company Glenfiddich, in association with The Scotsman newspaper. Nine awards are given out for art, business, environment, food, music, screen, sport, writing, and "Top Scot". A consulting panel nominates four people in each category, with the winner decided by public vote. The "Top Scot" category is an open award, with the public able to nominate anyone. The awards were established in 1998.

== 2014 ==
Category	Winner	Remarks	Other Nominees
Top Scot	Matthew McVarish	Actor on Me Too! and River City	
Art	John Byrne	Playwright and artist	Kate Gray; Katie Paterson; Rachel Maclean
Business	Gavin Dutch	Founder of Kotikan, a mobile app development company	
Environment	Jennie Martin	Founder of Wild things!, an environmental education charity	
Food	Jonathan MacDonald	Chef and owner of Glasgow restaurant "Ox and Finch"	
Music	Paolo Nutini	Singer/songwriter	Roddy Hart & the Lonesome Fire; Twin Atlantic; Young Fathers
Screen	James McAvoy	Actor, appeared in Filth	
Sport	Scottish Commonwealth Games Medallists	Joint award for all of the medal winners	
Writing	Sally Magnusson	Author, journalist and broadcaster, wrote a memoir about her mother's battle with dementia.	Jude Barber and Louise Welsh, The Empire Cafe A. L. Kennedy; Rona Munro

== 2013 ==
Category	Winner	Remarks	Other Nominees
Top Scot	Andy Murray	Tennis player, winner of the men's singles title at Wimbledon	
Art	Ross Sinclair		Ilana Halperin; David Shrigley; Richard Wright
Business	Lewis Family	Mhor business of hotels, restaurants and cafes	Joe Frankel; Bill Nixon; Gareth Williams
Environment	Gordon Buchanan	Wildlife cameraman, filmed The Polar Bear Family & Me	Sandy Boyd; Emma Cooper; Gordon & Lorna Milton
Food	Tony Singh	Edinburgh chef, presented The Incredible Spice Men on BBC2	Ian Baird & Tommy Dale; Dale Mailley & Edward Murray; Michael Smith
Music	Donald Runnicles	Chief Conductor with the BBC Scottish Symphony Orchestra	Django Django; Calvin Harris; Mogwai
Screen	Kate Dickie	Actress, appeared in Filth and For Those in Peril	Peter Mullan; Claire Mundell; Paul Wright
Sport	Andy Murray	Tennis player, winner of the men's singles title at Wimbledon	Eilidh Doyle; Ryan Mania; Scottish Women's Curling Team
Writing	William McIlvanney		William Dalrymple; David Greig J. K. Rowling (under pen name Robert Galbraith)

== 2012 ==
Category	Winner	Remarks	Other Nominees
Top Scot	Michael Forbes	Farmer at Balmedie, refused to sell his land for Donald Trump's golf course	
Art	Robert McDowell	Owner of Edinburgh arts venue Summerhall	John Bellany; Katrina Brown; Callum Innes
Business	Lucinda Bruce-Gardyne	Cookery writer and founder of gluten-free food company Genius Foods	Bill Dobbie; Ali Smeaton, Fraser Smeaton, Gregor Lawson; Jamie Smith
Environment	Alan Watson Featherstone	Founder of conservation charity Trees for Life	Polly Higgins; Ian Maxwell; Chris Townsend
Food	Gustavo Pardo	Founder of Edinburgh coffee shop Artisan Roast	Claire Macdonald; Mhairi Taylor; Peter Jackson, Dirk Douglas, Patricia Stephen
Music	Julie Fowlis	Gaelic singer, featured in the soundtrack of Brave	Nicola Benedetti; Johnny Lynch; Emeli Sandé
Screen	Kelly Macdonald	Actress, provided the voice for Merida in Brave	Ewen Bremner; Chris Fujiwara; Paul Laverty
Sport	Scottish Olympic and Paralympic Gold Medallists: Tim Baillie (canoeing), Scott Brash (equestrian), Neil Fachie (cycling), Katherine Grainger (rowing), Chris Hoy (cycling), Craig MacLean (cycling), Andy Murray (tennis), David Smith (rowing), Heather Stanning (rowing)	Instead of drawing up a shortlist of four nominees for voting, the award was given to all of the Scottish Olympic and Paralympic gold medal winners	
Writing	Ewan Morrison	Author	Janice Galloway; Kirsty Gunn; Ali Smith

== 2011 ==
Category	Winner	Remarks	Other Nominees
Top Scot	Gordon Rintoul	Director of National Museums Scotland	
Art	David Mach	Precious Light exhibition of collages and sculptures	
Business	Simon Howie	Chairman of Simon Howie Foods	
Environment	Alan Bowman	Researching the varroa mite, which affects bees	
Food	Norman MacDonald	Proprietor of Café One in Inverness	
Music	David Paul Jones	Composer	
Screen	Karen Gillan	Actress, played Amy Pond in Doctor Who	
Sport	Neil Fachie	Paralympic cyclist	Don Lennox
Writing	Alan Bissett	Author	

== 2010 ==
The consulting panel comprised John McLellan, editor at The Scotsman and other correspondents, Sally Gordon of Glenfiddich, Peter Irvine and Stuart Nisbet from Unique Events, Fiona Bradley of the Fruitmarket Gallery, Celia Stevenson, and David Sole.

Category	Winner	Remarks	Other Nominees
Top Scot			
Art			
Business	John March	CEO of BigDNA Ltd	
Environment			
Food			Mac Mackie and family, Victor and Carina Contini; Roy Brett, Iain Burnett
Music			
Screen			
Sport	Mark Beaumont		Chris Paterson, Alastair Kellock; Catriona Morrison, Leven Brown and Don Lennox
Writing	Andrew O'Hagan		

== 2009 ==
Category	Winner	Remarks	Other Nominees
Top Scot	Susan Boyle		
Art	Nicky & Robert Wilson	Jupiter Artland	
Business	Richard Dixon	Vets Now	
Environment	Mike Robinson	Stop Climate Chaos Scotland	
Food	Pete Gottgens	Ardeonaig	
Music	John McCusker		
Screen	Peter Capaldi		
Sport	Ronald Ross	Shinty	
Writing	Ian Rankin		

== 2008 ==
Category	Winner	Remarks	Other Nominees
Top Scot	Chris Hoy		
Art	Gareth Hoskins		
Business	Fraser Doherty		
Environment	Tanya Ewing	Ewgeco inventor	
Food	John Sinclair		
Music	Peter Gregson		
Screen	James McAvoy		
Sport	Mark Beaumont		
Writing	Mark Millar		

== 2007 ==
Kirsty Wark hosted the event held on Friday 30 November 2007

Category	Winner	Remarks	Other Nominees
Top Scot	Mick Jackson		
Art	David Shrigley		
Business	Mick Jackson		
Environment	Paul Ramsay		
Food	Salar Smokehouse		
Music	Edywn Collins		
Screen	David Tennant		
Sport	Alex Marshall		
Writing	Christopher Brookmyre		

== 2006 ==
Category	Winner	Remarks	Other Nominees
Top Scot	Walter Smith		
Art	Claire Barclay		
Business	Mary Dickson		
Food	The Really Garlicky Company		
Music	Paolo Nutini		
Screen	Gordon Ramsay		
Sport	British Wheelchair Curling Team		
Theatre	David MacLennan		
Writing	Alan Spence		

== 2005 ==
Lorraine Kelly hosted the event.

Category	Winner	Remarks	Other Nominees
Top Scot	Ian Rankin		
Art	Jim Lambie		
Broadcast	Stuart Cosgrove		
Business	Graeme Cox		
Food	Andrew Fairlie		
Music	Nicola Benedetti		
Screen	Leslie Hills		
Sport	Andrew Murray		
Writing	Rory Stewart		

== 2004 ==
Category	Winner	Remarks	Other Nominees
Top Scot	Shirley Robertson		
Art	Fiona Bradley		
Broadcast	Still Game		
Business	Angus McSween		
Food	Allan Donald		
Music	Roddy MacLeod		
Screen	Brian Cox		
Sport	Colin Montgomerie		
Writing	Louise Welsh		

== 2003 ==
Category	Winner	Remarks	Other Nominees
Top Scot	Sharleen Spiteri		
Art	Elizabeth Blackadder		
Business	Ian Wood		
Food	Heart Buchanan		
Music	Sharleen Spiteri		
Screen	Ewan McGregor		
Sport	Ronald Ross		
Writing	McCall Smith		

== 2002 ==
Category	Winner	Remarks	Other Nominees
Top Scot	Women's Olympic Curling Team		
Ambassador	Sam Torrance		
Art	Jack Vettriano		
Business	Susan Rice		
Creative Talent	Colin MacIntyre		
Food	Shirley Spear		
Innovator	Malcolm Atkinson		
Sport	Chris Hoy		

== 2001 ==
Category	Winner	Remarks	Other Nominees
Top Scot	JK Rowling		
Art	Kenny Hunter		
Business	Ivor Tiefenbrun		
Food	Craig Stevenson		
Music	Travis		
Screen	Gerard Butler		
Sport	Alain Baxter		
Writing	Ian Rankin		

== 2000 ==
Category	Winner	Remarks	Other Nominees
Top Scot	Katherine Grainger		
Art	Roderick Buchanan		
Business	Chris Gorman		
Food	Nick Nairn		
Music	The Delgados		
Screen	Ian Bannen	Awarded posthumously	
Sport	David Coulthard		
Writing	Liz Lochhead		

== 1999 ==
Category	Winner	Remarks	Other Nominees
Top Scot	Sharleen Spiteri		
Art	Alison Watt		
Books	Iain Banks		
Business	Charan Gill		
Film	Peter Mullan		
Food	Carina Contini		
Music	John McCusker		
Sport	Alex Ferguson		

== 1998 ==
Category	Winner	Remarks	Other Nominees
Top Scot	Kirsty Wark		
Art	Will Maclean		
Books	James Kelman		
Business	Brian Souter		
Film	Ewan McGregor		
Food	Andrew Radford		
Music	Martyn Bennett		
Sport	Peter Nicol		

== See also ==
- Glenfiddich Food and Drink Awards
