= Strathglass =

Strath or wide and shallow valley in the Northwest Highlands of Scotland

Coordinates: 57.369175°N 4.711283°W

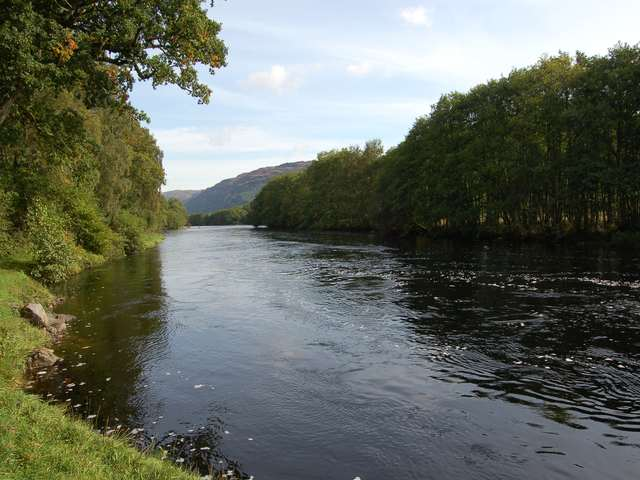
The River Glass running through the strath

Strathglass is a strath or wide and shallow valley in the Northwest Highlands of Scotland down which runs the meandering River Glass from the point at which it starts at the confluence of the River Affric and Abhainn Deabhag to the point where, on joining with the River Farrar at Struy, the combined waters become the River Beauly. Although less densely populated than was formerly the case, Strathglass has played an important role in Scottish history, both secular and religious, and in Scottish Gaelic literature.

== Geography ==
The A831 road runs southwest from the vicinity of Erchless Castle up the length of Strathglass and serves the village of Cannich which is the largest settlement within the valley. The road then runs east from here via Glen Urquhart to Drumnadrochit beside Loch Ness. A minor road continues southwest up the valley from Cannich towards Glen Affric. Strathglass was also followed by a line of electricity pylons but that has been replaced by a line of new pylons across Eskdale Moor to the east of the strath. Both flanks of the valley are heavily wooded; on the higher ground to the northwest, beyond the forests are the moors of Struy Forest and Balmore Forest.

== History ==
Strathglass has been carved out by water and glacial action along the line of the Strathglass Fault through Loch Eil Group psammites of the Loch Ness Supergroup. The northeast–southwest aligned fault is a Caledonoid tectonic feature. The floor of the valley is formed from alluvium deposited by the river, backed by remnant river terraces in places.

The Christianisation of the Picts and Gaels of Strathglass is believed to have been spearheaded by Irish missionaries of the Celtic Church from Iona Abbey, during the abbacy of St Columba's kinsman and immediate successor, St Baithéne mac Brénaind, who is referred to in Strathglass as St Bean.

Beginning on 27 May 1700, underground Catholic bishop Thomas Nicolson had visited Strathglass. In his later report, Nicolson had described the region, unlike the Hebrides, as so abundant with trees that the local population lived in wattle and daub houses instead of dry stone and thatch crofts. He explained, "They are called Criel Houses, because the larger timbers are interlaced with wickerwork in the same way baskets are made. They are covered outside with sods, or divots. All of the houses on the mainland, wherever we went, are built in this fashion, except those of the lairds and principal gentry. Strathglass is partly inhabited by Frasers, whose chief is Lord Lovat, and partly by Chisholms under the Laird of Strathglass. These latter are all Catholics."

The once heavily populated Strathglass began to empty of its people, first through voluntary emigration and the estate clearances ordered by Mrs. William Chisholm of Chisholm in 1801, "In 1801, no less than 799 took ship at Fort William and Isle Martin from Strathglass, The Aird, Glen Urquhart, and the neighbouring districts, all for Pictou, Nova Scotia; while in the following year 473 from the same district left Fort William for Upper Canada, and 128 for Pictou. Five hundred and fifty went aboard another ship at Knoydart, many of whom were from Strathglass. In 1803, four different batches of 120 souls each, by four different ships, left Strathglass, also for Pictou; while not a few went away with emigrants from other parts of the Highlands."

Odo Blundell commented in 1909 that the language, customs, and oral tradition of Strathglass were better preserved in Nova Scotia than at home.

== Local residents ==
- John Farquharson
- John Chisholm (1752-1814), Catholic priest, bishop, Vicar Apostolic of the Highland District, and composer of Christian poetry and hymns in the Scottish Gaelic language.
- Catriona Nic Fhearghais, composer of Jacobite lament, Mo rùn geal òg
