= Mo rùn geal òg =

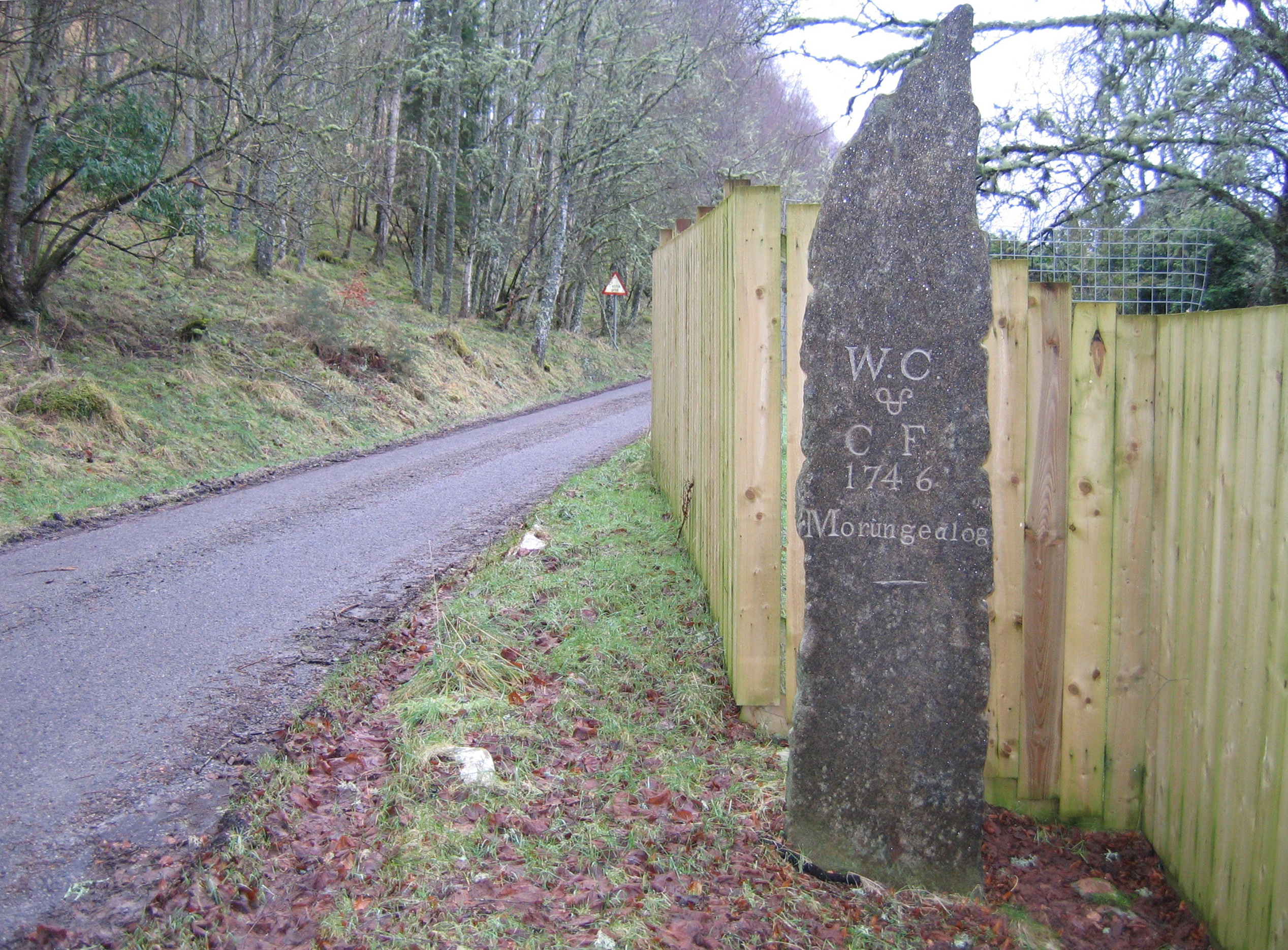
Memorial to William Chisholm and Christina Ferguson, near Struy

"Mo rùn geal òg" (My fair young love), alternately known as "Cumha do dh'Uilleam Siseal" (Lament for William Chisholm) is a Scottish Gaelic lament written by Christina Fergusson for her husband, William Chisholm of Strathglass, who was killed at the Battle of Culloden in 1746.

== Life ==
Fergusson was possibly born in Contin, Ross-shire, where her father is said, according to Ronald Black, to have been, "a blacksmith - chiefly employed in making dirks and other implements of war." She was married to William Chisholm, who was the tacksman of Inis nan Ceann, near the modern village of Mauld in Strathglass. Chisholm was also a blacksmith, armourer, and standard bearer for the chief of Clan Chisholm, to whom he was a very near relative.

When Clan Chisholm rose during the Jacobite rising of 1745, William Chisholm joined the Jacobite Army battalion commanded by the chief's youngest son, Ruaridh Òg. A roadside memorial, erected by the Frasers of Mauld near Struy in Strathglass, now marks the site of William and Christina Chisholm's criel house and their last farewell. William was killed after the Battle of Culloden in 1746, allegedly while fighting at the door of a barn to defend the wounded survivors of the Chisholm battalion from the no quarter that he knew would follow their capture. Seven bullet holes are said to have been found in his body.

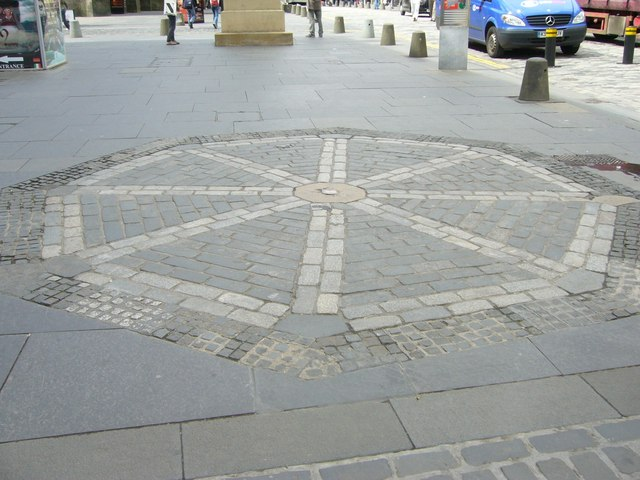
The original location of the Mercat Cross, where the Jacobite Army standard borne by William Chisholm was publicly burned after his death.

One of the 14 Jacobite battle flags taken at Culloden, which were later burnt at the Mercat Cross in Edinburgh, was the white linen banner of Clan Chisholm, which had been borne by either John MacDonald or William Chisholm.

In her husband's memory, a bereft Ferguson wrote Mo Rùn Geal Òg (My Fair Young Love). In the poem, Christina, while insisting that she is still a loyal Jacobite, rebukes Prince Charles Edward Stuart, saying that the loss of her husband in the fight for a second Stuart Restoration has left her desolate. Literary scholar John MacKenzie later wrote that Christina, "devotes to the Prince one solitary expression of sympathetic condolence... and then, with the wings and wail of a mateless dove, flutters over the mangled carcass of her husband, and depicts his matchless person and soul in language that would melt the sternest heart to sympathy."

== In popular culture ==
- The song has also been covered and recorded by traditional singers, including Flora MacNeil, Mary Ann Kennedy, Anne Lorne Gillies, and Julie Fowlis.
