= Trees for Life (Scotland) =

Rewilding charitable company in the UK

- Formation: 1993
- Type: Conservation charity
- Location: The Park, Findhorn Bay, Forres, Moray, Scotland
- Region served: Scottish Highlands
- Revenue: £4,162,000 (2023)
- Website: https://treesforlife.org.uk/

Trees for Life is a registered charity working to rewild the Scottish Highlands.

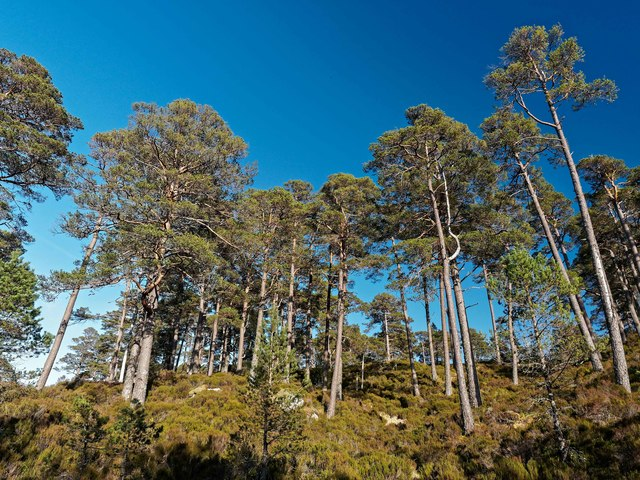
Scots pine

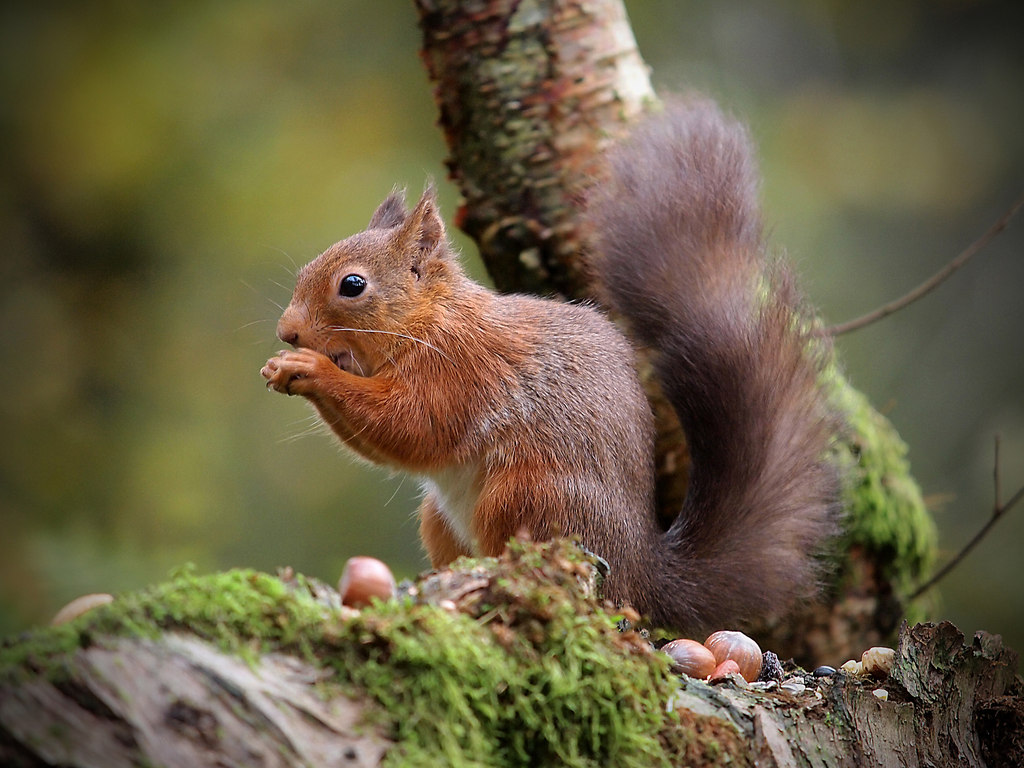
Red squirrel

== Mission ==
Trees for Life states that its long-term plan is to see Dundreggan restored to a wild landscape of diverse natural forest cover, with the return of native wildlife. Rewilding supports nature, climate and people by boosting biodiversity, creating jobs, and supporting re-peopling.

== History ==
Trees for Life was founded in 1986 by Alan Watson Featherstone, as a project under the Findhorn Foundation. Practical work began in 1989, and the first volunteer week was held in 1991. Trees for Life registered as an independent charity in 1993.

Trees for Life works to restore the Caledonian Forest, especially in Glen Affric where one of the most important fragments of Caledonian Forest survived. In August 2008 Trees for Life purchased the 4,100-hectare (10,000-acre) Dundreggan Estate in Glenmoriston, in the Scottish Highlands – one of the largest areas in the UK to be bought for forest restoration.

In 2020, golden eagles returned to breed for the first time in 40 years.

The charity established the Dundreggan Rewilding Centre, the first of its kind in the world, which opened in April 2023 at the Dundreggan Estate.

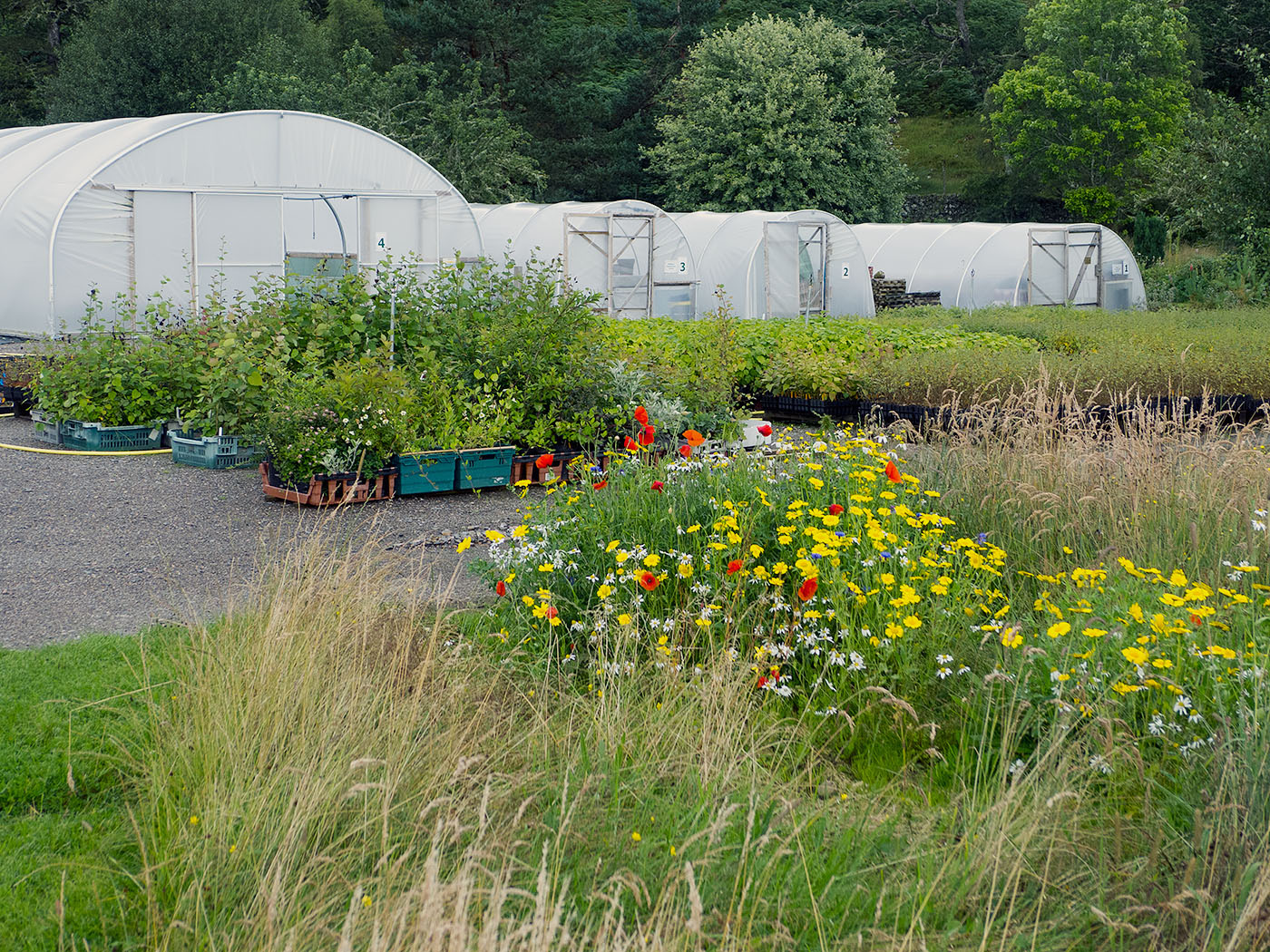
Dundreggan Tree Nursery

Initial work took place in Glen Cannich. TFL also supported woodland creation in Glen Affric, where they operate in partnership with Forestry and Land Scotland and the National Trust for Scotland. Work expanded into other nearby glens, such as Glenmoriston, to the south of Glen Affric, at Achnashellach, and at Corrimony, where they partnered with the Royal Society for the Protection of Birds.

Affric Highlands is a 30-year collaborative initiative by Trees for Life and Rewilding Europe who are working to restore woodland, peatland and riverside habitats in the Scottish Highlands.

In June 2022, Affric Highlands was recommended for UN flagship status by the Scottish and UK governments.

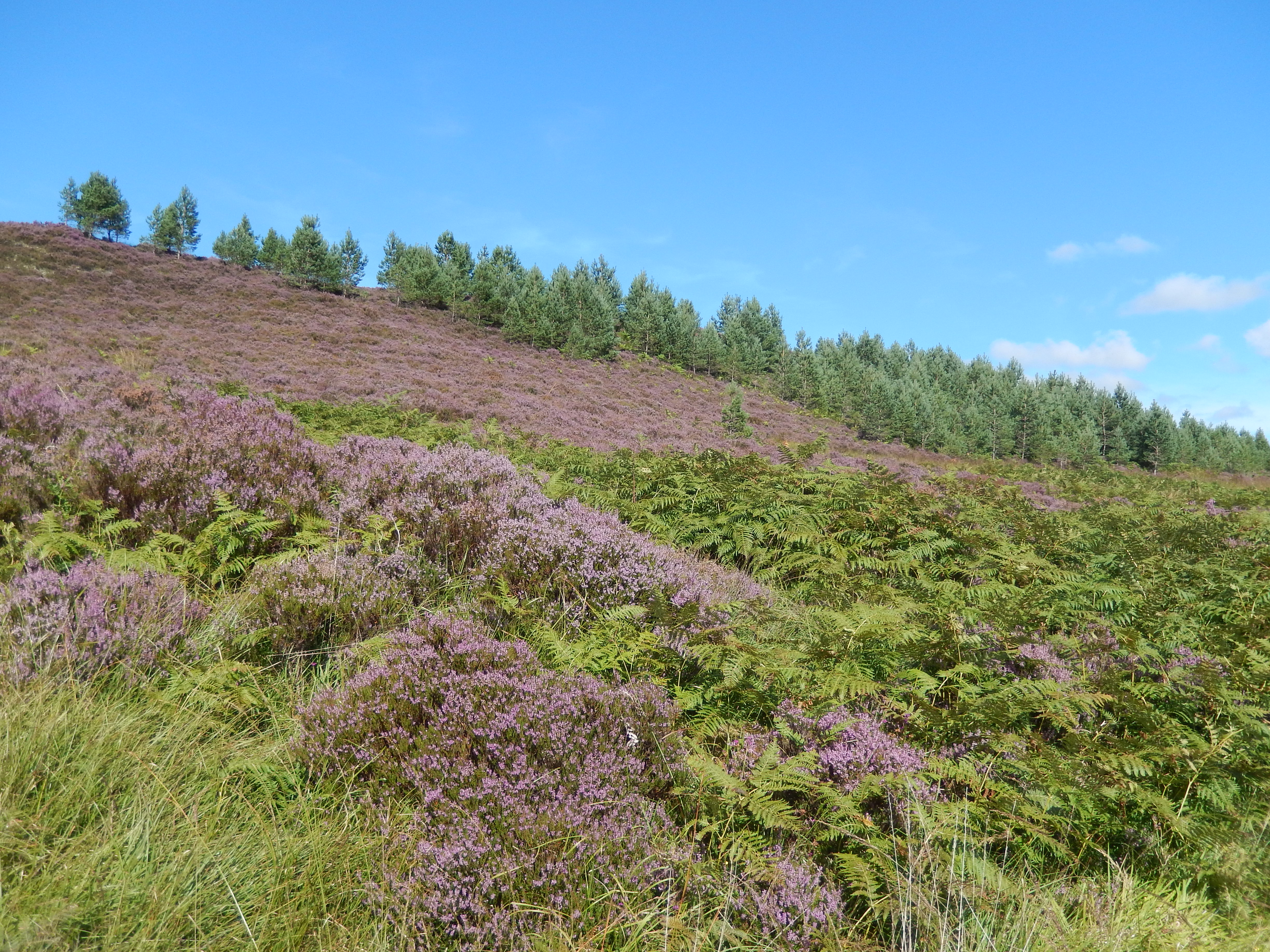
Young Scots pines planted by Trees for Life on the heather moors at Corrimony

== See also ==
- Rewilding Britain - an organisation founded in 2015 that aims to promote the rewilding of Great Britain.
- Rewilding Europe - a non-profit organisation established in 2011 dedicated to creating rewilded landscapes throughout Europe.
