= Dog Falls, Glen Affric =

Waterfall in Glen Affric, Highland, Scotland

Coordinates: 57.31297°N 4.84747°W

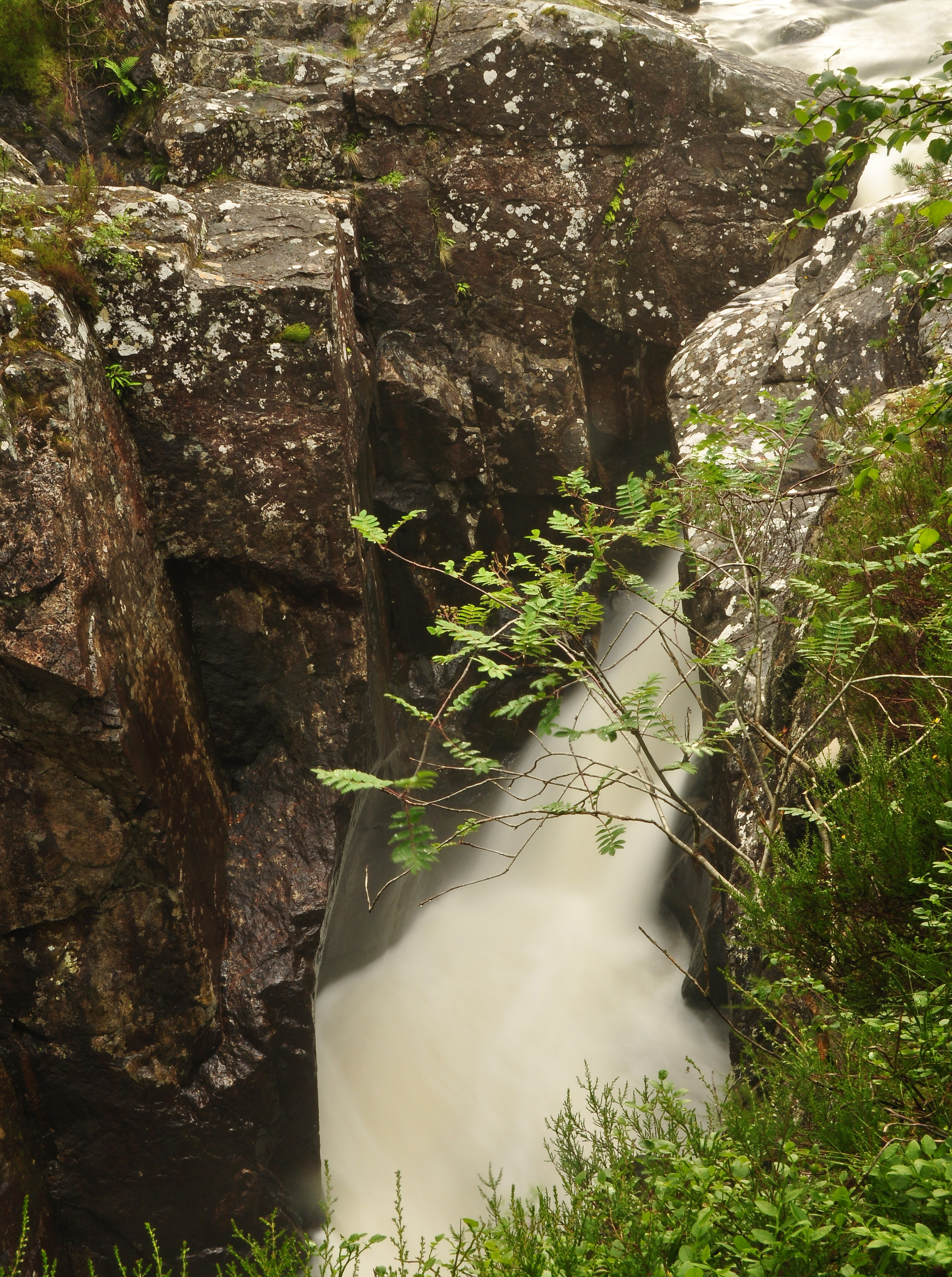
Dog Falls

Dog Falls (Gaelic: Eas a' Choin) is a series of waterfalls on the River Affric, in Glen Affric in the Highlands of Scotland. The falls are within the Glen Affric National Nature Reserve, managed by Forestry and Land Scotland. There are several way-marked paths to the falls.

== See also ==
- Waterfalls of Scotland
