= Alan Watson Featherstone =

Scottish ecologist

Alan Watson Featherstone (born 10 February 1954) is a Scottish ecologist. He is a natural history photographer, speaker and the founder of the conservation charity Trees for Life.

== Biography ==
During the 1970s he travelled throughout the United States, Canada and South America. On his return to the United Kingdom, he joined the Findhorn Foundation in 1978. In October 1986 he organised for an international conference on the world's ecological crisis called, 'One Earth: A Call to Action', involving 240 delegates.

In 1986, he formed Trees for Life, with the aim of restoring the Caledonian Forest and its wildlife to the Scottish Highlands. The charity works in partnership with the Forestry Commission, the National Trust for Scotland and the Royal Society for the Protection of Birds (RSPB) at a number of sites to the west of Loch Ness and Inverness. As of April 2014, the charity has planted over one million native trees. In August 2008, Featherstone oversaw the purchase of the 4,000 hectare Dundreggan Estate for £1.65 million in Glenmoriston. The charity has received numerous awards. He has helped to inspire similar ecological restoration projects in the Scottish Borders, Dartmoor in England and the Yendegaia National Park Project in Tierra del Fuego, Chile.

Featherstone gives lectures and workshops and has spoken at the World Wilderness Congress, the Society for Conservation Biology annual conference and the Society for Ecological Restoration conference. He has written articles for journals and magazines as well as appearing on television and radio. He is also a nature photographer. He produced the Findhorn Nature Calendar from 1983 to 1994 and the annual Trees for Life Calendar and Diary from 1988 to 2017. His photographs have been published in Time, BBC Wildlife magazine and the Encyclopædia Britannica.

In 2002, Featherstone established the Restoring the Earth project, "to promote the restoration of the planet's degraded ecosystems as the most important task for humanity in the 21st century". The project is overseen by the Earth Restoration Service of which Featherstone is a trustee. He is also a trustee and former chairman of Wild Things! an environmental education charity based in the North of Scotland and a former trustee of the Findhorn Foundation. He is a trustee of the Findhorn Hinterland Trust, and Trees for Hope, a charity that promotes the ecological restoration of the Fertlle Crescent region.

In 2001 he received the Schumacher Award from the Schumacher Society, for "his inspirational and practical work on conserving and restoring degraded ecosystems".

== Awards ==
- Schumacher Award from the Schumacher Society, 2001.
- Glenfiddich Spirit of Scotland Awards – Environment, 2012.
- RSPB, Outstanding Contribution Award, 2013.
