= River Glass, Strathglass =

River in the Scottish Highlands

Coordinates: 57°25.27′N 4°39.20′W

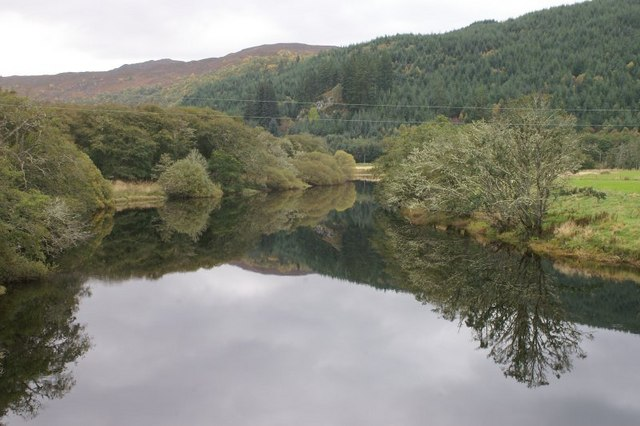
River Glass near Struy

The River Glass (Scottish Gaelic: Abhainn Ghlais) is a river in the Scottish Highlands which flows northeastwards down Strathglass. It begins at the confluence of the River Affric and the Abhainn Deabhag, near the village of Tomich. It is joined by the River Cannich near the village of Cannich, then flows as far as a confluence with the River Farrar near Struy, from which point the merged waters are known as the River Beauly.

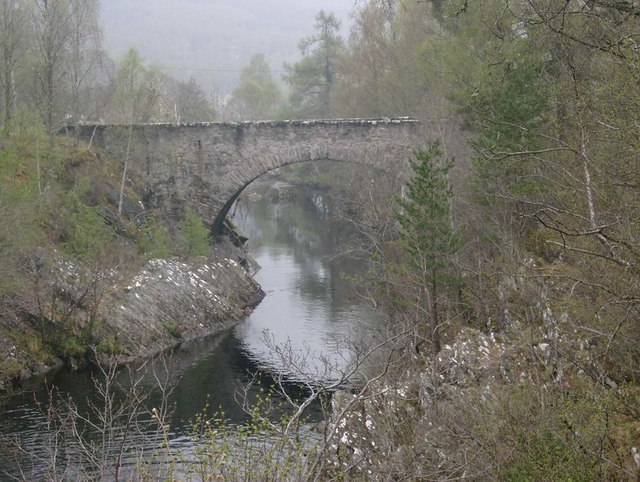
Fasnakyle Bridge

The river is crossed by several bridges:

- Fasnakyle Bridge, unclassified road
- Comar Bridge, near Cannich, carries the A831
- Mauld Bridge, near Struy, unclassified road

== History ==
Following the Scottish Reformation in 1560, the modern site of the Fasnakyle bridge was for many years the location of a secret Mass house whose parishioners were served, like the rest of the Catholic population of Strathglass, by outlawed "heather priests" of the Society of Jesus. According to Odo Blundell, the Mass house was situated so that it could only be approached by a Mass path, "leading from the lower end of Strathglass, eighteen miles distant."

Among the priests of their Order who offered Mass at Fasnakyle before the Suppression of the Jesuits were Frs John Farquharson (1699–1782), Alexander Cameron (1701–1746), and Norman MacLeod (c.1715-1777).

== In popular culture ==
- After his clerk was arrested by Lord Lovat for fishing for Atlantic salmon in the River Glass near the Mass house at Fasnakyle, a satirical Scottish Gaelic poem was composed, in retaliation for Lovat's refusal of an in person request for the clerk's release, shortly before the Jacobite rising of 1745 by Fr. John Farquharson. While denouncing the clan chief for both his disloyalty to the Holy See and for making lavish promises of his loyalty to both the House of Hannover and the House of Stuart at the same time, Fr Farquharson correctly predicted that Lord Lovat's body would soon be without his head and that he would be despised as a traitor "to both kings". After hearing the poem recited aloud, Lord Lovat, who did not wish to provoke "any more disagreeable prophecies", immediately ordered the clerk's release.
