= Fraser Doherty =

Scottish entrepreneur (born 1988)

- Born: born 1988
- Occupation: Entrepreneur

Fraser Doherty (born 1988) MBE is a Scottish entrepreneur from Edinburgh. He is the founder of SuperJam, Envelope Coffee, and co-founder of Beer52. He is also director of the registered Scottish charity, The SuperJam Tea Parties.

Doherty, through SuperJam, has invested in various charitable projects. The SuperJam Tea Parties, which runs tea parties for lonely elderly people who live alone or in care homes, was established by Doherty in 2008.

== Books ==
Doherty published his first book on 5 August 2010, The She book conns recipes for making jams, cakes and desserts and was launched with a vintage tea party at the Bethnal Green Working Men's clu in East London.

On 21 April 2011, Doherty published his second book, SuperBusiness. The book is a guide to starting a business, based on SuperJam's journey from village fetes in Scotland to supermarket shelves around the world. The book was launched with a village fete-themed party aart-up: From idea to launch in 1 weekend" was launched on 25 Aug 2016. In this book, he sets out to start a profitable new business over a weekend.

== Awards ==
Doherty was the 2007 Global Student Entrepreneur of the Year, an international award given to the top student entrepreneur worldwide. Over 750 students from around the world competed in the 2007 Global Student Entrepreneur Awards. He was appointed Member of the Order of the British Empire (MBE) in the 2014 Birthday Honours for services to business.

=== Other awards ===
- Enterprising Young Brit Award (2004)
- Outstanding Young Person of The World Award (2007)
- Biggart Baillie Innovation Award (2007)
- Start-ups Young Entrepreneur of The Year (2007)
- John Logie Baird Innovation Award (2008)
- Glenfiddich Spirit of Scotland Award (2008)
- Global Student Entrepreneur of The Year (2007)
- Supernova's Brightest Young Business (2007)
- BT Essence of The Entrepreneur Award (2009)
- Nectar Business Entrepreneur of The Year (2009)
- Bighearted Scotland Business Person of The Year (2009)
- Smarta 100 Award (2010)
- Inc Magazine 30 under 30 award (2010)
- Ben & Jerry's Join Our Core Finalist (2012)
- British Inspiration Award (2013)

== Books ==
- The SuperJam Cookbook (2010)
- SuperBusiness (2011)
- 48-Hour Start-up: From idea to launch in 1 weekend (2016)
