= Glen Cannich =

Glen and Strath in the Northwest Highlands of Scotland

Coordinates: 57.34°N 4.95°W

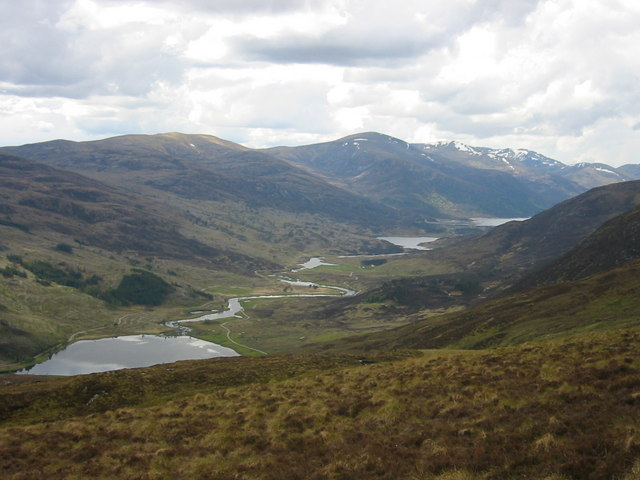
Glen Cannich. River between Loch Mullardoch (far right) and Loch Carrie

Glen Cannich (Scottish Gaelic: Gleann Chanaich) is a long glen and strath in the Northwest Highlands of Scotland and through which runs the River Cannich. Once densely populated before being largely emptied by both voluntary emigration and the Highland Clearances following the Battle of Culloden in 1746, the Glen, which was formerly the property of Clan Chisholm, has played a role in the history of the Catholic Church in Scotland. A minor public road runs up Glen Cannich from Cannich as far as the Mullardoch dam. Other than water capture for the Affric-Beauly hydro-electric power scheme, the major land uses in the glen are commercial forestry and deer stalking.

== Geography ==
Emerging from the reservoir of Loch Mullardoch, the River Cannich flows east to merge with the River Affric at the village of Cannich, their combined waters forming the River Glass.

Downstream of Loch Mullardoch are the smaller natural lochs of Loch a' Bhana, Loch Sealbhanach, Loch Carrie and Loch Craskie through each of which the river flows. Other lochs within the Cannich catchment include (from west to east) Loch an Fraoich-choire, Coire Lochan, Loch a' Choire Dhomhain, Loch a' Choire Bhig, Loch Tuill Bhearnach and Lochan a' Mhill Dhuibh. Within the narrow confines of the eastern end of the glen the river plunges over two waterfalls; Eas Maol Mhairi and Eas an Fhithich. Innumerable burns drain the mountain slopes to the north and south of the river, the largest of which are the Abhainn a' Choilich and Abhainn Sithidh which arise on the eastern slopes of the peak of Sgurr nan Ceathreamhnan.

== History ==
The now ruined chapel at Clachan Comar, beside the holy well of Sputan Bhàin, is on the site of Kilbeathan, an earlier church dedicated to St Baithéne mac Brénaind, who is said locally to have evangelised Strathglass.

Following the Scottish Reformation in 1560, the chiefs of Clan Chisholm and Clan Fraser of Lovat chose, despite official denials, to illegally grant religious toleration to their clansmen. Until the Suppression of the Jesuits in the late 18th-century, the large Catholic population in Glen Cannich and the surrounding region was covertly ministered to by priests of the Society of Jesus. Between 1735 and 1746, the glen was the home and base of operations for three outlawed priests of the Society. Their residence and secret Mass house was inside a cave known as Glaic na h'eirbhe, lit. "the hollow of the hard-life") which was located underneath the cliff of a large boulder at Brae of Craskie in Glen Cannich. According to Monsignor Thomas Wynne, "It was in the nature of a summer sheiling, a command centre for monitoring the traditional activities of cattle reivers; as such it combined a civilising role with the building up of a Catholic mission outside Cameron territory in a way which must have reassured Lochiel on both counts." The entrance to the cave was so well hidden that the three priests successfully eluded, "all attempts of the local garrison to find them."

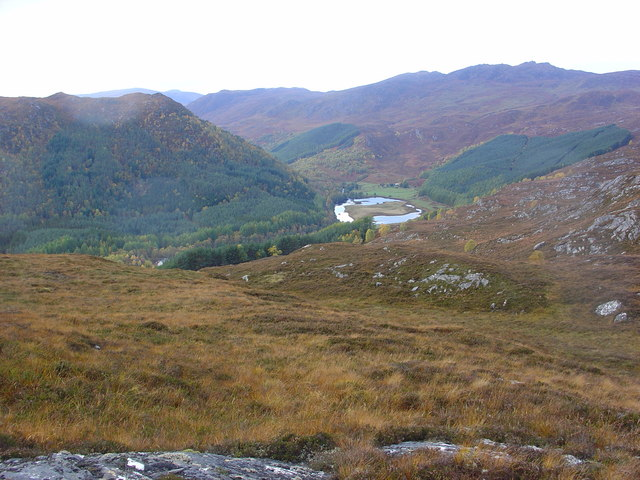
Loch Craskie in Glen Cannich, from the southeast.

Despite the depopulation of much of the countryside of Glen Cannich, Glen Strathfarrar, and Strathglass by both voluntary emigration and the 1801-1855 mass estate clearances ordered by Archibald Campbell Fraser of Lovat and Mrs. William Chisholm of Chisholm, construction of a Catholic church building commenced following Catholic Emancipation in 1829. The church was completed in 1866 and consecrated in 1868.

After belatedly coming into possession of the glen in 1826, Mrs. William Chisholm of Chisholm first waited until 1830 for the remaining leases to expire and then summoned every male who held land there to a meeting at the inn at Cannich. Upon arrival, they were informed by the estate factor that their farms had all been secretly let to sheep farmers from the Scottish Lowlands and that all present and their families must leave Glen Cannich with no negotiation or appeal. Upon hearing the news, Thomas Fraser, 12th Lord Lovat, offered them highly favourable terms to resettle on his own estate at Strathfarrar. Even though it meant relocating his existing tenants in the region, Lord Lovat's offer was accepted and the former Glen Cannich tenants' new leases began on Whitsunday, 1831.

Writing in 1883, Alexander Mackenzie explained the evicted population of the glen had been solidly part of the upper middle class and further wrote, "To give the reader an idea of the class of men who occupied this district, it may be stated that of the descendants of those who lived in Glen Cannich, at one time thickly populated in the Strath, but now a perfect wilderness - there lived in the present generation, no less than three colonels, one major, three captains, three lieutenants, seven ensigns, one bishop, and fifteen priests." Writing in 1885, folklorist and local historian Colin Chisholm of Lietry, who had attended the 1830 meeting at the Cannich inn, further recalled that, before the local Highland Clearances, the population of Glen Cannich was noted, "for happy tenantry and famous deer-stalkers."

Rising waters caused by the Affric-Beauly hydro-electric power scheme following the Second World War ultimately led to still further depopulation.

== Folklore ==
John Farquharson is said to have once had a face to face confrontation with the Devil upon Cannich Bridge and to have forced his opponent to dive into the River Cannich with a hissing sound.

== Local residents ==
- Rt.-Rev. William Fraser (c. 1779–1851), first bishop of the Roman Catholic Diocese of Halifax and then the first Bishop of the Diocese of Arichat.
