= Struy =

Coordinates: 57.42499°N 4.66397°W

Struy: Scottish Gaelic: An t-Srùigh
- Location within the Inverness area
- OS grid reference: NH401403
- Council area: Highland
- Country: Scotland
- Sovereign state: United Kingdom
- Post town: Beauly
- Postcode district: IV4 7
- Police: Scotland
- Fire: Scottish
- Ambulance: Scottish

Struy (Scottish Gaelic: An t-Srùigh or Scottish Gaelic: Sruidh) is a small village at the end of Glen Strathfarrar, about 15 km south-west of Beauly in the Highland council area of Scotland.

== Description ==
The confluence of the River Farrar and the River Glass is a short distance to the east of Struy, here the rivers join to become the River Beauly. The River Farrar is crossed by Thomas Telford's five arch Struy Bridge a short distance to the north, this carries the A831 road. A minor road crosses the Mauld Bridge, over the River Glass, to the south-east of Struy.

== Nature reserve and buildings ==
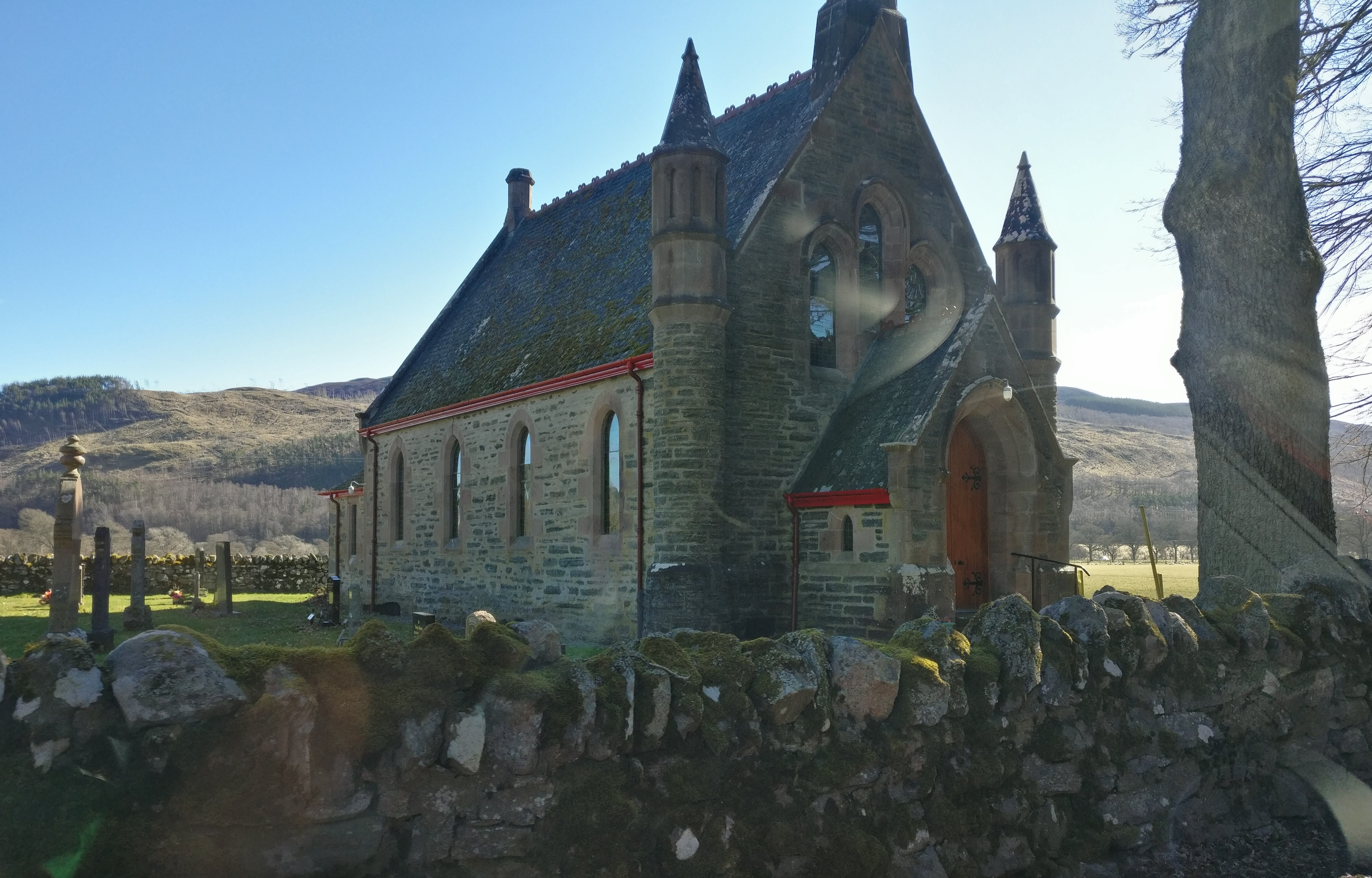
Struy Church

Struy is the place to gain access to the nature reserve of Glen Strathfarrar and four Munros. The road is private and only a limited number of cars are allowed to access through the gate.

Erchless Castle lies about than 1.5 km north-east of Struy. The turreted and crenelated building was built in about 1600 and modified in 1790 and 1895. Nearby are the remains of an Iron-Age dun which measures twelve metres by thirteen metres.

Struy Church, built in 1897, was one of three churches that make up Kilmorach and Erchless parish. The main church at Beauly has weekly services while the services in Struy happened every fortnight before its closure in 2023.

== Local residents ==
- Catriona Nic Fhearghais, war poet and wife of a Clan Chisholm warrior, William Chisholm of Strathglass. Catriona composed one of the most iconic verse laments in Scottish Gaelic literature after her husband fell fighting with the Jacobite Army at the Battle of Culloden in 1746. A roadside memorial at Mauld Bridge, Struy now marks the place where she bade him farewell. They lived a few miles away at Crochail.
