= River Beauly =

River in the Scottish Highlands

Coordinates: 57.42148°N 4.65268°W

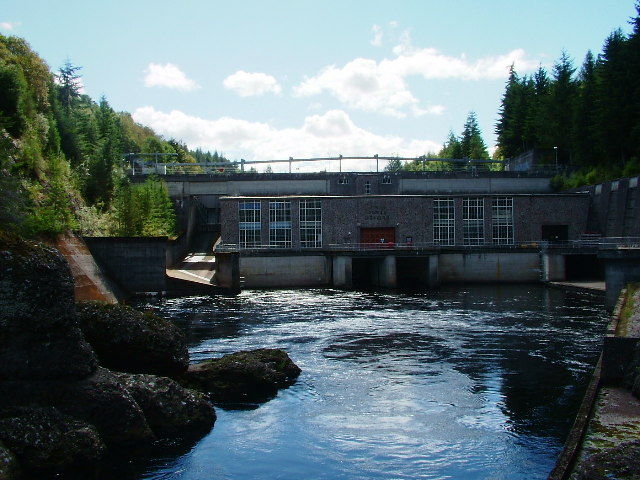
Aigas Power Station

The River Beauly (Scottish Gaelic: Abhainn nam Manach, pronounced [ˈavɪɲ nə ˈmanəx]) is a river in the Scottish Highlands, about 15 km west of the city of Inverness.

It is about 25 kilometres (16 mi) long, beginning near the village of Struy, at the confluence of the River Farrar and the River Glass (grid reference NH408399). The river meanders as it flows east, passing to the south of the village of Beauly and into the Beauly Firth.

The river was first bridged in about 1817, when Thomas Telford constructed the five arched Lovat Bridge about 1 km south west of Beauly. This bridge carried the A9, the main route north, until the Kessock Bridge was opened in 1982. A railway bridge across the river on the outskirts of Beauly was built in the 1860s to carry the Inverness & Ross-shire Railway (now the Far North Line). Another road bridge, near Kilmorack, was built in the 20th century.

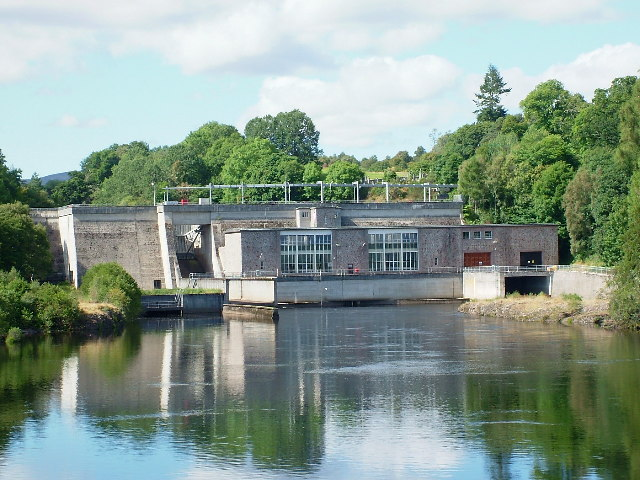
Kilmorack Power Station

The river is part of the Affric-Beauly hydro-electric power scheme, with dams and power stations at Aigas and Kilmorack. Both have 20MW generators and include fish ladders to allow salmon to pass, the Aigas fish ladder is open to visitors in the summer.

Eilean Aigas is an island in the river.
