= Clan Chisholm =

Highland Scottish clan

Chisholm
- Clann Siosal
- Crest: Gules a boar's head couped Or langued Azure
- Motto: Feros ferio (I am fierce with the fierce)

Profile
- Region: Highlands
- District: Ross
- Plant badge: Fern
- Animal: Wild boar
- Pipe music: Chisholm's March

Chief
- Andrew Francis Hamish Chisholm of that Ilk
- Thirty-third Chief of Clan Chisholm
- Historic seat: Erchless Castle
Clan branches
Chisholm of Chisholm (chiefs)
Chisholm of Struy (senior cadets)
Chisholms of Lietry and Kinneries
Chisholms of Knockfin
Chisholms of Muckerach
Allied clans
Clan MacDonald of Lochalsh
Clan Rose
Rival clans
Clan Grant

Clan Chisholm (/ˈtʃɪzəm/ CHIZ-əm; Scottish Gaelic: Siosal, pronounced [ˈʃis̪əl̪ˠ]) is a Highland Scottish clan.

== History ==
=== Origins ===
According to Alexander Mackenzie, the Clan Chisholm is of Norman and Saxon origin. Tradition stating that the Chisholms were a Norman family who arrived in England after the conquest of 1066., the original surname being De Chese to which the Saxon term "Holme" was added. According to the Collins Scottish Clan & Family Encyclopedia the Chisholm name was known in the Scottish Borders since the reign of Alexander III. In early records the name is written as "de Cheseholme", eventually later becoming Chisholm. In Scotland the earliest recorded person of the family is on the Ragman Rolls as "Richard de Chisholm del Counte de Rokesburgh", referring to the Clan Chisholm's seat in Roxburghshire.

One of the earliest recorded members of the family was John de Chesehelme, who in 1254 was mentioned in a bull of Pope Alexander IV.

=== Wars of Scottish Independence ===
In 1296 Richard de Chesehelme rendered homage to Edward I of England and appears on the Ragman Rolls.

Sir John de Chesholme led the clan at the Battle of Bannockburn in 1314 against the English. Robert Chisholm fought against the English at the Battle of Neville's Cross in 1346, was taken prisoner with King David II and probably not released until eleven years later when his royal master returned to Scotland. In 1359 after being knighted by the king he succeeded his grandfather as Constable of Urquhart Castle, and later became Sheriff of Inverness and Justiciar of the North. This Robert was the last Chisholm to hold lands in both the North and South of Scotland. He divided his estates among his younger children.

Robert's son was Alexander Chisholm who married Margaret, heiress of the lands of Erchless. Erchless Castle has been the seat of the chiefs ever since.

=== Conflicts ===
The Chisholms became well known for cattle raiding. In 1498 Wiland Chisholm of Comar and others carried off 56 oxen, 60 cows, 300 sheep, 80 swine and 15 horses belonging to Hugh Rose of the Clan Rose.

In 1513, Wiland Chisholm of Comar and Sir Alexander MacDonell of Glengarry were with Sir Donald MacDonald of Lochalsh on his return from the Battle of Flodden when he decided to attack the Urquhart Castle. Some sources say that Macdonald occupied the castle for three years despite the efforts of the Clan Grant to dislodge him and his companions.

John Chisholm, doctor in surgery, was appointed as chief and principal surgeon to king James VI in September 1573. Sir James Chisholm of Dundorn was one of king James VI's masters of the household.

=== Civil War ===
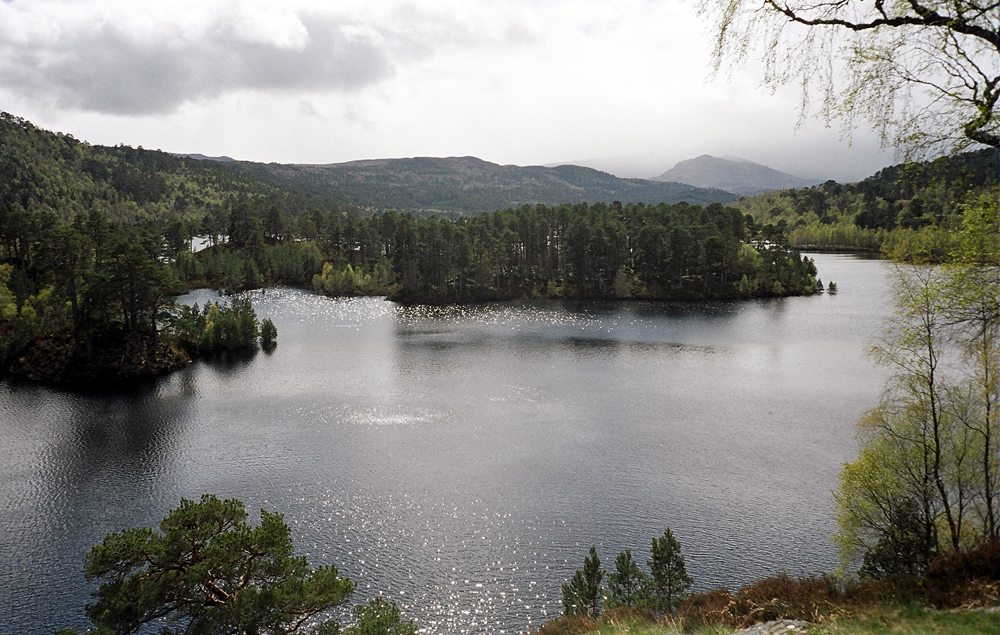
Glen Affric, former Chisholm land

In 1647, Alexander Chisholm was appointed to the committee which arranged the defence of Inverness on behalf of the Covenanters against the Royalists. In 1653 the Chisholms stole cattle from the clans Munro and Fraser, they were however captured and brought to court where they were ordered to return all they had stolen and pay the Chief Munro of Foulis and Chief Fraser of Lovat £1000 interest each.

After the Stuart restoration in 1660, Alexander followed his father as a justice of the peace, and in 1674 was appointed Sheriff Deputy for Inverness. Once again his duties brought him up against the MacDonalds, for in 1679 he was ordered to lead a thousand men of the county to quell a disturbance created by some members of said clan, and in 1681 he was given a commission of fire and sword against them.

=== Jacobite risings ===
==== Jacobite rising of 1715 ====
During the Jacobite rising of 1715, Roderick Maciain Chisholm, supported the Jacobite cause. Chisholm of Crocfin led two hundred clansmen at the Battle of Sherrifmuir in 1715 where they were defeated. Men of the Clan Chisholm were among a group of 400-500 men, which included the Mackenzies and MacDonalds, who led by Kenneth Sutherland, 3rd Lord Duffus, marched on Tain where they proclaimed the Pretender.

==== Jacobite rising of 1719 ====
Some members of the clan took part in the Jacobite rising of 1719. A landing was made on the west of Scotland, and according to one account, the Chisholms were employed as scouts. They were not present at the Battle of Glen Shiel, which ended that Jacobite rebellion. Much of Roderick's lands were afterwards forfeited to the Crown. With a number of other chiefs, Roderick obtained a royal pardon in 1727, but he was never allowed to regain his estates, which his brother administered until 1743, when it was transferred to Roderick's eldest son, Alexander Chisholm, younger of Comar. General Wade's report on the Highlands in 1724, estimated the clan strength at 150 men.

==== Jacobite rising of 1745 ====
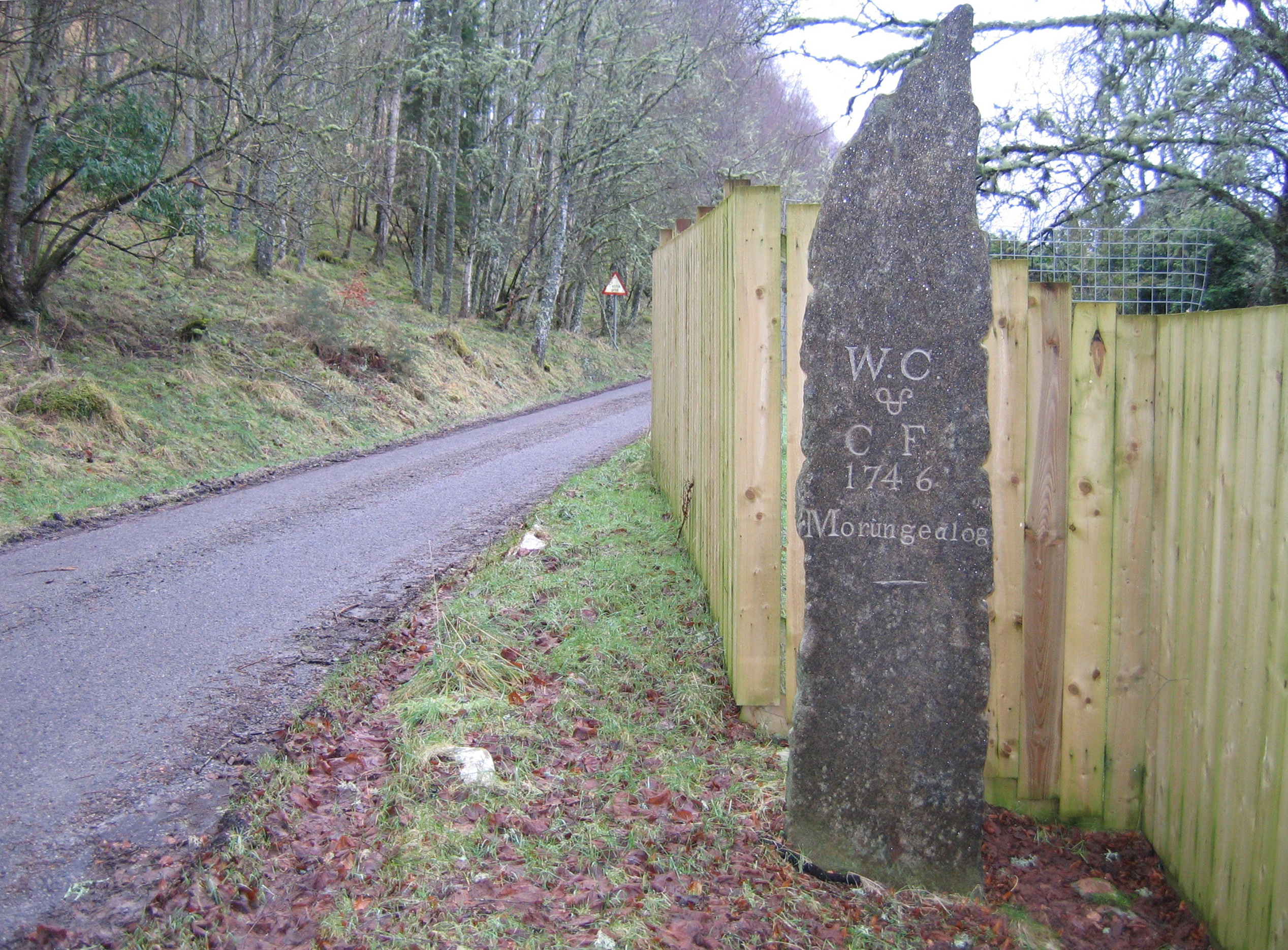
Memorial to William Chisholm of Strathglass, who fell at Culloden, and his wife, the war poetess Catriona Nic Fhearghais, at the site of their home, near Struy.

During the Jacobite rising of 1745, Roderick again supported the Jacobites. His youngest son, Roderick Og Chisholm led the clan at the Battle of Culloden, leading a very small regiment of about 80 clansmen, of which 30 were killed, including himself. One of the 14 Jacobite battle flags taken at Culloden, which were later burnt in Edinburgh, was a white linen banner of this regiment.

Two of Roderick's other sons James and John were Captains in the British army under the Duke of Cumberland.

== Clan seat ==
The seat of Clan Chisholm was originally at Comar Lodge and then at Erchless Castle, which was sold in 1937.

== Clan Chiefs ==
The present chief is Andrew Francis Hamish Chisholm of that Ilk, thirty-third Chief of Clan Chisholm.

The following is a list of some of the previous chiefs of Clan Chisholm.

No.	Name	Died	Notes
XXXIII	Andrew Francis Hamish Chisholm of Chisholm		Married Julie Dawn Greenacre.
XXXII	Alastair Hamish Wiland Andrew Fraser Chisholm of Chisholm	1997	Married Rosemary Yolanda Grant.
XXXI	Roderick Gooden-Chisholm, assumed the name Chisholm of Chisholm	1943	Married Margaret Chisholm Fraser of Culbokie and Guisachan.
XXX	Chisholm Gooden-Chisholm	1929	
XXIX	James Chisholm Gooden-Chisholm		Son of James Gooden and Mary Chisholm (daughter of the 23rd chief). Married Anne Elizabeth Lambert.
XXVIII	Roderick Donald Matheson Chisholm	1887	Obtained a Commission as Lieutenant in the 3rd Battalion Seaforth Highlanders.
XXVII	James Sutherland Chisholm	1885	Great-grandson of Alexander Chisholm of Muckerach, immediate younger brother of Roderick XXI chief. Died at Erchless Castle.
XXVI	Duncan MacDonell Chisholm	1858	Obtained a Commission in the Coldstream Guards. Succeeded by his cousin.
XXV	Alexander William Chisholm	1838	Member of Parliament for Inverness. Succeeded by his brother.
XXIV	William Chisholm	1817	Married Elizabeth, daughter of Duncan MacDonell XIV of Glengarry.
XXIII	Alexander Chisholm	1793	Known as the "fair-haired Chisholm". Succeeded by his brother.
XXII	Alexander Chisholm	1785	Married Elizabeth Mackenzie of Stewart.
XXI	Roderick Chisholm	1767	Led the Clan Chisholm at the Battle of Sherrifmuir in 1715 on the Jacobites side. His lands afterwards forfeited to the Crown.
XX	John Chisholm		Married Jane, daughter of Sir Roderick Mackenzie of Findon.
XIX	Alexander Chisholm		Sheriff-Deputy of the county of Inverness from 1689 to 1695. Married daughter of Roderick Mackenzie I of Applecross.
XVII	Alexander Chisholm		Married in 1639, his cousin, a daughter of Mackenzie V of Gairloch.
XVI	John Chisholm		In 1628 entered into a contract with Colin Mackenzie, 1st Earl of Seaforth, Simon Fraser, Lord Lovat, Hector Munro of Clynes, John Grant of Glenmoriston, John Bayne of Tulloch and others.
XV	Thomas Chisholm	1590	Died soon after his father, succeeded by his brother.
XIV	Alexander Chisholm	1590	Married Janet McKenzie, daughter of Kenneth Mackenzie, 10th of Kintail, chief of Clan Mackenzie.
XIII	John Chisholm		In 1542 received remission for all past offences from King James V of Scotland.
XII	Wiland de Chisholm	1512	First to spell the name without an "e". Laid siege to Urquhart Castle. Owned the estates of Comar and Erchless.
XI	Wiland de Chisholme		Described as "of Comar". Given a commission by George, Earl of Huntly to attack the Clan Mackenzie for the killing of Harold Chisholm.
X	Alexander de Chisholme	1432	Described as "Lord of Kinrossy" in a deed dated at Elgin on 9 August 1422. Succeeded by his brother.
IX	Thomas de Chisholme		Married Margaret, daughter of Lachlan Mackintosh, VIII chief of Clan Mackintosh.
VIII	Alexander de Chisholme		Married Margaret, Lady of Erchless.
VII	Sir John de Chisholme		Received lands of Lower Kinmylies, near Inverness from Alexander of the Isles. Married Cathrine Bisset. Succeeded by his brother.
VI	Sir Robert de Chisholme		Constable of Urquhart Castle and Sheriff of Inverness. Married Margaret, daughter of Haliburton of that Ilk.
V	Sir Robert de Chisholme		Fought and was taken prisoner at the Battle of Neville's Cross in 1346. Married Anne, daughter of Sir Robert Lauder.
IV	Alexander de Chisholme		Described as "Lord of Chisholme in Roxburgh and Paxtoun in Berwickshire".
III	Sir John de Chesholme		Designated Del Counte de Berwyke. Found in the Ragman's Rolls of Edward I of England in 1296 but later joined Robert the Bruce of Scotland and fought at the Battle of Bannockburn in 1314.
II	Richard de Chisholme		Described as Del Counte of Roxburgh
I	John de Chisholme		Named in bull of Pope Alexander IV in 1254. Granted lands in the county of Berwick.

== See also ==
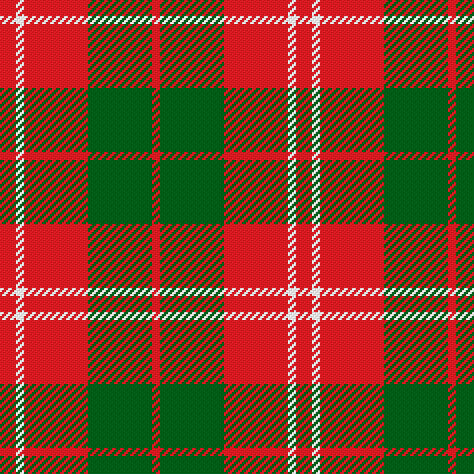
Clan Chisholm Tartan.

- Carn Eige, Mam Sodhail and Glen Affric, parts of the former Highland Chisholm lands.
- Chisholm (disambiguation)
