= Gavin Maxwell =

Scottish natural historian and author (1914–1969)

- Born: 15 July 1914; House of Elrig, Wigtownshire, Scotland
- Died: 7 September 1969 (aged 55); Inverness, Scotland
- Resting place: Sandaig, Scotland
- Education: Hertford College, Oxford
- Occupation: Author
- Writing career
- Period: 1933–1937
- Genres: Natural history, Travel literature
- Notable work: Ring of Bright Water

Gavin Maxwell FRSL FZS FRGS (15 July 1914 – 7 September 1969) was a Scottish naturalist and author, best known for his non-fiction writing and his work with otters. He became most famous for Ring of Bright Water (1960), which described his experiences raising otters from Iraq and West Africa on the west coast of Scotland. Ring of Bright Water sold more than two million copies, and was made into a film starring Bill Travers and Virginia McKenna in 1969. One of his otters from Iraq was of a previously unknown sub-species, which was subsequently named after Maxwell. His other books described shark hunting in the Hebrides, his childhood, and his travels in Sicily, Iraq and North Africa.

== Early life ==
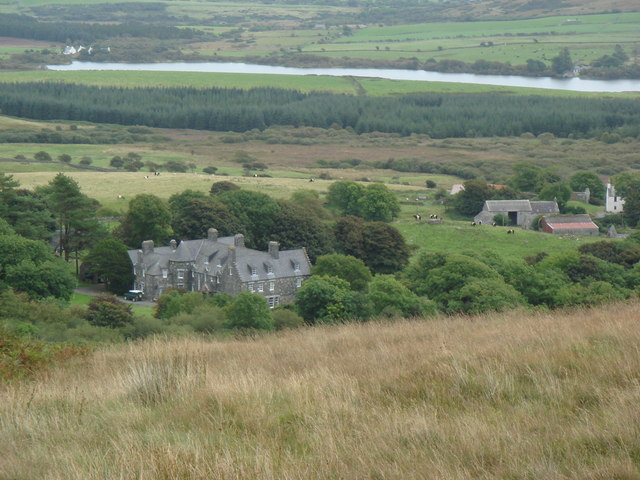
The "House of Elrig" – Gavin Maxwell's childhood home. Arylick farm to right and Elrig Loch in the background.

Maxwell was born on 15 July 1914 at the House of Elrig, near the small village of Elrig, Port William, in Wigtownshire, now Dumfries and Galloway, Scotland. Maxwell's relatives lived in the area until the death of his nephew, Sir Michael Maxwell, 9th Baronet, in 2021. The family's ancient estate and grounds were associated with nearby Monreith House. Maxwell wrote about his childhood in the book House of Elrig.

Gavin Maxwell was the youngest child of Lieutenant-Colonel Aymer Edward Maxwell and Lady Mary Percy, the fifth daughter of the 7th Duke of Northumberland. The couple married in London in 1909. Gavin had three siblings: a sister, Christian Maxwell (1910–1980), and two brothers — Aymer Maxwell (1911–1987), who succeeded as Sir Aymer Maxwell, 8th Baronet, in 1937, and Eustace Maxwell (1913–1971). His paternal grandfather, Sir Herbert Maxwell, 7th Baronet, was a distinguished antiquarian, politician, painter, writer and natural historian.

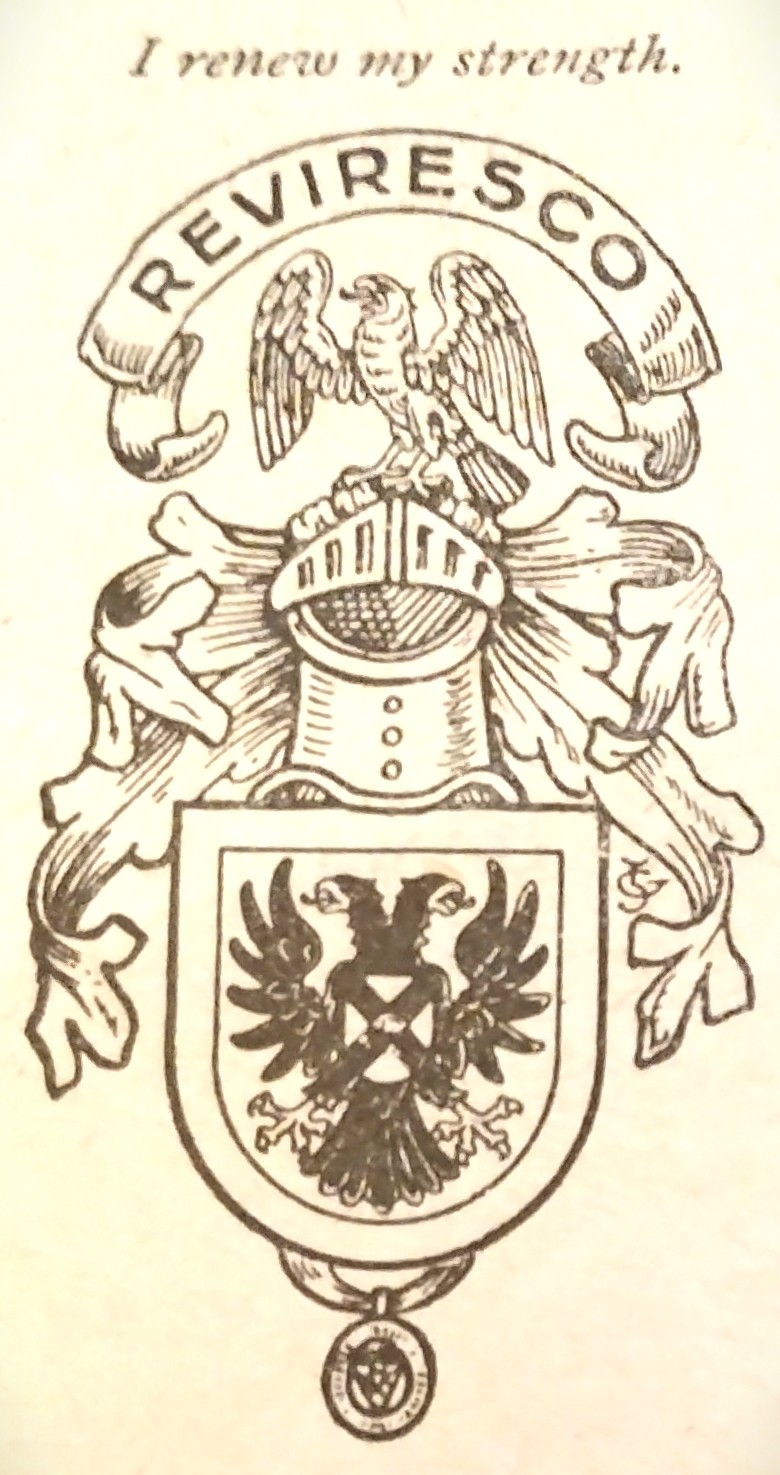
Coat of arms for the Maxwells of Monreith

Maxwell's father was killed before Gavin was three months old. Lt Col Aymer Maxwell, who previously served the British Army in the Lovat Scouts and Grenadier Guards, was redeployed to lead the Collingwood Battalion of the Royal Naval Division against the Imperial German Army in the Siege of Antwerp on 6 October 1914. He was hit by a shell two days after his arrival, and died from his injuries the next day, 9 October 1914, and the day before Antwerp capitulated to the German invasion. Lt Col Aymer Maxwell was buried in Schoonselhof cemetery.

The Maxwell children were brought up by Lady Mary Maxwell, who never remarried and was thus widowed for over 50 years. Gavin lacked a father figure, but had three unmarried aunts, who had a continual presence in his childhood.

Maxwell, with this two brothers, developed a passion for natural history from early childhood, encouraged partly by his grandfather Herbert Maxwell, but more so by aunt Lady Muriel Percy. He was composing nature notes from the age of 5. He had an assortment of pet birds - jackdaw, heron, owl - and avidly read books relating to animals. Aunt Muriel converted his father's gun-room into a natural history classroom. The three boys would explore the area around Elrig, collecting specimens. In Gavin's case he focused on bird's eggs, butterflies and moths. From early years, Gavin developed a better relationship with his eldest brother Aymer than with Eustace or Christian, starting with their shared natural history collection but leading on to a shared outlook on life. He described themselves as being like twins, unable to be actively happy without the other.

=== Catholic Apostolic Church and later views on religion ===
Gavin Maxwell was brought up in the Catholic Apostolic Church (CAC), of which his mother, deceased father, and aunts were dedicated supporters. In doctrine the CAC was generally close to the Church of England, but the CAC was distinguished by the premillennialist belief in an imminent Second Coming of the Messiah, the gifts of prophecy and speaking in tongues. At one stage he lived in the house next to the Apostles' Chapel, the CAC's main church, which is still retained in preparation for the Second Coming. Gavin Maxwell noted the impression that this religious fervour had on his childhood, during Sunday church services which could last four hours.

Later in life, his views on organised religion became apparent when he highlighted corruption within the Roman Catholic Church and the clergy in Sicily, through his book The Ten Pains of Death. His friend Marjorie Linklater wrote to Maxwell to complain about this portrayal, and he replied that he did not believe in a "conceptual religion" or its rituals.

=== Education, illness and relationship with mother ===
Maxwell did not go to school until he was 10 years old. At that point he had hardly met another child outside of his own family. Maxwell's education took place at a succession of preparatory and public schools, starting with the sporty Heddon Court School, East Barnet; then St Cyprian's School, Eastbourne, where he found encouragement for his interest in natural history but made him so miserable that he left mid-term; Hurst Court School in Ore, which he liked; and finally Stowe School. Later in life he stayed in regular contact with Stowe, sponsoring a creative writing prize there. One winner in 1966 was a 15 year old Sir Richard Branson, who consequently became acquainted with Maxwell and credits Maxwell with helping his career.

On his 16th birthday, Maxwell fell ill with Henoch's purpura, now known as Henoch-Schönlein purpura (HSP). This auto-immune disease usually resolves in a few weeks without complications, but in Maxwell's case it came close to killing him. The King's Physician was summoned, who provided no optimism for his fee of 50 guineas (£52.50) equivalent to £2,967 in 2025, and Maxwell was given the Last Sacrament by one of the few remaining CAC priests.

His mother, Lady Mary Maxwell, to whom he was particularly close, nursed him back to health, with two years of convalescence at Albury, Surrey, an estate owned by her father, the 7th Duke of Northumberland and where the Maxwell family would traditionally spend winters. Twenty five years later, Gavin Maxwell wrote A Reed Shaken by the Wind, describing his time with the Marsh Arabs. The front dedication page is blank, apart from the following text: "For M.M. Τροφεία". The last word, tropheia, in Classical Greek means the wages paid to a nurse, particularly of a child. But it is also a metalepsis, a metaphor for the perpetual debt a child owes to their parents for their efforts in raising the child to adulthood.

This characterised an enduring bond between mother and her youngest child, to the point of him being, in Gavin Maxwell's words, "suffocated by love". She provided significant financial support to Maxwell throughout her life, funding many of his projects. After Gavin Maxwell left the army, Lady Mary's London residence was close to Maxwell's various homes, and they frequently visited each other until she died in 1965. Lady Mary was buried in St Peter's and St Paul's Church, 150 metres from Lower Northfield, their main Albury home, in the same Anglican graveyard as most of the Apostles and other leaders of the Catholic Apostolic Church, a place sometimes dubbed "Resurrection Corner".

== University, wartime and early years as artist ==
=== Oxford University and first expedition ===
During the two years that Maxwell was ill, he was taken out of the school system, but he received tuition from private tutors. This allowed him to obtain the School Certificate, the examination that would facilitate entry into university. In Raven Seek Thy Brother, Maxwell relates how family pressure led him to take a degree in Estate Management at Hertford College, Oxford from 1933 to 1937, when as the family's youngest son he was never destined to manage an estate, and for which he had no interest either. Instead he spent much of his university time pursuing sporting and leisure activities, particularly game shooting, instead of studying. He cheated his way through the first year exams but scraped though the final examinations honestly, albeit with a Third Class degree, having crammed the entire three-year course in six weeks.

After leaving Oxford, Maxwell spent a brief and unhappy period as an agricultural equipment salesman, and then tried his hand at journalism for publications such as The Field.

In June 1938, at the suggestion of Sir Peter Scott, Gavin Maxwell went on his first and solo natural history expedition. He went to Vadsø, East Finnmark to study the migration and breeding patterns of Steller's eider, a small Arctic sea duck, that can be found around Varangerfjord. He also studied the Lesser white-fronted goose, which was later to be one of the visitors to Scott's wildlife reserve in Slimbridge. He made a second visit to Vadsø in June 1939, at that time a remote and difficult to reach part of Norway, but returned early, with the onset of World War II. These expeditions were Maxwell's first forays into the future life to which he aspired, though he did not write about this experience at length: there is just a single page in Raven Seek thy Brother.

=== Wartime service ===
Maxwell joined the Scots Guards on 2 September 1939, the day after the German invasion of Poland at the start of World War II. Initially he was assigned to their training depots around London and Surrey. He suffered from bouts of ill health, including a series of duodenal ulcer attacks, which reduced his operational usefulness.

Maxwell was seconded in September 1941 to the Special Operations Executive (SOE) but fractured an ankle in a parachute training exercise from a captive balloon: he was so paralysed by fear that he forgot his training, and landed on straight legs rather than buckling on to the floor. As a result from January 1942 he served as an SOE instructor, rather than being deployed on operations. His activities took place at a series of bases around the Isle of Skye, Arisaig and Knoydart, which began his involvement with this area of the Scottish Highlands.

His task was training SOE agents, many drawn from Resistance groups from mainland Europe, in the use of small arms warfare. He was promoted to the rank of Acting Major in 1943 to supervise three SOE training locations around Arisaig. In November 1944, when it was clear that SOE's wartime endeavours were coming to a close, he applied to be invalided out of the Army. This was granted with effect of 24 February 1945, and with the honorific rank of Major.

One of the curious aspects about Maxwell's personality, normally resistant to being made to follow orders and disciplined rituals, was how well he adapted to army and SOE life. He was given a purposeful role, for which he was well suited, often enjoyed, and the SOE was a part of the military war effort that was more tolerant of unusual personalities. It was the only period of relatively conventional employment that was an unalloyed success for Maxwell.

=== Shark fishing from Soay 1945-1948 ===
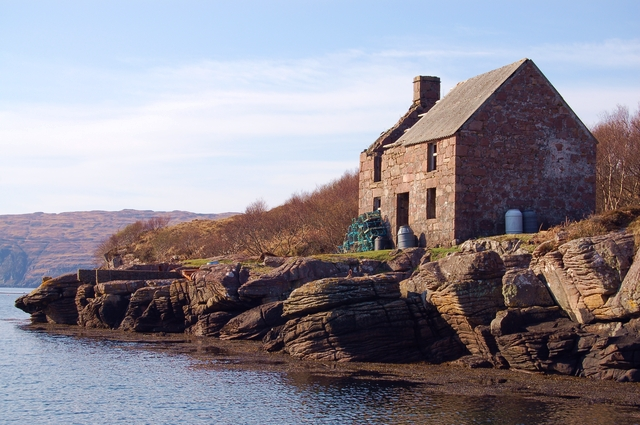
Former HQ of The Island of Soay Shark Fisheries Ltd, started by Maxwell

In 1943 Maxwell borrowed a yacht used by the SOE to make his first visit to the island of Soay off Skye, and fell in love with the place that he called his Avalon. The following year he became the landowner of Soay, purchased for £900, thanks to a loan from his mother.

In 1945 he borrowed a further £11,000 from his mother (equivalent to £410,000 in 2025) and £5,000 from friends to start up a basking shark fishing business - The Island of Soay Shark Fisheries Ltd. Squalene, an oil made by the fish's liver, was at that time selling at between £50 and £100 a ton, and each basking shark landed could theoretically produce half a ton of oil. The season lasted 8 months of the year, and at best Maxwell could fish 3 sharks a week, 83 in a season, and close to the capacity of the small Soay factory where the squalene would be harvested. At which point the economic reality would readily show the implausibility of this business, since it would require far more sharks to be landed to cover the substantial operating and implied capital costs.

Maxwell acknowledged in his book Harpoon at a Venture (1952) that poor planning and the lack of financial support meant that by 1948 his attempt to establish a fishery was proven to be commercially unsuccessful. When the money started to run out, in July 1948, he resigned from the Soay company, which was wound up nearly a year later, with the island eventually sold to his business partner, Tex Geddes and his wife. Maxwell moved to a flat within Glenapp Castle, Ballantrae, a guest of Lord Inchcape.

=== Start of an artistic career ===
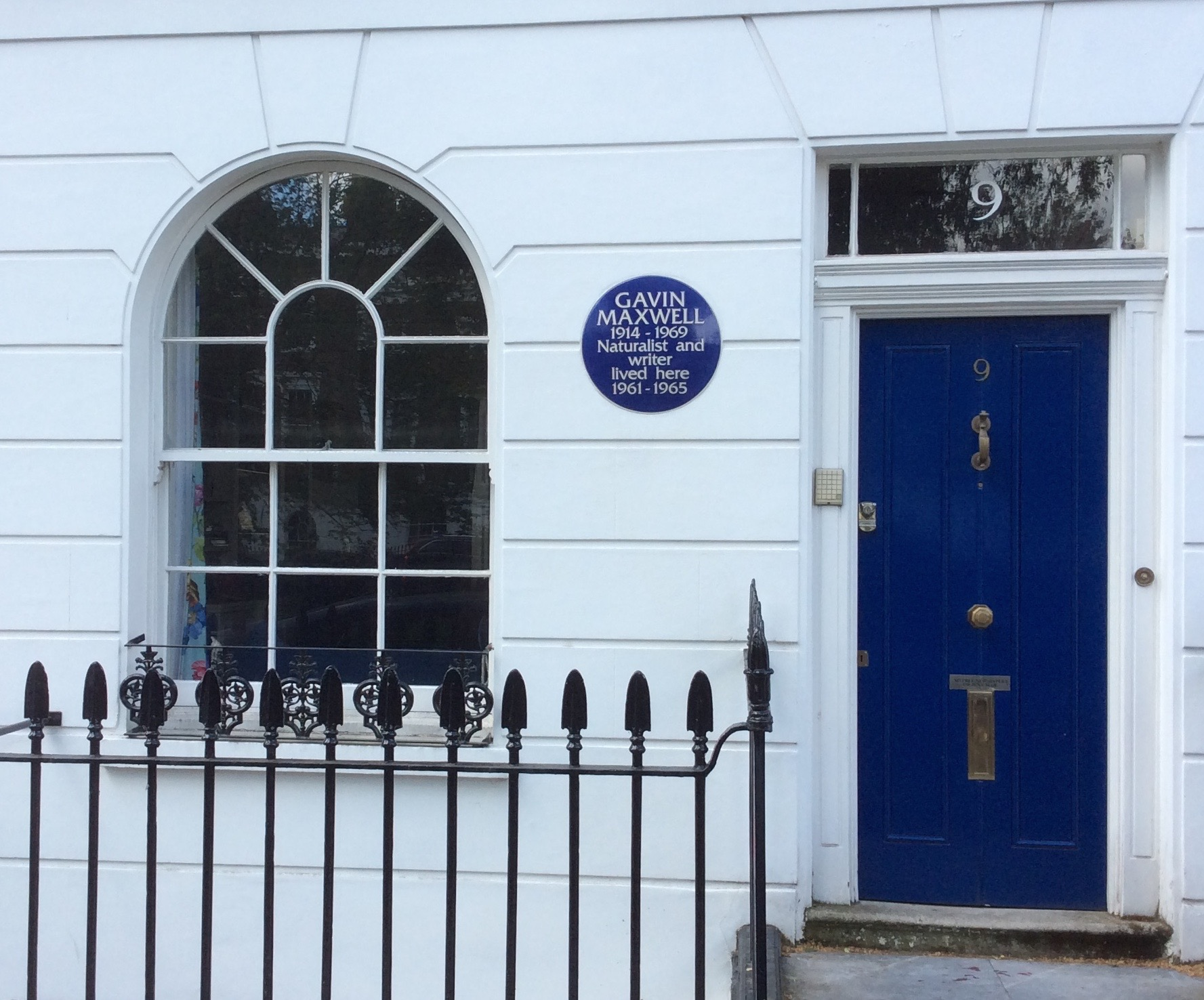
A blue plaque commemorating Maxwell as a writer and naturalist at the house where he lived in Paultons Square in Chelsea, London

Living in London from 1949, Maxwell took up portrait painting as a profession, and as a necessity, given his debts from the failed Soay enterprise. He had started painting at school, and attended classes at Ruskin School of Art while he was at Oxford. He then self-taught and practised commissions during his time in Glenapp. He only had limited success as a society portrait painter, and largely stopped after the publication of his first book, Harpoon at a Venture, in 1952. But even 15 years later he would sometimes describe himself as a portrait painter. Artwork featured prominently in all of his homes, some of which is preserved in Eilean Bàn.

He resumed writing poetry in earnest from 1949, something he started at school and continued through his time in the army. He soon became involved with a circle of artists, including Meary James Thurairajah Tambimuttu. Tambimuttu in turn introduced Maxwell to Kathleen Raine in August 1949, and which led to a complex, intermittent but lifelong friendship. After an introduction by his older brother, Sir Aymer Maxwell, Gavin Maxwell and Kathleen Raine soon became friends of British-Swiss Nobel Prize winner Elias Canetti, who advised both of them in navigating the emotional difficulties that regularly surfaced between the author and the poet.

== Literary career ==
Maxwell's first book, Harpoon at a Venture, was published on 26 May 1952 and was well received. Maxwell conceived a follow-up project to go to Sicily, initially in the quest for an alleged distantly related renegade aunt who had fled there. He persuaded the publisher Burns & Oates to advance him £500 in late 1952 but with no book emerging from his first visit to Sicily, this turned into a considerable liability for Maxwell. In March 1954 he met Mark Longman, the last of the founding family to run the Longman publishing company. They developed a good personal rapport, and Longman published most of Maxwell's future books. Longman agreed to advance Maxwell £1,000 for two books on Sicily, which allowed him to pay off the Burns & Oates advance.

In 1957 Maxwell signed up with literary agent Peter Janson-Smith, who was also agent for James Bond author Ian Fleming. Maxwell had shared a nanny with Ian and Peter Fleming, some 30 years previously, one of a number of uncanny overlaps. Janson-Smith was Maxwell's agent until his death, and beyond: he was one of Maxwell's literary trustees. He became a source of financial and emotional support to Maxwell, whose repeated temper tantrums and insistent financial demands made him a difficult author to manage.

In addition to the books, Gavin Maxwell did regular reviews, mainly of new books related to nature, for The Observer newspaper. This was a vital, if limited, source of income, particularly in the late 1960s.

Maxwell maintained a home in London from 1957 to 1965 at number 9 Paultons Square in London. This was the home of Kathleen Raine, who rented out the ground floor and basement to Maxwell: she initially retained the top floor as a separate flat. The property has a Blue Plaque marking Maxwell's time there.

=== Sicily ===
The two publishers' advances allowed Maxwell to make several visits to Sicily from late 1952 to 1954. From this emerged two books, God Protect me from my Friends in 1956 (Maxwell's version of the Gabriel Sénac de Meilhan quotation was "I can look after my enemies, but God protect me from my friends"); and then The Ten Pains of Death in 1959. The first book was a mixture of travelogue and investigative reportage, relating to the violent death of Salvatore Giuliano. The Ten Pains of Death was a broader set of essays and interviews about the Sicilian way of life and in particular the experience of poverty.

Maxwell's time in Sicily had a devastating aftermath, as a result of libel cases brought by two Italian politicians. The first case was brought to the Italian courts by Bernardo Mattarella in 1958; the other, in 1965, by Giovanni Francesco Alliata, Prince of Montereale, through the English courts. Both plaintiffs said that Maxwell had libelled them in three pages of God Protect me from my Friends, where Maxwell suggested that the politicians were Salvatore Giuliano's paymasters and were implicated in the 1947 May Day massacre at a Communist Party rally.

Maxwell lost both cases. In the Mattarella case Maxwell had to pay a fine of £3,000, equivalent to more than £60,000 in 2025 values. He also got an 8 month prison sentence, which he did not serve: Maxwell benefited from a government amnesty the following year. In the 1965 trial, Prince Alliata was awarded £400 by the High Court of Justice jury, but the judge, Hildreth Glyn-Jones, awarded costs against Maxwell and his publishers Longman, and these were in excess of £10,000, equivalent to £170,000 in 2025. These were crushing financial blows to Maxwell, who was quoted as saying about the judge: "I walked out of the court knowing that it would be years, if ever, before I could repay my share. I hope I shall meet his Lordship in an after life - if we are heading in the same direction."

=== Iraq ===
In January 1956, Maxwell went to Iraq and toured the reed marshes of the Euphrates with explorer Wilfred Thesiger, Maxwell's future wife's first cousin, once removed. Maxwell spent February and March 1956 on a tarada, a 12 metres long, 1 metre wide traditional canoe. These seven weeks were to have an important bearing on the rest of Maxwell's life. The experience of travelling with Thesiger was physically and mentally painful, with Maxwell required to sit cross-legged for hour after hour, and once it was over Maxwell decided he would not repeat the experience. Maxwell greatly admired Thesiger for his masterly abilities as an explorer, but Maxwell was very much constrained as the junior member of the expedition, and made uncomfortable by Thesiger's authoritarian aloofness. Thesiger certainly had his doubts about Maxwell: their personalities were very different, but he was impressed by Maxwell's ornithological and hunting abilities.

Iraq was where Maxwell first encountered otters. One unweaned otter was presented to Maxwell on the tarada, but Maxwell was devastated when it died under his stewardship. Thesiger at the time seemed to be uncaring about the otter's death. But in April 1956, when the boat expedition was over and Maxwell was in Basra preparing for his return to Britain, Thesiger arranged for a recently weaned dog (male) otter to be sent to Maxwell. Maxwell named him Mijbil, often Mij, and his subspecies was eventually named after Maxwell. Maxwell was immediately and completely enthralled by his new companion, who returned the affection, and man and otter were to develop an extraordinary bond. Maxwell and Mijbil made the arduous and risky journey from Basra back to his small flat in London.

While in Basra, Maxwell encountered Gavin Young for the first time. Though he was fourteen years younger than Maxwell, Young hailed from a family of intrepid merchants, was the more experienced traveller and had known Thesiger for longer. The two Gavins were to become close friends, though Young often struggled with aspects of Maxwell's personality. Maxwell's account of his time in Iraq appears in A Reed Shaken By The Wind, later published in the United States under the title People of the Reeds. This book won the 1957 Heinemann prize and was hailed by The New York Times as "near perfect". Maxwell, Thesiger and Young were the triumvirate of post 1945 British explorers that wrote about the now largely vanished culture of the Marsh Arabs, and of these Maxwell's book arguably got the better reviews, including from Harold Nicolson and Cyril Connolly.

=== Camusfeàrna ===
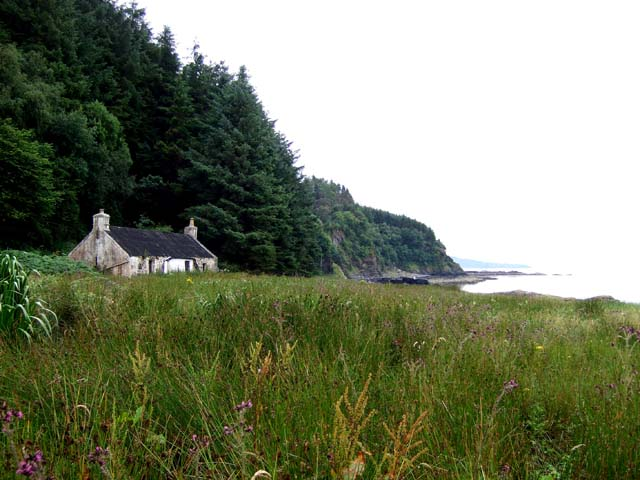
The surviving cottage at Sandaig, next to Maxwell's former home, April 2009. "Derelict bothy at Sandaig", by Nick Ray, licensed under CC-BY-SA-2.0

From 1948 Maxwell had been using a remote, at that stage off-grid, cottage, on a peppercorn rent in Sandaig, a house which had been a croft and home to the local lighthouse keeper of the Sandaig Light, southwest of Glenelg. There was one other cottage there, which still remains, and they were opposite Isleornsay over on Skye, with a parallel lighthouse, marking the shipping channel through the Sound of Sleat and the entrance to Loch Hourn. He initially used this house as an occasional writer's retreat, but after Maxwell acquired his otters it became his main home. In his books he called the location Camusfeàrna, Gaelic for Bay of Alders.

==== Ring of Bright Water ====
Ring of Bright Water was Maxwell's best selling book. It remains in print, has sold over two million copies and was translated into more languages than any other book by Maxwell. It was an autobiographical account of Maxwell's time with his otters at Camusfeàrna. The quality of Maxwell's writing brought him a critically acclaimed reputation as a descriptive author, as well as a brief respite from his financial troubles. At different times in 1960-1961 it was briefly the best selling non-fiction book in the UK, Commonwealth and USA. There were four follow up books: The Otters' Tale (1962), similar to Ring but rewritten with children in mind; The Rocks Remain (1963); Raven Seek thy Brother (1969); and The Ring of Bright Water Trilogy (2001). The first three were written by Maxwell, the trilogy was devised and edited after his death.

The film was released in 1969, close to Maxwell's death, and starred Bill Travers and Virginia McKenna. Maxwell was deeply unhappy with the original script, which preserved little of the original book, and in particular that his own character was turned into a disillusioned civil servant. But he was impressed by director Jack Couffer after meeting him at Sandaig, and ended up admiring the film's narrative.The film's world premiere screening was shown at the Odeon Leicester Square, London on 2 April 1969, with Prince Philip, Duke of Edinburgh, who knew Maxwell, in attendance. Maxwell felt unable to go to this event, a combination of his escalating ill health and a painful shyness towards large groups. He did later introduce the film at other cinemas in Scotland.

It was soon after the book's publication that he met the young Terry Nutkins, who after working for Maxwell as an otter-keeper later became a children's television presenter. After the publishing success of Ring of Bright Water (1960), his newfound fame did not sit well with him:

He couldn't cope with it. He wasn't a strong man that way, so he couldn't deal with it. But he didn't want anyone to know that, so he started drinking more; he started smoking more. And the pressures became more because we started spending more money. Next thing, agent was on the phone: 'We're broke; we need a sequel.' So, he wrote The Rocks Remain, the sequel to Ring of Bright Water, which was a disaster because it was written in a hurry. It didn't have the same beauty, it didn't have the same anything as Ring of Bright Water. That was the beginning of the end really. — Terry Nutkins, 2010

In The Rocks Remain (1963), the otters Edal, Teko, Mossy and Monday show great differences in personality. The book demonstrates the difficulty Maxwell was having, possibly as a result of his mental state, in remaining focused on one project and the impact that had on his otters, Sandaig and his own life.

After his mother's death in March 1965, Maxwell felt able to publish The House of Elrig in October 1965. Here Maxwell describes his family history and his passion for the wildlife of Galloway, where he was born.

In the early hours of Sunday 21 January 1968, Maxwell's Sandaig home was destroyed by fire, in which Edal perished and the author lost almost all of his possessions.

=== North Africa ===
In 1960–1962, he made several trips to Morocco and Algeria. He published accounts of his experiences in North Africa, including his description of the aftermath of the 1960 Agadir earthquake, in The Rocks Remain (1963). In Morocco, he was assisted by the monarchy's head of Press Services and Minister of Information Moulay Ahmed Alaoui, and by the anticolonial activist and journalist Margaret Pope, who Maxwell referred to in The Rocks Remain under a pseudonym, "Prudence Hazell." Pope recruited Maxwell to travel to Algiers in January 1961 to collect information for the Algerian revolutionary National Liberation Front (FLN). Maxwell also began research for a non-fiction book tracing the dramatic lives of the last rulers of Marrakech under the French, eventually published in 1966 as Lords of the Atlas: The Rise and Fall of the House of Glaoua 1893–1956. During the Moroccan Years of Lead, the regime there considered his book subversive and banned its importation.

=== Eilean Bàn ===
After losing his Sandaig home, Maxwell moved to the lighthouse keepers' cottages on Eilean Bàn (White Island), an island between the Isle of Skye and the Scottish mainland by the village of Kyleakin. Maxwell referred to his new home as Kyleakin Lighthouse. He invited John Lister-Kaye to join him on Eilean Bàn to help him build a zoo on the island and work on a book about British wild mammals. Lister-Kaye accepted the invitation, but both projects were abandoned with Maxwell's death in September 1969.

== Gavin Maxwell's friendship with Kathleen Raine ==
The title of Maxwell's book Ring of Bright Water was taken from the poem The Marriage of Psyche published in 1952 by Kathleen Raine. After their first meeting in August 1949, Maxwell and Raine developed a deep friendship, initially over their shared appreciation of Northumberland. In Raine's case, however, this led to an intense love that Maxwell could not reciprocate, telling her that he was homosexual. Raine had a significant impact on Maxwell's literary career: she introduced Maxwell to her close friend Janet Adam Smith, who arranged Maxwell's poems to be published in the New Statesman in January 1950; then in November 1950 she introduced him to the publisher Rupert Hart-Davis, which led to Maxwell's first book Harpoon at a Venture. From 1957 to 1960 Raine and Maxwell lived in separate flats within the same building in Paultons Square.

The Lion's Mouth was Raine's memoir of the relationship, that she first started writing in 1962 but published in 1977. Raine's love for Maxwell was all consuming, sometimes obsessive and mostly one-sided. Maxwell was in awe of her intellect, at times valued their friendship but on other occasions would express his frustration and anger towards Raine. For this she blamed only herself, despite the fact that Maxwell was entirely capable of creating his own calamities. The relationship was pitted by many arguments, with frequent reconciliations initiated by Raine, who was six years older than Maxwell and a twice divorced mother of two teenage children.

=== The Curse ===
A pivotal event occurred in July 1956 at Sandaig. After a fierce argument with Maxwell, witnessed by his embarrassed guest Gavin Young, Raine was ejected into a stormy night. Frustrated by Maxwell's homosexuality and mood swings, she returned later that night, grasped the rowan tree, near his home, and uttered a curse: “Let Gavin suffer, in this place, as I am suffering now.” She came to believe that this curse marked the beginning of Maxwell’s tragic misfortunes, starting with the death of his beloved otter Mijbil in 1957, for which she was indirectly responsible, and ending with the cancer that took his life in 1969.

In November 1961 Maxwell told Raine of his plan to marry Lavinia Renton. This deeply hurt Raine, with Maxwell seemingly prepared to commit to a relationship with another woman. On the wedding day in February 1962, she saw Maxwell and his bride drive off to church, and compared it to a marriage hearse. The day after Maxwell's marriage Raine left Southampton on the RMS Queen Mary, to present the A. W. Mellon Lectures in the Fine Arts in Washington D.C., and breaking off contact with Maxwell. By coincidence she discovered that Gavin Young was on the same ship, to take up his new role as The Observer's New York correspondent.

They next met in July 1966 in Greece, where Raine was staying close to his brother's home. Unexpectedly invited to lunch by Maxwell, Raine handed him a draft of The Lion’s Mouth. Afterwards Maxwell was shocked to discover the details of the 1956 curse and reacted angrily. Days later, they met up for a second time in Greece, where he denounced her and their friendship in the strongest terms. In 1968, after the Sandaig fire that killed his otter Edal, Maxwell wrote an acerbic letter to Raine, who used to refer to him affectionately as her "silver stag": "Whether or not your curse has been responsible for this terrible disaster I don't know or should never know. If it was, I can only say God forgive you... Your Silver Stag has indeed fallen - as you willed - and possibly beyond recall. If you really believe in your own powers of destruction you must consider yourself to have been successful at least twice."

=== Impact of Raven Seek thy Brother ===
Maxwell acknowledged the curse's profound impact, and he made his anger public, in the opening pages of Raven Seek thy Brother, where Raine was only referred to as "a poetess". Maxwell's original manuscript had a harsher version of the curse: "Let him, and the house and all that have to do with it suffer here as I am suffering, for as long as he shall live." Maxwell only learned the details of the curse through Raine's memoir in 1966, so this wording was his own confection. Raine objected robustly and he revised it before publication to match more closely her original words: "Let him suffer here, as I am suffering." Maxwell’s portrayal infuriated Raine’s father, who considered suing for libel. Biographer Douglas Botting remarked that Maxwell “publicly pilloried” Raine, straining her ties with Maxwell’s other friends.

They remained in sporadic contact, including Raine's telegram of sympathy to Maxwell after the fire at Sandaig. She twice visited Maxwell in Eilean Bàn. Her final visit on 2 May 1969 resulted in another argument, regarding Maxwell's inability to recognise Raine's contribution to his literary legacy. The poem Marriage of Psyche is reproduced prominently at the front of Ring of Bright Water, but not credited to Raine. The poem is essentially a love poem from Raine to Maxwell, but he transposed the poem towards the otters and Sandaig. Instead Raine is mentioned, along with other names, in an inaccurate acknowledgement of copyright permissions. In the film version, released the previous month, there was no such acknowledgement. This omission continues to the present: the audiobook of Ring of Bright Water starts with a full reading of Marriage of Psyche by David Rintoul, with the title misstated and Raine uncredited.

=== Reconciliation ===
Maxwell's final letter to Raine in August 1969 expressed reconciliation, making her aware of his likely imminent death, and he invited Raine to accompany him in spirit. In her tender reply she said: "I have never been able to say how much I love you - but surely you know." Raine participated in the funeral events at Sandaig and London. In his will Maxwell bequeathed her a tie pin, from the Order of the Garter, that he frequently wore, and which was originally awarded to Maxwell's great-grandfather George Campbell. Three years later, Raine met up with the Spiritualist psychic medium Ena Twigg, in an attempt to have a séance with Gavin Maxwell's spirit.

== Death and legacy ==
=== Death ===
From June 1969, Maxwell started to complain about persistent headaches and other ailments, and he became increasingly debilitated into the summer of 1969. Initial medical checks were inconclusive. By August 1969 Maxwell was in considerable discomfort and he was taken to hospital in Inverness. On 18 August Maxwell was given a diagnosis of late stage lung cancer. His doctors suggested he would have perhaps six months to live, but his health then declined rapidly, though he remained lucid throughout. Gavin Maxwell died at 04:30 on the morning of Sunday 7 September 1969, three weeks after the confirmed diagnosis, at the Royal Northern Infirmary, Inverness. He was 55 years old. The direct cause of death was coronary thrombosis leading to cardiac arrest. He was a heavy smoker for all of his adult life, sometimes 80 cigarettes a day. Many photographs of Maxwell show him smoking or with a cigarette nearby.

During his last weeks, knowing that death was imminent, Maxwell wrote letters to some of his friends to let them know the prognosis, including one to Kathleen Raine. He arranged to clear his debts and planned his funeral. He rewrote his will, naming his longest serving otter keeper, Jimmy Watt, as his sole heir, excepting a few bequests. Raef Payne and his agent, Peter Janson-Smith, were appointed as his literary trustees and executors. His estate was valued for inventory purposes at £8,448 in April 1970, equivalent to approximately £125,000 in 2025 real terms. Royalties from Maxwell's books will continue to flow to Maxwell's estate until 2039, under UK copyright laws. In his will Maxwell expressed the wish that his home on Eilean Bàn would be turned into a wildlife park, but given the state of his finances, this wasn't taken forward and the house was sold to one of his friends.

=== Funeral ===
In line with his wishes, Maxwell was cremated in Aberdeen shortly after death. Later his ashes were deposited under a boulder, placed on the site of his writing desk, in Sandaig on Thursday 18 September 1969, in an informal outdoor ceremony attended by relatives, local residents and friends. Kathleen Raine was among those present. On 24 September 1969 there was a church memorial service, arranged by Peter Janson-Smith and Paul Longman, at St Paul's, Covent Garden in London. Bill Travers and Virginia McKenna were in the congregation.

=== Memorials ===
Eilean Bàn now supports a pier of the Skye Bridge, built during the 1990s. Despite modern traffic a hundred feet or so above it, the island is a commemorative wildlife sanctuary as well as a museum dedicated to Maxwell, located inside his final home. It is open to the public from spring through to autumn. Another memorial is a bronze otter sculpture by Penny Wheatley, commissioned in 1978 by the Galloway Wildlife Trust, at Glasserton, Monreith, near to St Medan's Golf Club and overlooking Luce Bay. There is a plaque on the side - also found at Eileen Bàn - with the words "Gavin Maxwell 1914-1969, author and naturalist, haec loca puer amavit, vir celebravit" which from Latin can be translated as "This place he loved as a boy, made famous as a man".

== Personal life ==
Though privately he described himself as homosexual, Maxwell married Lavinia Renton (later known as Lavinia Hankinson, 1923–2020), the daughter of Sir Alan Lascelles and granddaughter of Viscount Chelmsford, Wilfred Thesiger's uncle, on 1 February 1962. The marriage lasted little more than a year and they divorced in 1964. He had previously been in a brief relationship with Clement Glock (née Hale, 1913–1955), head of the scene painting at the Royal Opera House, who he met in autumn 1949. Later in 1949, Glock met Maxwell's older brother Aymer (who was also homosexual), to whom she switched her affections.

According to Douglas Botting, Maxwell may have suffered from bipolar disorder. Though this was not a confirmed diagnosis, the credits to Botting's biography makes clear that he undertook research with medical professionals, some of whom knew Maxwell personally.

== Public service and recognition ==
- MA (Oxon): Bachelor of Arts in Estate Management when upgraded to MA after graduation.
- Major: Scots Guards. This was Maxwell's honorific rank on discharge from the Army in 1945, he was Acting Major from 1943.
- Fellow: Zoological Society of London (FZS): Maxwell was a Scientific Fellow from 1940.
- Fellow: Royal Geographical Society (FRGS).
- Fellow: American Geographical Society (FAGS).
- Fellow: Royal Society of Literature (FRSL).
- Winner: Heinemann Award (1957) for A Reed Shaken by the Wind.
- President: British Junior Exploration Society.
- Committee member: Wildlife Youth Service - launched in 1963.

On 4 December 1945 Gavin Maxwell unsuccessfully stood for election to represent the Mallaig ward on Inverness County Council. In a two candidate contest, Maxwell received 126 votes against a local businessman, Isaac Wallace, who was elected with 187 votes.

Maxwell would regularly speak at universities, schools and other institutions about his experiences with wildlife and exploration. In December 1960 Maxwell joined the Committee of Honour for the National Campaign for the Abolition of Capital Punishment (NCACP) - this committee had a large number of writers, lawyers, academics, actors and other well known figures opposed to the use of the death penalty in the UK judicial system. He endorsed campaigns supporting Danilo Dolci, an anti-Mafia social activist in Italy who launched multiple protests against corruption and poverty.

== Gavin Maxwell's otter ==
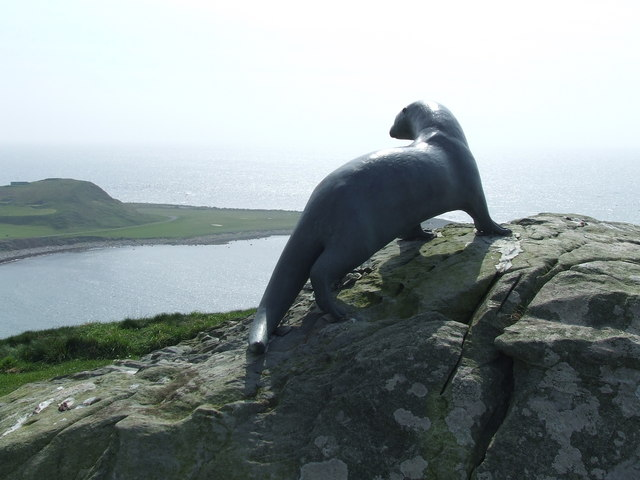
Statue of Maxwell's otter at Monreith by Penny Wheatley, 1978.

Maxwell's book Ring of Bright Water describes how, in 1956, he brought a smooth-coated otter back from Iraq and raised it in Camusfeàrna at Sandaig Bay on the west coast of Scotland. He took the otter, called Mijbil, to the London Zoological Society, where it was decided that this was a previously unconfirmed subspecies of smooth-coated otter, that some experts thought to be extinct. It was therefore named Lutrogale perspicillata maxwelli (or, colloquially, "Maxwell's otter") after him. It was thought to have become extinct in the alluvial salt marshes of Iraq as a result of the large-scale drainage of the area that started in the 1960s; newer surveys suggest large populations remain throughout its range, though they still remain vulnerable.

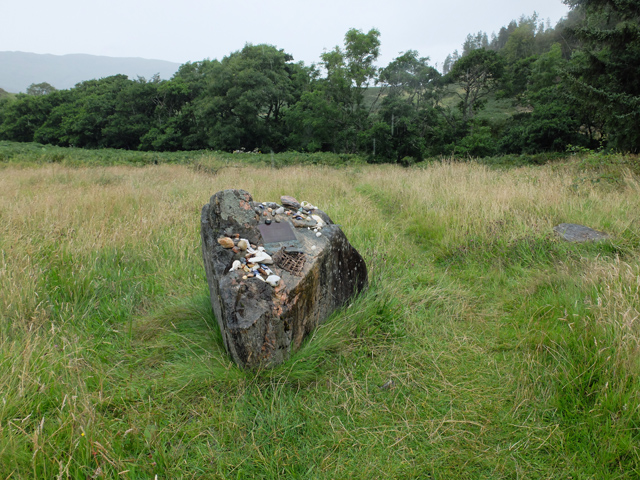
Maxwell's memorial boulder on the former site of his Camusfeàrna home

In his book The Marsh Arabs, Wilfred Thesiger wrote:

[I]n 1956, Gavin Maxwell, who wished to write a book about the Marshes, came with me to Iraq, and I took him round in my tarada for seven weeks. He had always wanted an otter as a pet, and at last, I found him a baby European otter which unfortunately died after a week, towards the end of his visit. He was in Basra preparing to go home when I managed to obtain an otter, which I sent to him. This, very dark in colour and about six weeks old, proved to be a new species. Gavin took it to England, and the species was named after him.

== Bibliography ==
- Harpoon at a Venture. London: Rupert Hart-Davis, 1952. USA edition: Harpoon Venture. New York: The Viking Press, 1952.
  - Reissued several times, including paperback - Edinburgh: Birlinn, 2013 ISBN 978-1-78027-180-4; and ebook: Edinburgh: Birlinn, 2013; ISBN 978-0-85790-704-2
  - French edition: Trois saisons de chasse aux requins géants (Three seasons hunting basking sharks). Paris: Amiot-Dumont, 1952. Spanish: Yo compré una isla (I Bought an Island). Barcelona: Aymà, 1953. Italian: Arpioni da ventura. Rome: Bompiani, 1954.
  - Available for online borrowing: Harpoon at a Venture at the Internet Archive. London: New English Library, 1972.
- God Protect Me from My Friends. London: Longmans, 1956. USA edition: Bandit. New York: Harper & Brothers, 1956.
  - Reissued with bigger print run by the Readers Union book club under a new cover and layout. London: Readers Union, 1957.
  - Reissued as paperback with revisions. London: Pan, 1972 ISBN 978-0-330-02787-8.
  - French edition: Giuliano: bandit sicilien (Giuliano: Sicilian bandit). Paris: Plon, 1959. Italian: Dagli amici mi guardi Iddio. Rome: Feltrinelli, 1957). German: Wer erschoss Salvatore Giuliano? (Who shot Salvatore Giuliano?). Hamburg: Rowohlt, 1963. Dutch: Bewaar mij voor mijn vrienden (Protect me from my friends). Amsterdam: de Boer, 1957
- A Reed Shaken by the Wind. London: Longmans, 1957. USA edition: People of the Reeds. New York, Harper & Brothers, 1957.
  - Reissued with bigger print run by the Readers Union book club under a new cover and layout. London: Readers Union, 1959.
  - Reissued several times, including paperback - London: Eland, 2003 ISBN 978-0-907871-93-4; and ebook: London, Eland, 2003 ISBN 978-1-78060-060-4.
  - French edition: Le peuple des roseaux (People of the Reeds). Paris: Flammarion, 1960. German: Ein Rohr, vom Winde bewegt. Berlin: Ullstein, 1959. Swedish: Ett rö vinden (A Gust of Wind). Stockholm: Norstedt, 1958. Arabic: قصبة في مهب الريح (A Reed in the Wind). Beirut: Dar al-Hayat, 1968. Dutch: Volk in riet en modder (People in Reeds and Mud). Amsterdam: de Boer, 1958.
  - Available for online borrowing: A Reed Shaken by the Wind at the Internet Archive. London: Eland, 1994.
- The Ten Pains of Death. London: Longmans, 1959. USA edition, same title: New York: Dutton, 1960.
  - Paperback reissued - Gloucester, Alan Sutton, 1986 ISBN 978-0-86299-289-7.
  - German edition: Die zehn Todesqualen. Hamburg: Rowohlt, 1961. Dutch: Als de kinderen huilen gaan we stelen (When the Children Cry, We Steal). Antwerp: Diogenes, 1961. Swedish:Dödens tio plågor. Stockholm: Norstedt, 1961.
  - Available for online borrowing: The Ten Pains of Death at the Internet Archive. London: Longmans, 1959.
- Ring of Bright Water. Illustrated by Peter Scott. London: Longmans, 1960. USA edition, same title: New York: Dutton, 1960.
  - Reissued many times in hardback, paperback, audiobook, Braille, large print and ebook formats.
  - Recent reissues - Bridport: Little Toller Books, 2014 ISBN 978-0-9562545-0-4 - paperback and ebook. Includes a 5 page introduction by Sir John Lister-Kaye written in 2009.
  - Centenary reissue: Lewes: Unicorn Publishing, 2014 ISBN 978-1-910065-09-9 - hardback. Includes a foreword by Kate Humble, illustrated by Mark Adlington.
  - Folio Society hardback reissue: London: Folio Society, 2015. Includes 8 page introduction by Robert Macfarlane. illustrated by Michael Ayrton.
  - There are many foreign language translations in various formats. Titles vary, sometimes within the same language. Examples - French: Mes amies les outres (My friends the otters); Italian: L'Annello di acque lucenti and; Spanish: El círculo de agua clara; German: Mein geliebter Haustyrann (My beloved domestic tyrant) and Ein Ring aus hellem Wasser (ebook available).
  - Available for online borrowing: Ring of Bright Water at the Internet Archive. London: Longmans, 1960.
- The Otters' Tale. London: Longmans, 1962. USA edition, same title: New York: Dutton, 1962.
  - An abridged version of Ring of Bright Water, aimed at children, to focus on the otters. Has a new introduction from the author. Many additional photos compared to the original Ring of Bright Water.
  - Reissued several times, most recent: Harmondsworth: Puffin, 1977 ISBN 978-0-14-030915-7; Harmondsworth: Penguin, 1979 ISBN 978-0-14-030915-7.
  - Italian edition: Racconto delle lontre. Florence: Sansoni, 1978.
  - Available for online borrowing: The Otters' Tale at the Internet Archive. New York: Dutton, 1962.
- The Rocks Remain. London: Longmans, 1963. USA edition, same title: New York: Dutton, 1963.
  - Reissued several times, including in large print and Braille editions.
  - Reissued as paperback: Harmondsworth: Penguin, 1984 ISBN 978-0-14-003926-9.
  - German edition: Heim zu meinen ottern (At Home with my Otter). Berlin: Ullstein, 1963. Italian: La Baia degli Ontani (The Bay of Otters). Milan: Rizzoli, 1986.
  - Available for online borrowing: The Rocks Remain at the Internet Archive. London: Longmans, 1963.
- The House of Elrig. London: Longmans, 1965. USA edition, same title: New York, Dutton, 1965.
  - This book was written in early 1964 but only published after the death of Maxwell's mother, in October 1965.
  - Reissued several times including in Braille editions.
  - Most recent reissues include: Harmondsworth: Penguin, 1974 ISBN 978-0-14-003925-2; Edinburgh: Birlinn, 2003; ISBN 978-1-84158-258-0.
  - Italian edition: Casa di Elrig. Padova: Muzzio, 1990 ISBN 978-88-7021-531-1.
  - Available for online borrowing: The House of Elrig at the Internet Archive. London: Longmans, 1965.
- Lords of the Atlas: Morocco, the rise and fall of the House of Glaoua. London: Longmans, 1966.
  - Reissues hardback: New York: Lyons Press, 2000 ISBN 978-0-304-35419-1; paperback: London: Eland, 2004 ISBN 978-0-907871-14-9; ebook: 2012 ISBN 978-1-78060-016-1.
  - French edition: El-Glaoui, dernier seigneur de l'Atlas(El Glaoui, Last Lord of the Atlas). Rabat: Dar al-Aman, 2016 ISBN 978-9954-502-51-8.
  - Available for online borrowing: Lords of the Atlas at the Internet Archive. London: Longmans, 1966.
- Seals of the World. London: Constable, 1967, second in Constable World Wildlife series. USA edition, same title: Boston: Houghton Mifflin, 1967.
  - Written in collaboration with John Stidworthy and David Williams.
  - Available for online borrowing: Seals of the World at the Internet Archive. Boston: Houghton Mifflin, 1967.
- Raven Seek Thy Brother. London: Longmans, 1969. USA edition, same title: New York: Dutton, 1969.
  - Reissues include - London: Pan, 1970 ISBN 978-0-330-02523-2; Harmondsworth: Penguin, 1974 ISBN 978-0-14-003924-5. Also available in large print.
  - Available for online borrowing: Raven Seek Thy Brother at the Internet Archive. New York: Dutton, 1969.
- The Ring of Bright Water Trilogy. London: Viking, 2001 ISBN 978-0-670-88992-1. USA edition: Ring of bright water: a trilogy. Boston: Nonpareil, 2011 ISBN 978-1-56792-400-8.
  - Abridged and edited by Austin Chinn. This trilogy was edited down to a single volume, published 32 years after Maxwell's death. It includes about 70% of Ring of Bright Water, and less than half of The Rocks Remain and Raven Seek Thy Brother. One page introduction by Jimmy Watt, three page afterword by Virginia McKenna.
  - Reissued as paperback - Harmondsworth: Penguin, 2001 ISBN 978-0-14-029049-3 and ebook: ISBN 978-0-14-192720-6. USA ebook - Boston: Nonpareil, 2011; ISBN 978-1-56792-484-8

As of July 2025, the following works are not available as commercial ebooks: God Protect Me from My Friends, The Ten Pains of Death, The Otters' Tale, The House of Elrig, Seals of the World. Two books, The Rocks Remain and Raven Seek Thy Brother are only available as commercial ebooks in abridged form, via The Ring of Bright Water Trilogy. Most of Maxwell's original titles are available as non-commercial online digitalisations as noted above, as part of the Open Library initiative. The one exception is God Protect me from my Friends, which is currently not available as commercial ebook or as an Open Library resource. Currently The Ring of Bright Water Trilogy is available as a commercial ebook, but only a limited access library digitalisation.

=== Biography ===
- The White Island by John Lister-Kaye. London: Longmans, 1972. Paperback: ISBN 978-0-582-10903-2. USA edition: New York: Dutton, 1973 ISBN 978-0-525-23284-1.
  - Reissued as a paperback: London: Pan, 1976 ISBN 978-0-330-24226-4.
  - Lister-Kaye was asked by Maxwell to help him with wildlife projects on Eilean Bàn. This book covers the events of 1969, including Maxwell's death.
  - Available for online borrowing: The White Island at the Internet Archive. London: Longmans, 1972.
- Maxwell's Ghost - An Epilogue to Gavin Maxwell's Camusfeàrna by Richard Frere. London: Victor Gollancz, 1976 ISBN 978-0-575-02044-3.
  - Reissued (1999) ISBN 978-1-84158-003-6 and (2011) ISBN 978-1-78027-011-1.
  - This book covers the period from 1962 to 1969, when Frere and his wife, Joan Frere, were employed by Maxwell on various building projects and managing his company. It detailed how Maxwell's mood swings could strain his friendships, and contained the first public acknowledgement of Maxwell's homosexuality.
  - Available for online borrowing: Maxwell's Ghost at the Internet Archive. London: Victor Gollancz, 1976.
- Autobiographies by Kathleen Raine. London: Skoob Books, 1991. Paperback: ISBN 978-1-871438-41-3
  - This is a collection of four previously published memoirs, edited by Lucien Jenkins. While not a conventional autobiography, Raine does cover her friendship with Maxwell in some detail in The Lion's Mouth. London: Hamish Hamilton, which was first published in 1977 ISBN 978-0-241-89756-0 This was soon after Frere's book, and also confirmed Maxwell's sexuality.
  - Available for online borrowing (USA edition): The Lion's Mouth at the Internet Archive. New York: Braziller, 1978.
- The Adventures of Gavin Maxwell compiled and edited by Richard M. Adams. London: Ward Lock, 1980 Hardback: ISBN 978-0-7062-3894-5; Paperback: ISBN 978-0-7062-3974-4.
  - This relatively short book (144 pages) is part of series from Ward Lock Educational Lives, aimed at teenagers, all with similar formats. Almost all the text in this book was originally written by Maxwell, with long extracts from his books, laying out a sequential biography in mostly Maxwell's own words. Some extracts are from Frere. These sections of text are introduced, and then connected by paragraphs, provided by Richard M. Adams.
- Gavin Maxwell, A Life by Douglas Botting. London: HarperCollins, 1993 ISBN 978-0-246-13046-4.
  - Reissued as The Saga of Ring of Bright Water - The Enigma of Gavin Maxwell Glasgow: Neil Wilson Publishing, 2000 ISBN 978-1-897784-85-3.
  - Reissued under the original title: London: Eland, 2017, paperback ISBN 978-1-78060-106-9; ebook: ISBN 978-1-78060-097-0.
  - This is a comprehensive biography, running to 568 pages and covers his whole life. Botting was a friend of Maxwell for the twelve years prior to Maxwell's death, and occasionally worked for him. This biography was authorised by the literary executors of Gavin Maxwell's estate, who as Botting noted in the Preface (page xvii), put some limitations on the book's contents, in return for access to Maxwell's papers and business records.
- Island of Dreams: Stalking Gavin Maxwell's Ghost by Dan Boothby. Self published for Amazon Kindles, 2014.
  - Republished as Island of Dreams: A Personal History of a Remarkable Place. London: Picador, 2015 ISBN 978-1-5098-0075-9. Paperback:ISBN 978-1-5098-0077-3; ebook: ISBN 978-1-5098-0076-6.
  - A personal memoir of the author's time living and working at or near Maxwell's former homes in the Scottish Highlands from 2005 to 2007.
  - Available for online borrowing: Island of Dreams at the Internet Archive. London: Picador, 2015.

=== Biographical novel ===
- Remember the Rowan by Kirsten MacQuarrie. Glasgow: Ringwood Publishing, 2024 ISBN 978-1-917011-04-4. Originally self-published as The Rowan Tree. Scarborough: Valley Press, 2023 ISBN 978-1-915606-07-5.
  - A biographical novel with a fictional account of Maxwell's relationship with Raine, and others. Based on historical papers and related research, some of the narrative, events and much of the dialogue is projected by the author. Contains the full text of Maxwell's 1961 letter to Raine, telling her of his forthcoming marriage.
