= Aigas =

Coordinates: 57.43584°N 4.56612°W

Aigas: Scottish Gaelic: Àigeis
- Location within the Inverness area
- OS grid reference: NH460413
- Council area: Highland
- Country: Scotland
- Sovereign state: United Kingdom
- Postcode district: IV4 7
- Police: Scotland
- Fire: Scottish
- Ambulance: Scottish
- UK Parliament: Ross, Skye and Lochaber
- Scottish Parliament: Skye, Lochaber and Badenoch

Aigas (Scottish Gaelic: Àigeis, meaning "Place of the Gap") is a small hamlet in the Highland Council area of Scotland. It is 5 miles (8 km) southwest of Beauly and 15 miles (24 km) west of Inverness, on the north bank of the River Beauly. Crask of Aigas is nearby, to the northeast.

In the past, Aigas was divided into two parts, Easter and Wester Aigas. In 1580, King James VI granted both of these areas of land to Alexander Forbes of Pitsligo, a nobleman of Clan MacFarlane and great-great-grandfather of Alexander Forbes, 4th Lord Forbes of Pitsligo. In 1610 however, ownership of the lands was again transferred by King James to Simon Fraser, 6th Lord Lovat. The lands since passed down the male line of Clan Fraser of Lovat.

Archaeological evidence shows settlements around the area of Aigas dating back to the Bronze Age, with ancient dwellings made from local whinstone.

Nowadays, Aigas is home to a popular, 9-hole golf course, established in 1993, and is served by Teanassie Primary School. There is also a nearby hydroelectric dam named after the hamlet, situated on the River Beauly.

== House of Aigas (Aigas Field Centre) ==
The House of Aigas is a historic building within the hamlet, originally built as a tacksman's house during the Georgian era, sometime around 1760. In the 1870s it was sold to a wealthy family of Glaswegian shipping merchants, and used as a hunting lodge. During the Victorian era many additions were made in the Scottish baronial style, and a small arbotoreum was installed during the 1880s. Trees such as the giant sequia, nootka cypress, and western red cedar were planted in the gardens.

The house was again sold in the 1950s, becoming a council-run old folks' home before being abandoned in 1971.

Sir John Lister-Kaye bought the house in 1976, after finding it on the verge of demolition. For over 40 years the celebrated English author and conservationist has lived in and run the estate, providing many much-needed renovations. Under his direction, Aigas Estate has become an important conservation centre known as the Aigas Field Centre. The centre runs environmental education services, nature-based holidays, and a Scottish wildcat breeding programme. Aigas has also been home to a family of Eurasian beavers since 2006.

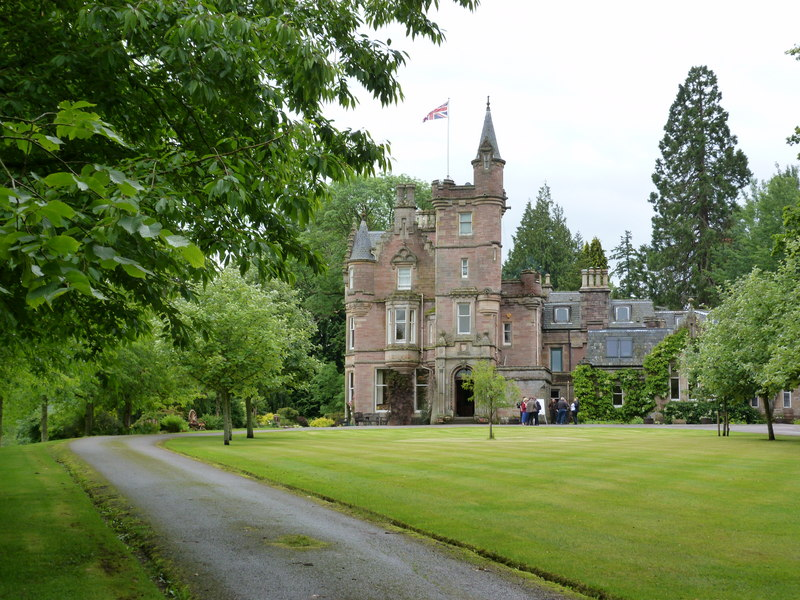
House of Aigas, viewed from its main drive

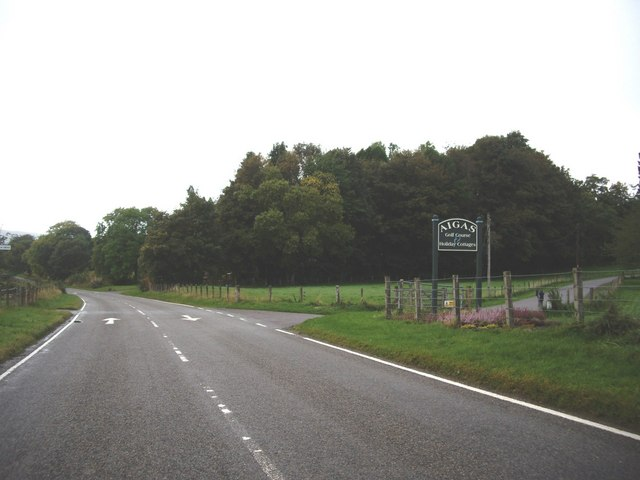
Signpost for Aigas golf course beside the A831 road, the main road running through the hamlet

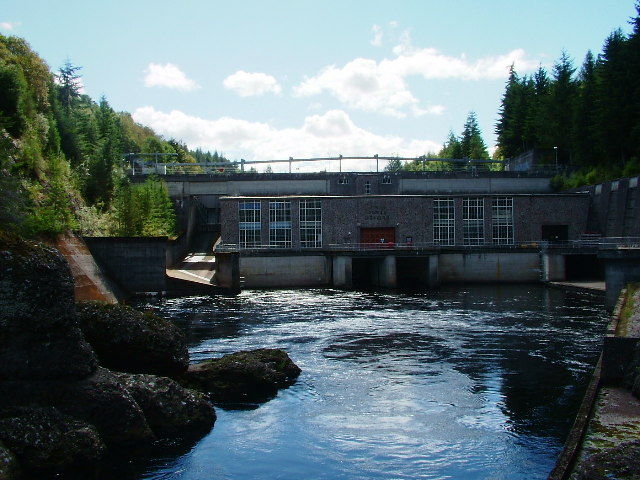
Aigas power station, situated on the Beauly River
