= Margaret Pope =

Margaret Pope may refer to:

- Margaret Pope, speechwriter and spouse of New Zealand politician David Lange (1942–2005)
- Margaret Pope (journalist and anticolonial activist) (1918–?), British journalist and anti-colonial activist

== See also ==
- Peggy Pope (Florence Margaret Pope, 1929–2020)
