= Peter Janson-Smith =

British literary agent (1922–2016)

- Born: John Peter Janson-Smith; 5 September 1922; Navestock, England
- Died: 15 April 2016 (aged 93); London
- Occupation: Literary agent
- Spouse(s): Three wives, one partner
- Children: 4

Peter Janson-Smith was a London based literary agent, with a client list that included Ian Fleming, Gavin Maxwell and Richard Holmes. After Fleming's death in 1964, Janson-Smith ran the James Bond literary franchise. This lasted until Janson-Smith retired in 2001, after 45 years of promoting the works of Ian Fleming. He was on the committee of the Royal Literary Fund (RLF) for 30 years and president from 2003 to 2005. He negotiated the complex sale of the A. A. Milne estate's rights for Winnie the Pooh to the Walt Disney Company for $350 million, to fund the RLF's Fellowship scheme.

== Early years ==
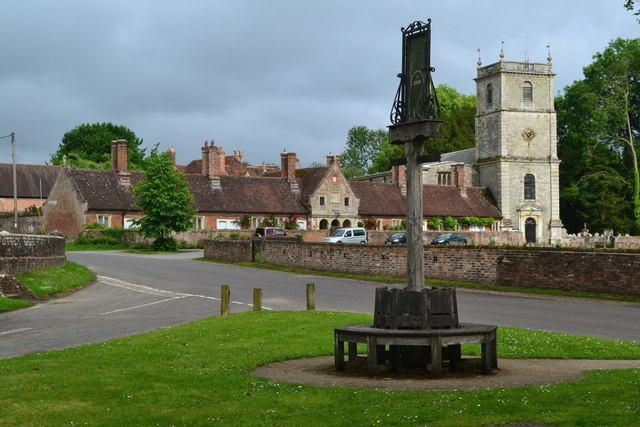
Peter Janson-Smith's childhood village, Wimborne St Giles

Peter Janson-Smith was born on 5 September 1922 in Navestock, Essex, to Rev. Edgar Smith, a Church of England vicar and his wife Alice, née Whitney. His full name was John Peter Janson-Smith but he always used Peter as his primary forename. At the time of his parents' marriage, they adopted Janson-Smith as their family surname, with Janson doubled up from one of Edgar Smith's middle names, to placate the bride's parents' concern that their daughter was about to become a Mrs. Smith. When he was three years old Peter Janson-Smith's father was appointed rector of Wimborne St Giles in Dorset, and this became his childhood home. He attended Salisbury Cathedral School, then Sherborne School. From school he went to St. Edmund's Hall, part of the University of Oxford, where he studied for a wartime degree in English. He joined the Royal Artillery as a radar specialist, and spent part of World War II in a unit operating the anti-aircraft batteries on Hackney Marshes.

== Career after World War II ==
In 1946 Janson-Smith was demobilised from the Royal Artillery with the rank of captain, but stayed in the Territorial Army, where he was promoted to major in 1948. The army had an employment service to provide opportunities for those leaving service, and the literary agent A. D. Peters had contacted them asking for an assistant with an ex-Services background. After interview Janson-Smith was taken on, and worked with Peters for the next three years. This gave Janson-Smith exposure to a particularly well known slate of British authors, including Evelyn Waugh, Kingsley Amis and J. B. Priestley. In 1949 he moved to the larger Curtis Brown agency, to manage their Foreign Language division. He did not possess any linguistic talents, but he greatly enjoyed the role, and it introduced him to the Frankfurt Book Fair, which became for him (and later his son Patrick) an annual pilgrimage.

At Curtis Brown he handled the foreign language translations for Eric Ambler, who in 1956 suggested to Janson-Smith that he should set up his own agency. Janson-Smith replied that due to the cashflow processes with publishing, this could mean a three year gap without income, which he couldn't afford. Ambler agreed to lend him money, in order to go ahead with this venture.

== Literary agent ==
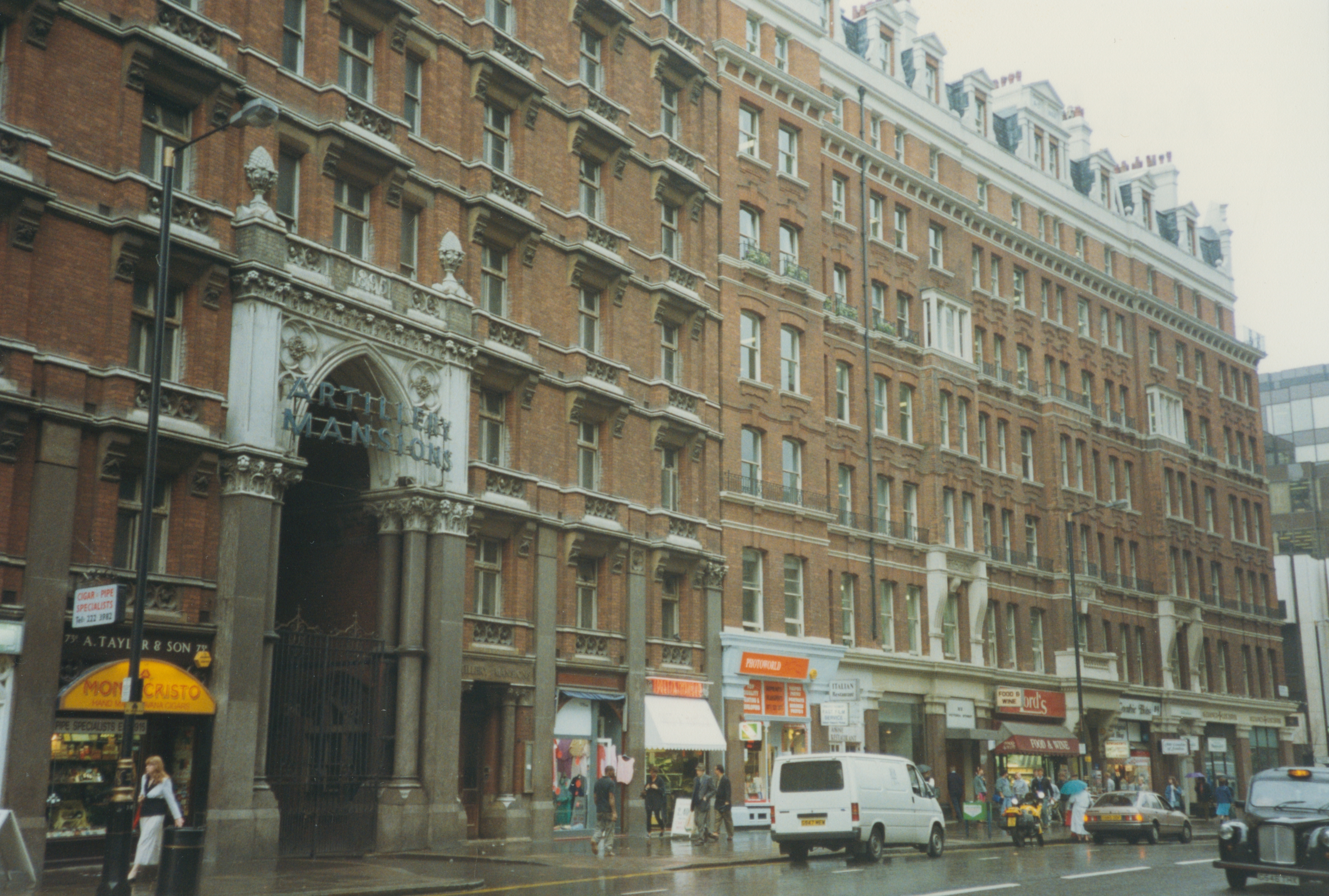
Artillery Mansions, Victoria Street, which held the office of Janson-Smith's agency

Janson-Smith set up shop in August 1956, as Peter Janson-Smith Limited, in an upstairs office in Artillery Mansions, Westminster. Later the agency moved to Great Russell Street and then Newington Green, by the site of Mary Wollstonecraft's former school for girls. He employed Deborah Rogers in the early 1960s until 1967, when she started up her own and highly successful literary agency. Janson-Smith sold the agency in 1967 to Campbell Thomson & MacLaughlin after his workload switched to the Fleming franchise. Both agencies were finally closed in 2012. In the late 1970s, Janson-Smith was briefly a commissioning editor for the Oxford University Press (OUP).

=== Ian Fleming ===
Janson-Smith attracted visibility due to his role as Chairman of Ian Fleming Publications, previously Glidrose, from 1966 until retirement in 2001. This company holds the literary and some image rights to Ian Fleming's work, and operates the franchise for the James Bond books, after Fleming death in 1964, at the age of 56 years old. Fleming had assigned his literary and film rights to external companies, a well used mechanism to reduce personal tax liabilities. It had the impact of allowing and developing the James Bond franchise, and the film series, well past the author's untimely death. The film franchise rights, with the partial exception of Casino Royale, were held by a separate company, Danjaq. As chairman of Glidrose, Janson-Smith arranged posthumous publication of Fleming's three unpublished substantive Bond books, The Man with the Golden Gun, and the then joint title of Octopussy and The Living Daylights.

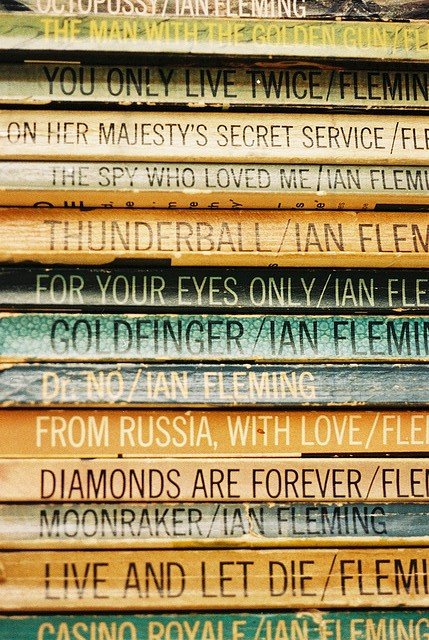
Fleming's paperback Bonds

Janson-Smith went on to allow a number of authors to continue to bring out Bond books – sometimes under a nom de plume – in the style of Fleming's original books, in part to protect the franchise from other authors' independent attempts. The first example of this was when Janson-Smith approached Sir Kingsley Amis in 1967 and he agreed to write Colonel Sun under the name of Robert Markham. He also helped steward the Chitty-Chitty-Bang-Bang literary rights. Janson-Smith appeared in Everything or Nothing, Stevan Riley's 2012 documentary of the James Bond franchise.

Peter Janson-Smith first started work with Ian Fleming in September 1956. Ian Fleming was initially looking just for someone to handle foreign translation rights to his books, since he felt able to handle his own contracts in Britain, and had an agent for the US market. Eric Ambler, during a dinner pary, gave Fleming the telephone number of Janson-Smith, who had a background in translations from his previous role with Curtis Brown. Janson-Smith impressed Fleming when he quickly got a Dutch publisher, Bruna, lined up, and this soon developed into a close business friendship. After Fleming's death Janson-Smith was able to gain the trust of Fleming's widow Ann, who had some antipathy towards the publishing industry, and this enabled his long tenure chairing the franchise.

After the death of Janson-Smith, on 12 April 2016, a tribute was issued by Ian Fleming Publications. Kate Grimond, a niece of Ian Fleming, said on behalf of the family: "The news of Peter’s death is very sad. His custodianship of the Fleming literary legacy was long and dedicated and impressive and as a man of integrity and easy company he formed close friendships with many writers, publishers, collectors and other significant people within the world of Bond, all of whom will mourn his death."

=== Gavin Maxwell ===
Gavin Maxwell, the Scottish naturalist and explorer, was best known for his book Ring of Bright Water. Janson-Smith made more than a passing contribution to the book's development. Maxwell was looking for ideas after the success of A Reed Shaken by the Wind, which Janson-Smith had supervised and which won the Heinemann Award in 1957. Maxwell's original suggestions involved an expedition to Assam or Siam (Thailand). This sounded extravagantly expensive to Janson-Smith, particularly given Maxwell's cavalier approach to money. Instead he gently mooted a suggestion, first made by Maxwell's editor at Longman at a meeting with Janson-Smith (where Maxwell was not present) for a book about the otters at Maxwell's remote home opposite the Isle of Skye in the Scottish Highlands. Probably to Janson-Smith's surprise, Maxwell had a flash of inspiration, and with unusual speed provided a draft of a short section of Ring of Bright Water within a few days. Maxwell, Janson-Smith and Longman immediately realised this would be a bestseller, well before the book was written. It sold over 2 million books, and was, at different times, the best selling book in the UK, USA and much of the Commonwealth, and has never been out of print.

Maxwell was one of Janson-Smith's most demanding and difficult authors, prone to temper tantrums and dramatic financial demands. Janson-Smith's calm personality was quite the opposite, yet they were very fond of each other, and Maxwell came to rely on Janson-Smith for emotional support when a series of disasters crashed over the Scottish author. He was Maxwell's agent from 1957 until beyond Maxwell's death in 1969 - he was one of the two literary trustees to Maxwell's estate. Similar to Fleming, Maxwell was a heavy smoker, drank copiously, and died of lung cancer at 55 years old.

=== Other authors ===
Janson-Smith also represented Anthony Burgess briefly, including the contract for A Clockwork Orange, C. Northcote Parkinson, Alan Williams, the biographers Alan Palmer and Richard Holmes. The other estates of authors that he managed included Agatha Christie, A. A. Milne and Georgette Heyer. Some of this management came through Janson-Smith's contacts with the Author's Division of the Booker Group.

== Royal Literary Fund ==
Janson-Smith first joined the committee of the Royal Literary Fund in 1972 and stayed involved for the next 35 years in different roles, including a 2 year term as president in 2003-2005. One of the RLF's main activities is providing grants, scholarships and fellowships to authors that the RLF considers to be deserving cases, and the Fund gets much of its money in the form of bequests from established writers.

Janson-Smith had a long involvement in managing the estate of A. A. Milne, which provided money for Milne's family, the Garrick Club, Westminster School and the RLF. Janson-Smith headed up negotiations in 2001 with Walt Disney over the film rights to Winnie the Pooh, which resulted in a $350 million payment into the estate. The RLF was the biggest beneficiary, receiving a capital injection to the RLF's Fellowship Fund of £80 million. This provides long term funding for writers to be paid a stipend to work at British universities, in return for some teaching work, thus allowing the academic development of both students and writers. Over 750 writers have been funded since 1999.

== Personal life ==
Janson-Smith married three times. His last companion, from 1985 until his death in 2013, was Holocaust survivor Lili Stern-Pohlmann. Though he was renowned for his sociable drinking with authors, he also held serious views about the lessons from World War II, and made a number of visits to the Judaica Foundation Cultural Centre in Kraków with Stern-Pohlmann, to promote greater understanding of the Holocaust. He celebrated his 90th birthday with a concert held in his honour at the Centre. He had three daughters, Alice, Diana and Deidre. His son from his second marriage, Patrick Janson-Smith, was the successful publisher behind the Black Swan imprint, becoming part of Transworld and then the Blue Door imprint, part of HarperCollins.
