= Aigas Field Centre =

Nature centre in Highland, Scotland

Coordinates: 57.4373°N 4.5677°W

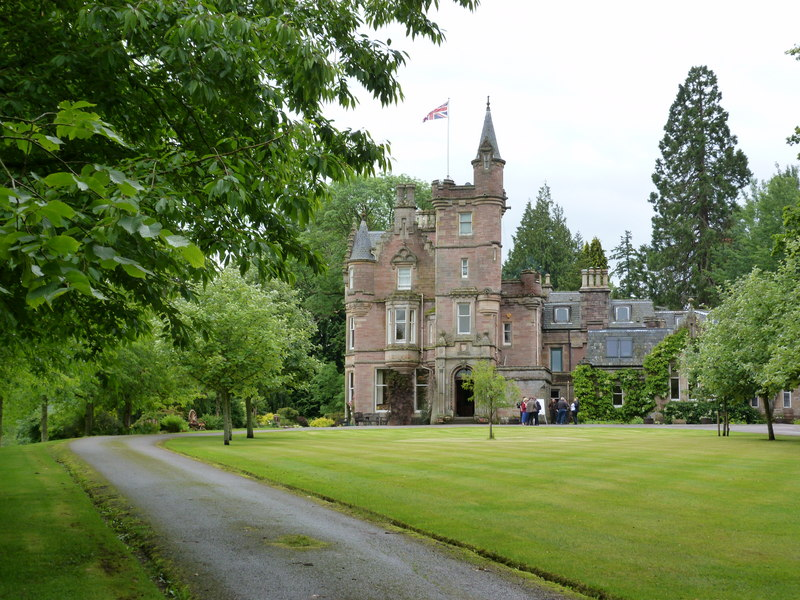
House of Aigas

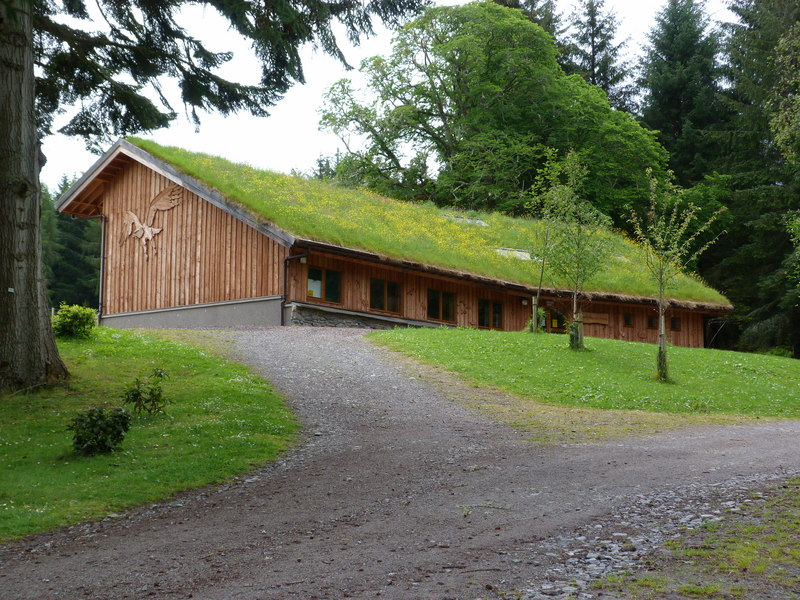
The Magnus House

Aigas Field Centre is a nature centre based at the home of naturalist and author Sir John Lister-Kaye, House of Aigas. The centre was opened in 1977 by ecologist Sir Frank Fraser Darling, and provides nature-based holidays for adults and environmental education services for school children. It is located at Aigas, next to the River Beauly, 8 kilometres (5.0 mi) west of Beauly and 20 kilometres (12 mi) west of Inverness, in the Scottish Highlands.

House of Aigas, once a Victorian sporting estate, was owned by the Gordon-Oswalds, who added the Victorian extensions to what was an 18th-century Tacksman's house. The house was then owned by Inverness County Council as an old people's home, before Lister-Kaye persuaded them to sell it to him.

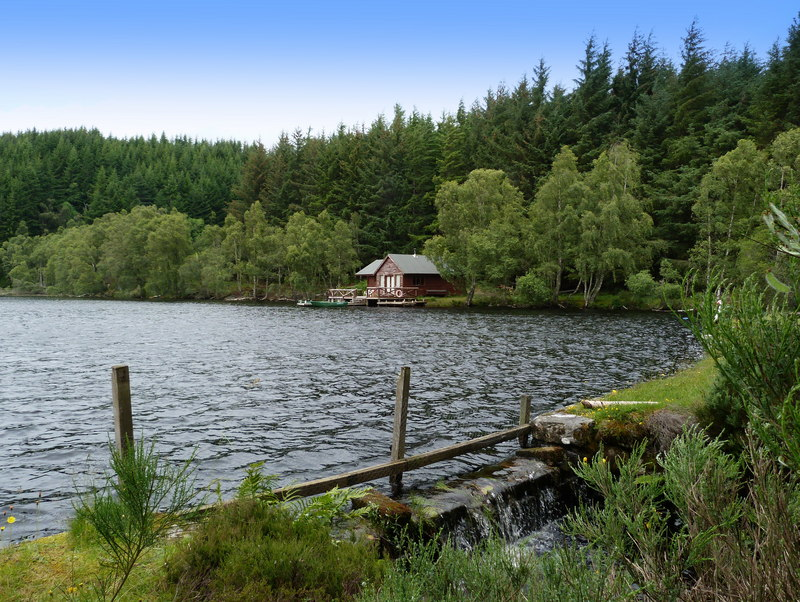
Aigas Loch

Aigas began a beaver demonstration project in 2006. Two Eurasian beavers were released into a 200-acre enclosure, which includes a loch and surrounding woodland. The beavers have since built lodges and had a number of kits.

Aigas was host to a series of the BBC's live-action nature documentary, Autumnwatch in October 2012 and Winterwatch in January 2013.

House of Aigas and Field Centre's charitable arm, The Aigas Trust for Environmental Education, hosts over 5,000 school children a year.
