= Crask of Aigas =

Coordinates: 57.4446°N 4.5559°W

Crask of Aigas: Scottish Gaelic: Àigeis Crasg; Scots: Crask o' Aigas
- Location within the Inverness area
- OS grid reference: NH483421
- Council area: Highland
- Country: Scotland
- Sovereign state: United Kingdom
- Postcode district: IV4 7
- Police: Scotland
- Fire: Scottish
- Ambulance: Scottish
- UK Parliament: Ross, Skye and Lochaber
- Scottish Parliament: Skye, Lochaber and Badenoch

Crask of Aigas (Scottish Gaelic: Àigeis Crasg, meaning "Crossing Place of Aigas") is a small hamlet in the Highland council area of Scotland. It is 4.3 miles (7 km) southwest of Beauly. The scattered hamlet of Aigas lies a short distance to the southwest.

Crask of Aigas is located on a hill overlooking River Beauly; it is on the river's north side. The main street is a cul-de-sac, with the old village blacksmith's at its end.

The A831 road runs directly through the hamlet's centre, continuing all the way to Cannich and the valley of Strathglass. For this reason, Crask of Aigas has been referred to as "the gateway to the glens of the west".

During the 19th century, Crask of Aigas had a village inn, and was hence a stopping point for travellers to eat and rest along with their horses.

The hamlet is served by Teanassie Primary School, and a bus service to nearby Beauly.

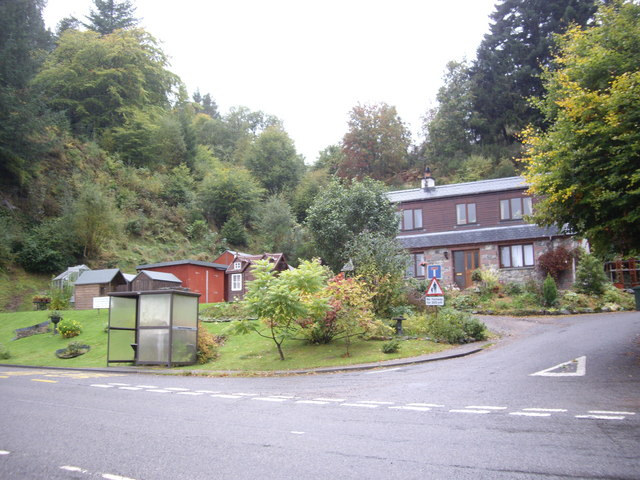
The bus shelter and road junction leading up to Crask of Aigas

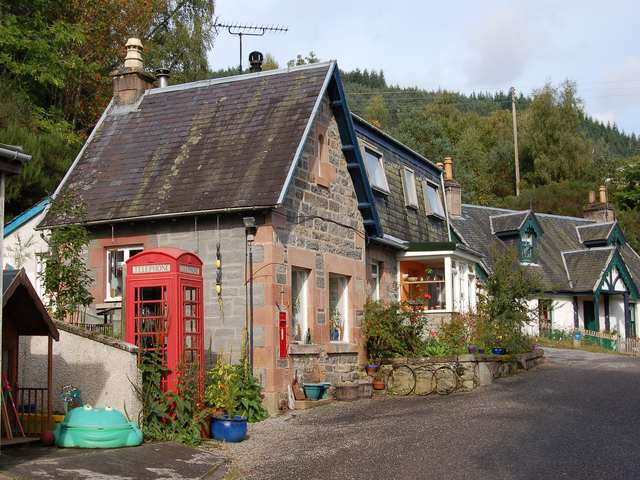
Main street in Crask of Aigas

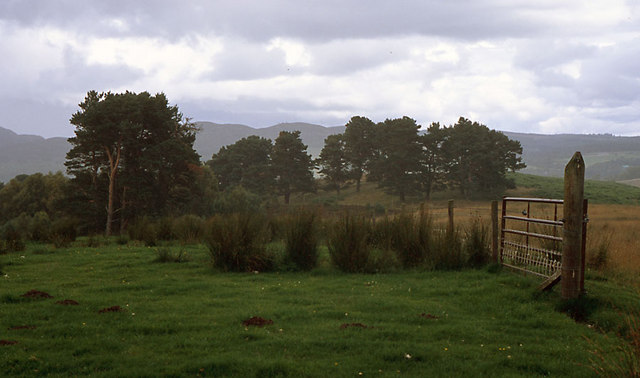
Fields and glens looking south from Crask of Aigas
