= Tex Geddes =

Scottish author and adventurer (1919–1998)

Joseph "Tex" Geddes
- Born: 24 October 1919; Peterhead, Aberdeenshire, Scotland
- Died: 11 April 1998 (aged 78); Broadford, Isle of Skye, Scotland
- Occupation: Author
- Spouse: Jeanne Geddes
- Children: Duncan Geddes
- Writing career
- Genre: Outdoor literature
- Notable work: Hebridean Sharker

Joseph "Tex" Geddes (24 October 1919 – 11 April 1998) was a Scottish author, adventurer, and self-styled Laird of Soay best known for the memoir Hebridean Sharker (1960) about his adventures on sharking boats off the west coast of Scotland with Gavin Maxwell and others. Geddes was a central character in Maxwell's Harpoon at a Venture (1952), an account of their failed shark oil extraction venture on Soay and also featured in Ian Mitchell's Isles of the West (1999).

== Biography ==
Geddes was born in Scotland in 1919 and claimed to have been raised by his father in Canada. He was said to have worked as a lumber camp monkey boy sawing tree tops and as a rum runner in the North Atlantic before returning to Britain during World War II, although some details are disputed. Geddes was a special forces instructor alongside Gavin Maxwell in Arisaig during the war, where as a sergeant in the Seaforth Highlanders he specialised in amphibious warfare. Following the war and his marriage to Cheltenham Ladies College-educated Jeanne, Geddes served on the Mallaig lifeboat. He joined Gavin Maxwell's basking shark oil extraction venture in the late 1940s, harpooning basking sharks in the Minch from the Traveller, the remains of which boat are still visible in Soay Harbour. After Maxwell's business venture failed and he abandoned the island, Geddes and his wife purchased Soay in 1952. Geddes continued fishing basking sharks, selling unprocessed livers rather than processed oil to Glasgow. While much of the remaining population of the island evacuated to Mull in 1953, Geddes and his family remained. Geddes protested at the lack of emergency telephone services and with the threat of loss of postal service to the remaining inhabitants of the island, he asked people to send him registered letters and packages. As a result the service was kept with post arriving once a month. Historian of Gaelic culture Margaret Fay Shaw said of him: "Tex was a great storyteller and important as such. He was also immensely kind, and had that hunger for life and fun that is essential if you are to make a go of living in these islands. The Hebrides needs more people like Tex Geddes. So does the world."

Geddes died during a return journey from a bagpiping competition in the Outer Hebrides. A memorial to Tex and his wife is placed at a stone bench on the trail pass over the middle of Soay.

== Publications ==
- Geddes, Tex (April 2012). Hebridean Sharker. reprint. Birlinn. ISBN 978-1-780270340.
