= Ring of Bright Water =

Book by Gavin Maxwell

- Cover of first edition
- Author: Gavin Maxwell
- Illustrator: Peter Scott
- Publication date: 1960
- ISBN: 0-14-003923-6

Ring of Bright Water is a book by Gavin Maxwell about his life in a remote house in coastal Scotland where he kept several wild otters as pets. First published in 1960, it became a best seller and is considered a literary masterpiece, eventually selling over two million copies. A fictionalised film of the same name was made from it and released in 1969.

== Background ==
Gavin Maxwell wrote Ring of Bright Water in the early summer months of 1959, leading up to a publication date of 12 September 1960. Substantial sections were written outdoors by a waterfall near Camusfeàrna, the name Maxwell gave his house at Sandaig near Glenelg. He wrote the book in longhand, with a fountain pen, in six foolscap barristers' case books. The manuscripts are now preserved in the National Library for Scotland, including an inky otter's footprint on volume 3.

The book's origins relate to the events after Maxwell's previous book, A Reed Shaken by the Wind. This was critically successful, winning the 1957 Heinemann prize, but was not so successful in terms of book sales and thus royalties. Maxwell had a pressing need for money, and suggested to his literary agent, Peter Janson-Smith, that his next book should be based in Asia. Janson-Smith and his publisher, Longman were worried at the potential expense of any advance, given Maxwell's poor track record with budgetary self-control. In early 1958 his editor at Longman, George Hardinge, had another idea, which he suggested to Mark Longman and Janson-Smith - could Maxwell be persuaded to write about life with his otters in London and Scotland? Janson-Smith then took the idea to Maxwell, and probably to his surprise, Maxwell was strongly taken by the proposal. He wrote a draft section of part of the book - the herring-fry silver fish scene which is now part of chapter 4 - in just a few days, and presented this draft to Janson-Smith and Longman. Both were impressed by the quality of writing and Longman decided that a big print run would be allocated to the final book. Maxwell was given a £1250 advance (equivalent to around £25,000 in 2025 terms) on 4 March 1958.

== Book ==
The book describes how Maxwell brought to England a smooth-coated otter, from the Marshes of Iraq.

Maxwell named the otter Mijbil. He raised Mijbil at Camusfeàrna, on the west coast of Scotland. Maxwell took Mijbil to the London Zoological Society where it was determined that Mijbil belonged to a previously unknown subspecies, subsequently named after Maxwell: Lutrogale perspicillata maxwelli (or colloquially, "Maxwell's otter").

'"Into this bright, watery landscape Mij moved and took possession with a delight that communicated itself as clearly as any articulate speech could have done," he wrote. "The waterfall, the burn, the white beaches and the islands; his form became the familiar foreground to them all."'

The book's title was taken from a 1952 poem, The Marriage of Psyche by Kathleen Raine, who said in her autobiography that Maxwell had been the love of her life. The Marriage of Psyche was written as a love poem, in reference to her deep feelings towards Maxwell, however in Ring of Bright Water it is reproduced in full, unattributed on the page, and seemingly reframed to refer to the otters. Her relationship with Maxwell deteriorated after 1956 when she indirectly caused the death of Mijbil.

In 1962 Gavin Maxwell edited the original text to create a new book, The Otters' Tale. This was also published by the same publishers, Longman in the UK, Dutton in the USA. It was intended as a version of Ring for children, however Maxwell largely stayed with the original wording, the text is not simplified. Some material in The Otters' Tale was not present in Ring of Bright Water. But it is shorter, printed in a more informal square orientation rather than traditional portrait, and events that didn't take place in Sandaig were invariably chopped out of this version. There is a plea to readers, in the foreword, that otters should not be considered suitable as pets - this does not feature in Ring. There are many additional black and white photos and drawings in The Otters' Tale, and a few colour photos, almost all of which are of the otters.

== Reception ==
A reviewer in the Sunday Herald described the book as having "inspired a generation of naturalists" and referred to it as a "classic account of man and wildlife". The review calls Ring of Bright Water "one of the most popular wildlife books ever written", as over two million copies had been sold worldwide by 1999.

The book's style is unorthodox. It is neither a diary, nor a natural history book. It is part autobiography, but it also has a narrative style more familiar in works of fiction. Austin Chinn, the editor of the trilogy version of Ring of Bright Water, suggests that Maxwell may have been influenced by Walden by Henry David Thoreau. There are overtones of transcendentalism in Ring of Bright Water.

== Legacy ==
Two sequels were published: The Rocks Remain (1963) and Raven Seek Thy Brother (1968), which were less idyllic than the first, chronicling accidents and misfortunes involving both the otters and Maxwell's life. All three books were republished as Ring of Bright Water: A Trilogy in 2011 by Nonpareil Books. The trilogy does not include the full text of the latter two volumes, and around 70% of the text of Ring of Bright Water, by removing almost all of the tangential travel sections which take place outside Scotland.
