= Soay, Inner Hebrides =

Island of the Inner Hebrides, Highland Scotland

Soay
Sòdhaigh (Gaelic)

Location
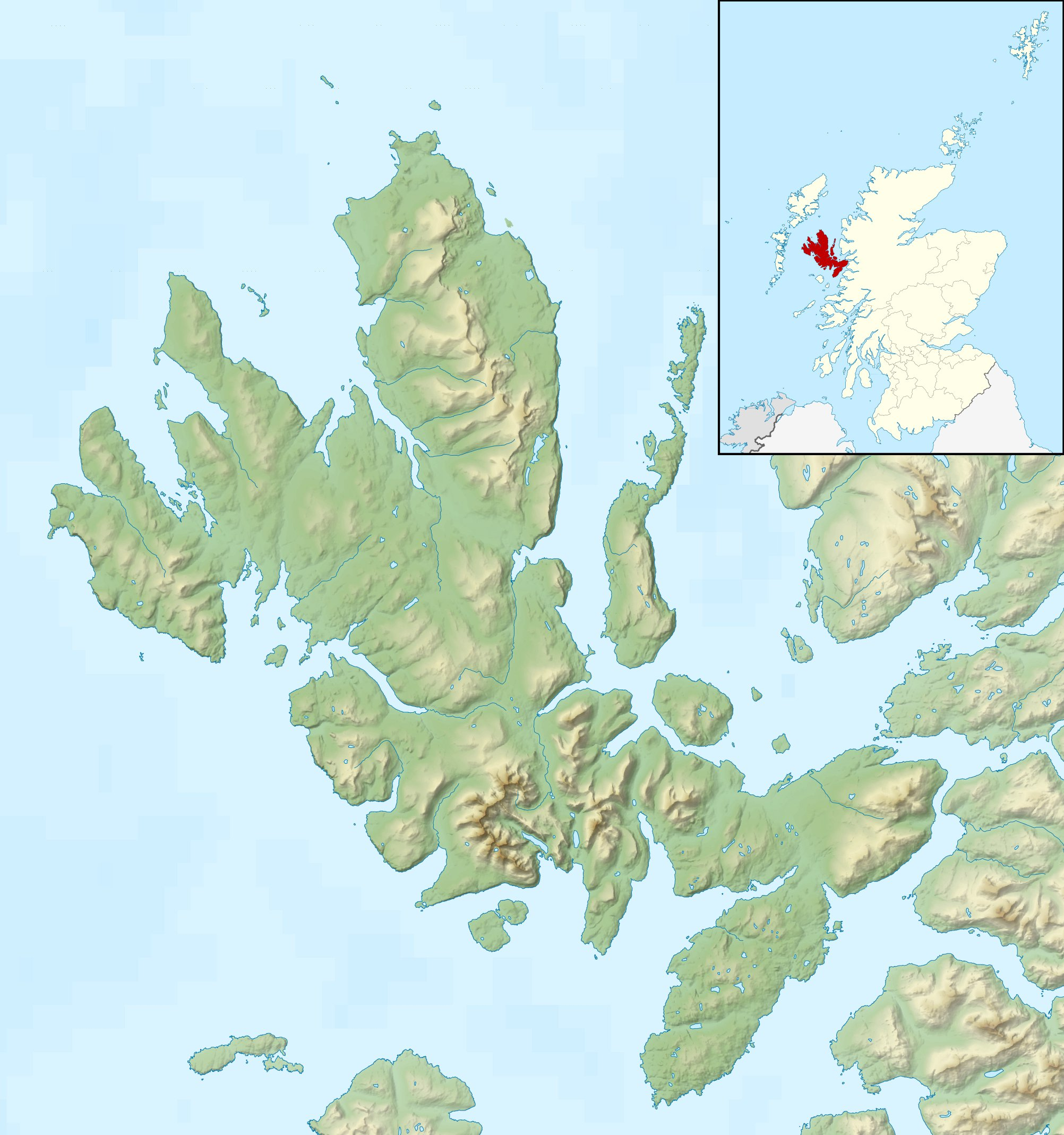
- Soay shown within the Skye area
- OS grid reference: NG443145
- Coordinates: 57.15°N 6.23°W

Name
- Name meaning: Sheep Island
- Old Norse name: *Sauða-ey

Physical geography
- Island group: Skye
- Area: 1,036 ha (4 sq mi)
- Area rank: 49
- Highest elevation: Beinn Bhreac, 141 m (463 ft)

Administration
- Council area: Highland
- Country: Scotland
- Sovereign state: United Kingdom

Demographics
- Population: 3
- Population rank: 85=
- Population density: 0.29/km^{2} (0.75/sq mi)
- Largest settlement: Mol-chlach

Soay (Scottish Gaelic: Sòdhaigh, pronounced [ˈs̪ɔː.aj]) is an island just off the coast of Skye, in the Inner Hebrides of Scotland.

== Geography ==
Soay lies to the west of Loch Scavaig on the south-west coast of Skye, from which it is separated by Soay Sound. Unlike its neighbours Skye and Rùm, Soay is low-lying, reaching 141 metres (463 ft) at Beinn Bhreac. The dumb-bell shaped island is virtually cut in half by inlets that form Soay Harbour (north) and the main bay, Camas nan Gall (to the south). The main settlement, Mol-chlach, is on the shore of Camas nan Gall. It is normally reached by boat from Elgol. The island is part of the Cuillin Hills National Scenic Area, one of 40 in Scotland.

== History ==
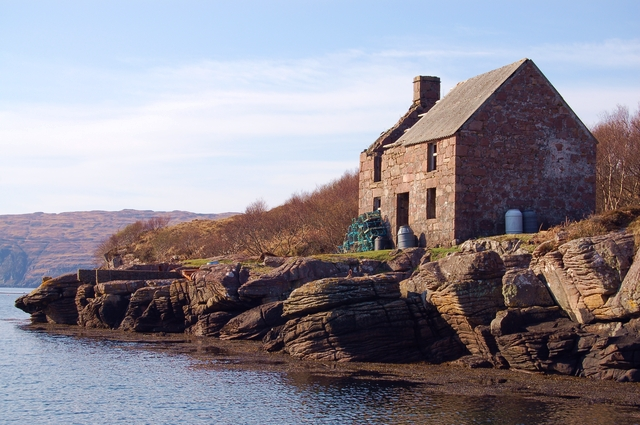
Former HQ of The Island of Soay Shark Fisheries Ltd, started – and finished – by Gavin Maxwell

The name derives from Old Norse Sauða-ey meaning Sheep Island. Camas nan Gall (G: Bay of Foreigners) is probably named after the Norse invaders, after whom the Hebrides (Na h-Innse Gall) are also named.

The population peaked at 158 in 1851, following eviction of crofters from Skye in the Highland Clearances.

The Annual Reports of the Fishery Board for Scotland provide an insight into the state of fishing from Soay in the years before the First World War.

Fishery Statistics

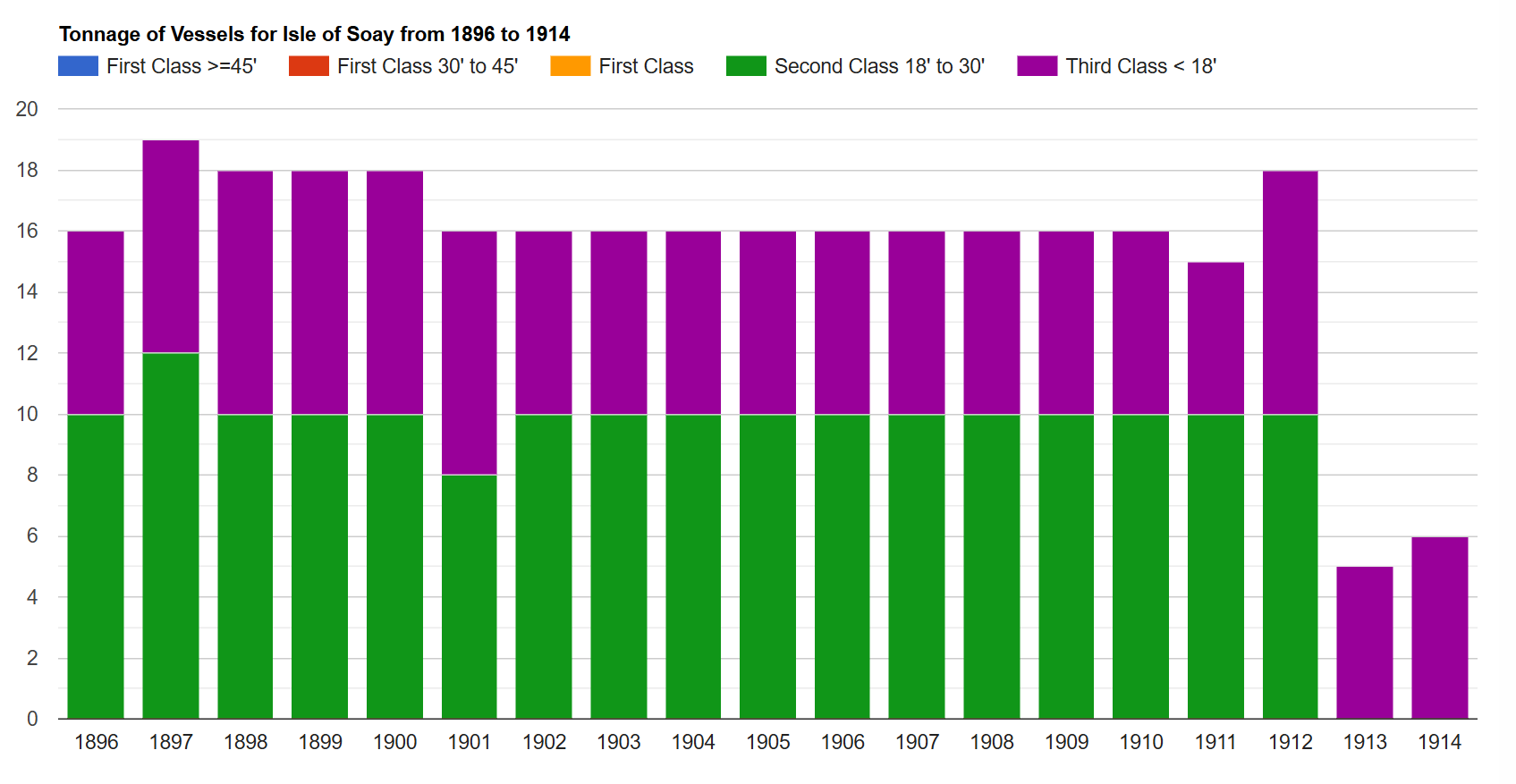
Tonnage of vessels

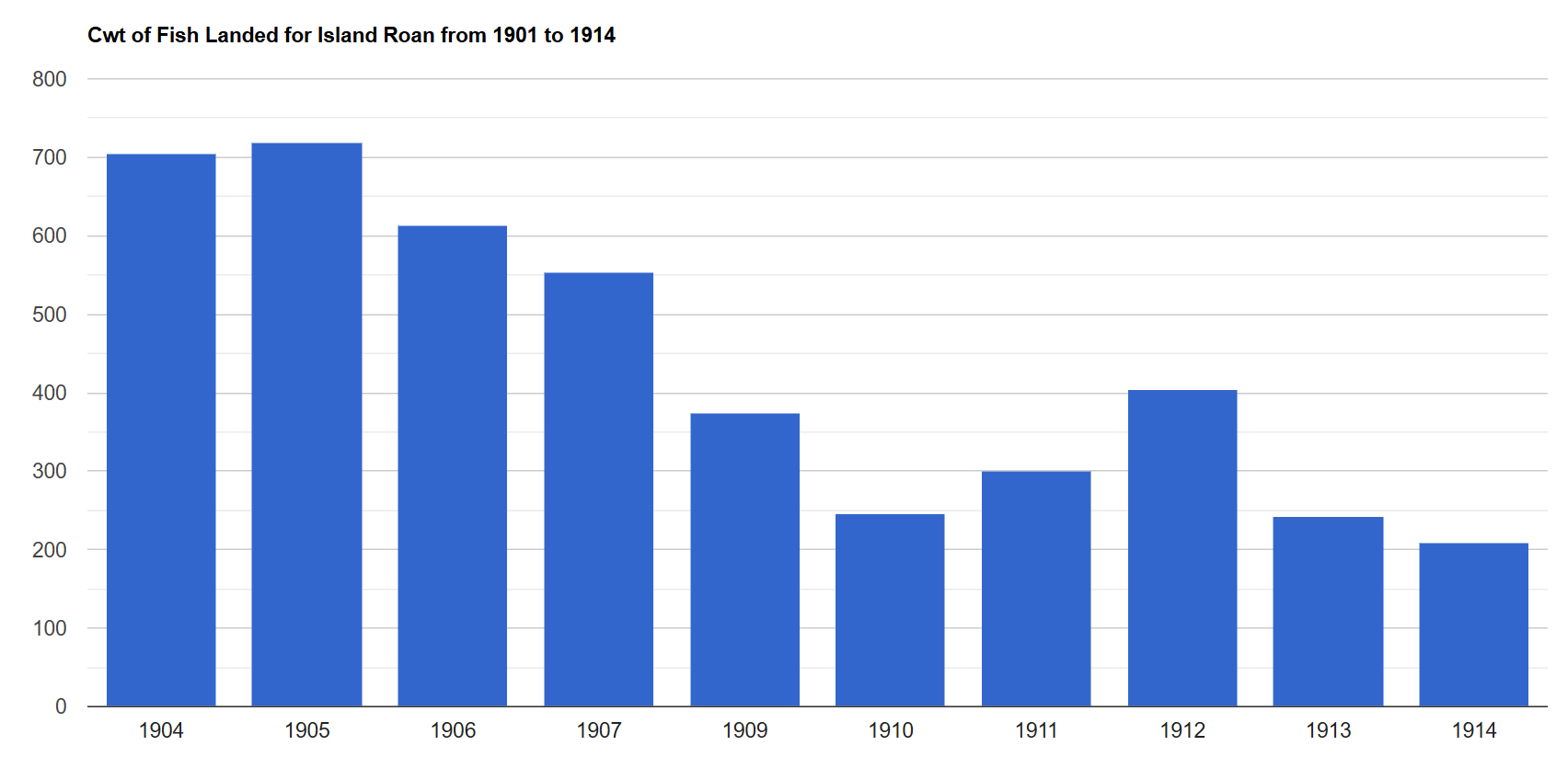
Cwt of fish landed

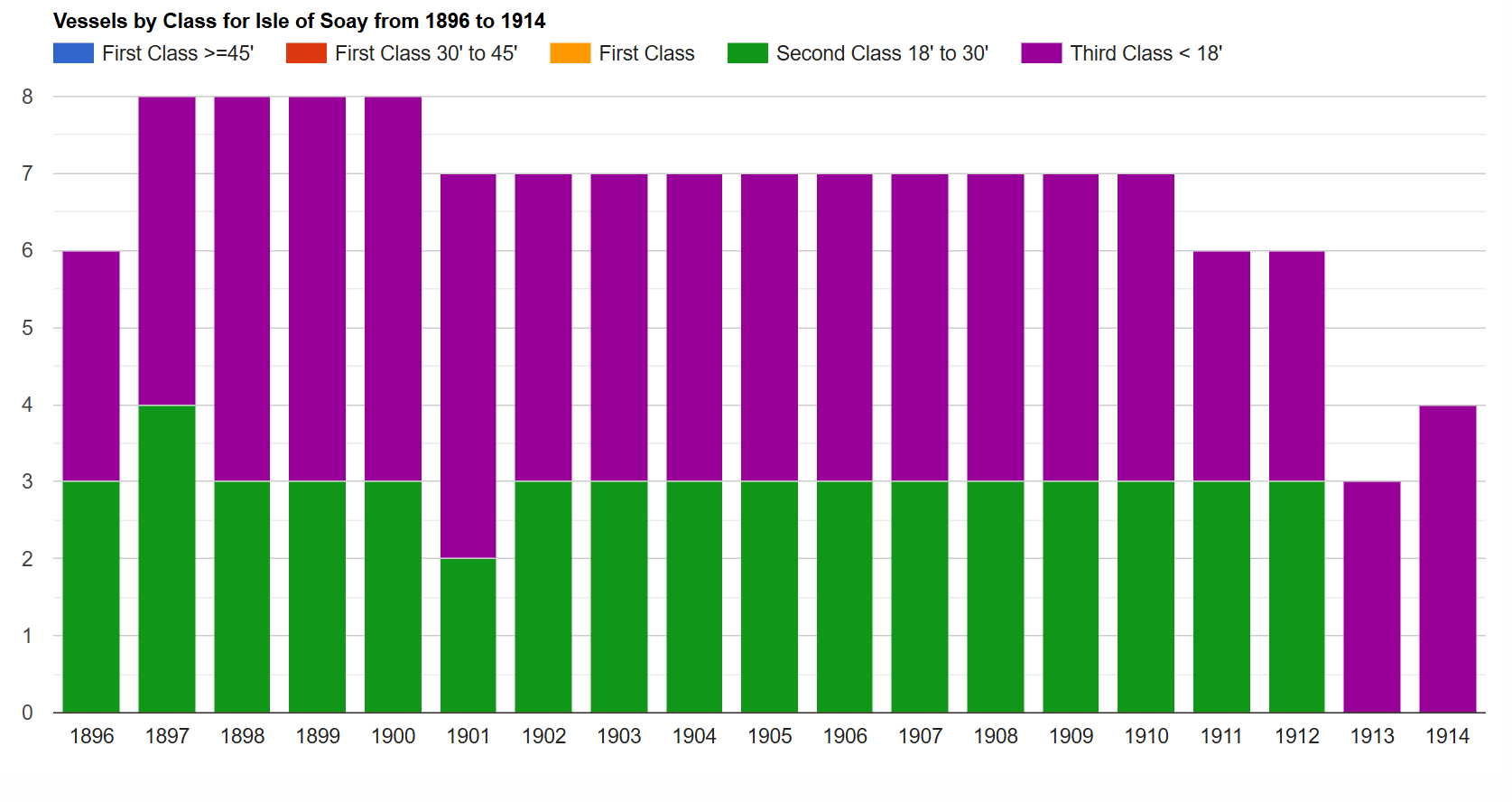
Vessels by class

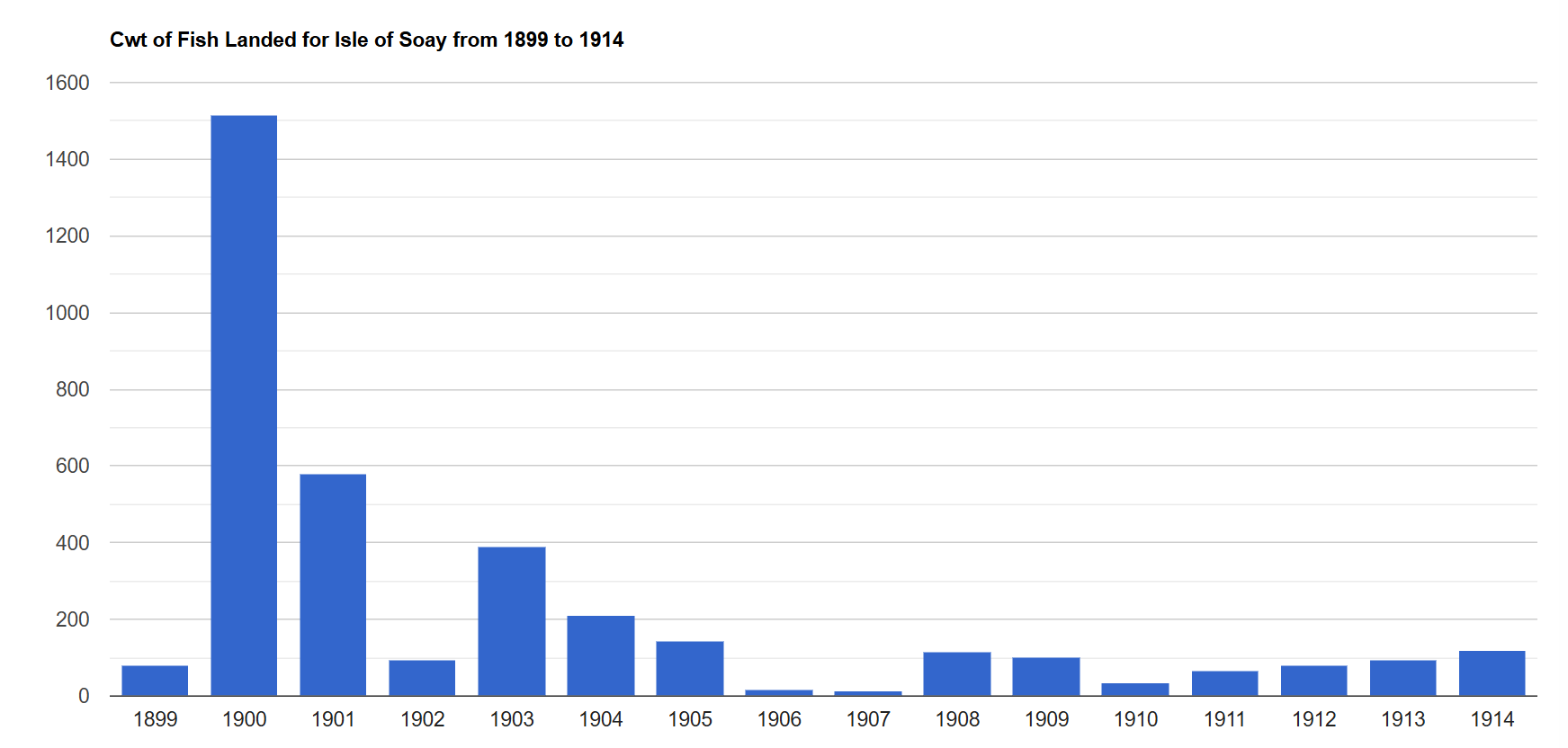
Value (£) of fish landed

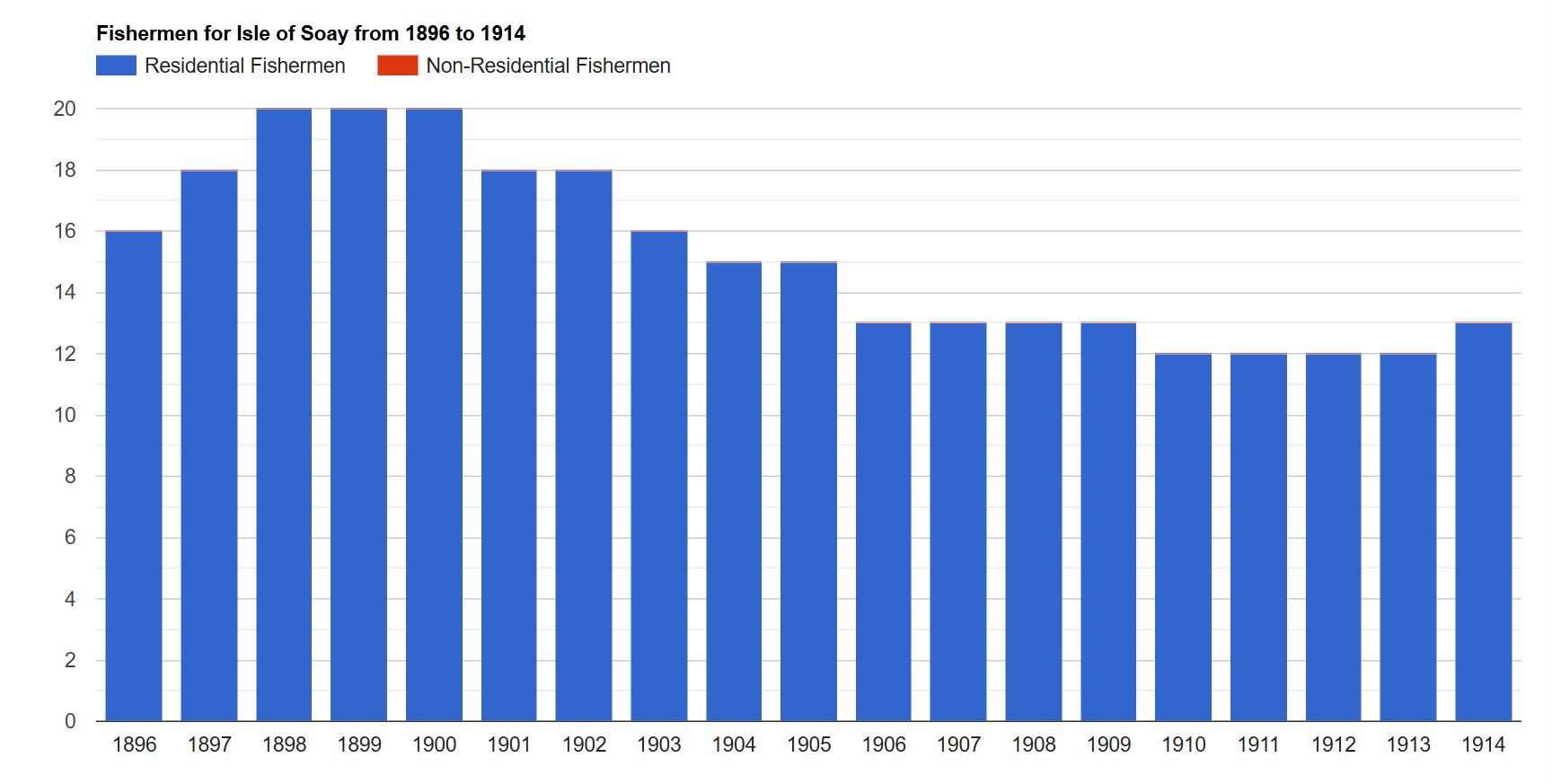
Fishermen

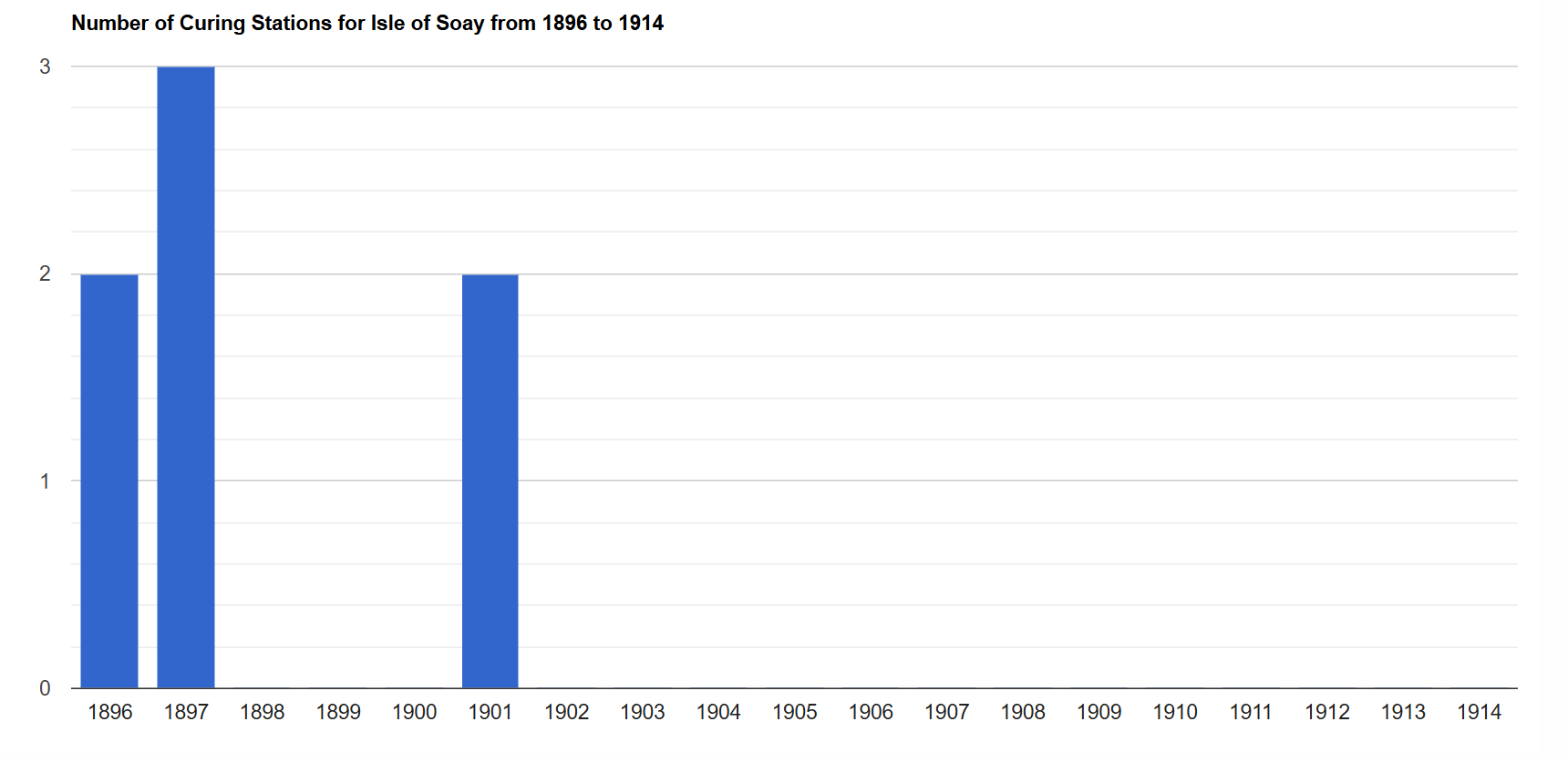
Placeholder- no curing stations

In 1946, author Gavin Maxwell bought the island and established a factory to process shark oil from basking sharks. The enterprise was unsuccessful, lasting just three years. Maxwell wrote about it in his book Harpoon at a Venture. After the failure of the business the island was sold on to Maxwell's business partner's wife (Jeanne Geddes), Tex Geddes. The island had the first solar-powered telephone exchange in the world.

Previously mainly Scottish Gaelic-speaking, most of the population was evacuated, at their request, to Mull on 20 June 1953 due to the poor ferry schedule in the winter when it was frequently cancelled due to bad weather, since then the island has been sparsely populated. In 2001 the population was 7. By 2003 this had dwindled to 2 and the usually resident population at the 2011 and 2022 censuses was three.

== Stamps ==
Local stamps were issued for Soay between 1965 and 1967, all on the Europa theme, some being overprinted to commemorate Sir Winston Churchill. As the stamps were produced without the owner's permission, they are regarded as bogus.

== See also ==
- List of islands of Scotland
