= Lili Pohlmann =

Holocaust survivor and educator (1930–2021)

Lili Stern-Pohlmann MBE
- Born: Lili Stern; 29 March 1930; Lvov, Poland
- Died: 15 September 2021 (aged 91)
- Occupation: Holocaust educator
- Spouse: Eric Pohlmann

Lili Stern-Pohlmann MBE (29 March 1930 – 15 September 2021) was a Holocaust survivor and educator.

== Early life ==
Lili Stern was born in Lviv and raised in Kraków, the daughter of Filip Stern and Cecylia Bruek Stern. Her father was a bank manager and her mother was a dressmaker. She and her mother were the only members of their large extended family to survive the Holocaust. They were sheltered by a German civil servant, Irmgard Wieth, until Ukrainian Greek Catholic archbishop Andrey Sheptytsky placed them in a Ukrainian convent to protect them. After the war, she was taken to London with other refugee children by Rabbi Solomon Schonfeld in 1946. Her mother joined her in 1947.

== Career ==
Pohlmann taught and spoke about her experiences during World War II, working with the Association of Jewish Refugees, the Holocaust Educational Trust, the Imperial War Museum, and other British groups. She was honorary president of Learning from the Righteous, and a director of the Centre for Jewish Culture in Kraków. She was awarded the Commander's Cross of Polonia Restituta, and became a member of the Order of the British Empire in 2020, "for services to Holocaust Education, Awareness and Human Relations". "If we, the last generation, don't talk about it, then that's it," she explained of her work. "I owe it to posterity."

== Personal life ==
Lili Stern married Austrian actor Eric Pohlmann. He died in 1979. Her partner from 1985 was Ian Fleming's literary agent, Peter Janson-Smith; he died in 2016. She had a daughter, Karen. Stern-Pohlmann died in 2021, aged 91 years.
