= Skoob Books =

Secondhand bookshop in central London, England

Coordinates: 51.5251°N 0.1245°W

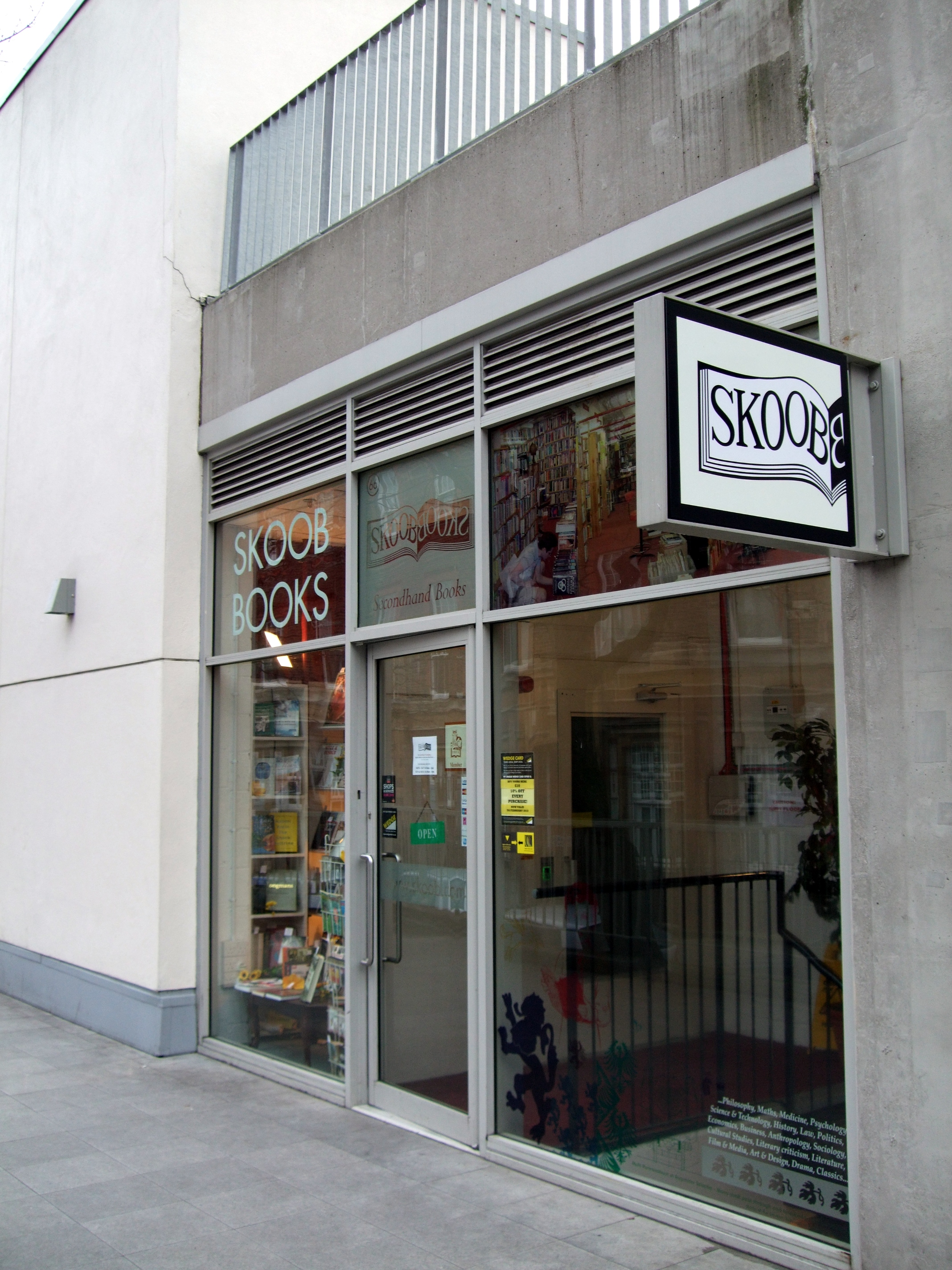
- Type: Private
- Industry: Retail; Bookshop
- Founded: 2008
- Headquarters: 66 The Brunswick, off Marchmont St, London, WC1N 1AE, UK
- Number of locations: 1 shop
- Area served: London, UK
- Products: Books
- Website: Skoob Books

Skoob Books is a bookshop selling secondhand books focusing on academic subjects, located in the Brunswick Centre, in Bloomsbury, central London, UK.

== Overview ==
Skoob Books has over 70,000 titles within their two shops and around 100,000 online. The shops are based in a basement of the Brunswick Centre and in a retail space on its ground floor. It has secondhand works on politics, history, literature, art, philosophy, to the natural sciences.

Included within this are also postcards and photographs.

The main shop itself is underground, sprawling out into distinct sections from sci-fi, social sciences, arts, and natural sciences.

Its warehouse is based in Oxfordshire where it holds over a million books.

== History ==
Skoob Books originally (1979) started in Sicilian Avenue while Pooles Books was closing down, by staff from the Tottenham Court Road shop. Later they moved to a ground floor unit at the Brunswick Centre. Subsequently the shop moved to the basement of the centre in 2008.

During the COVID-19 pandemic, Skoob Books opened their ground floor retail unit once more as a pop-up shop.

In 2010, the Times Out magazine voted Skoob Books "the best bookshop in London".

== Gallery ==
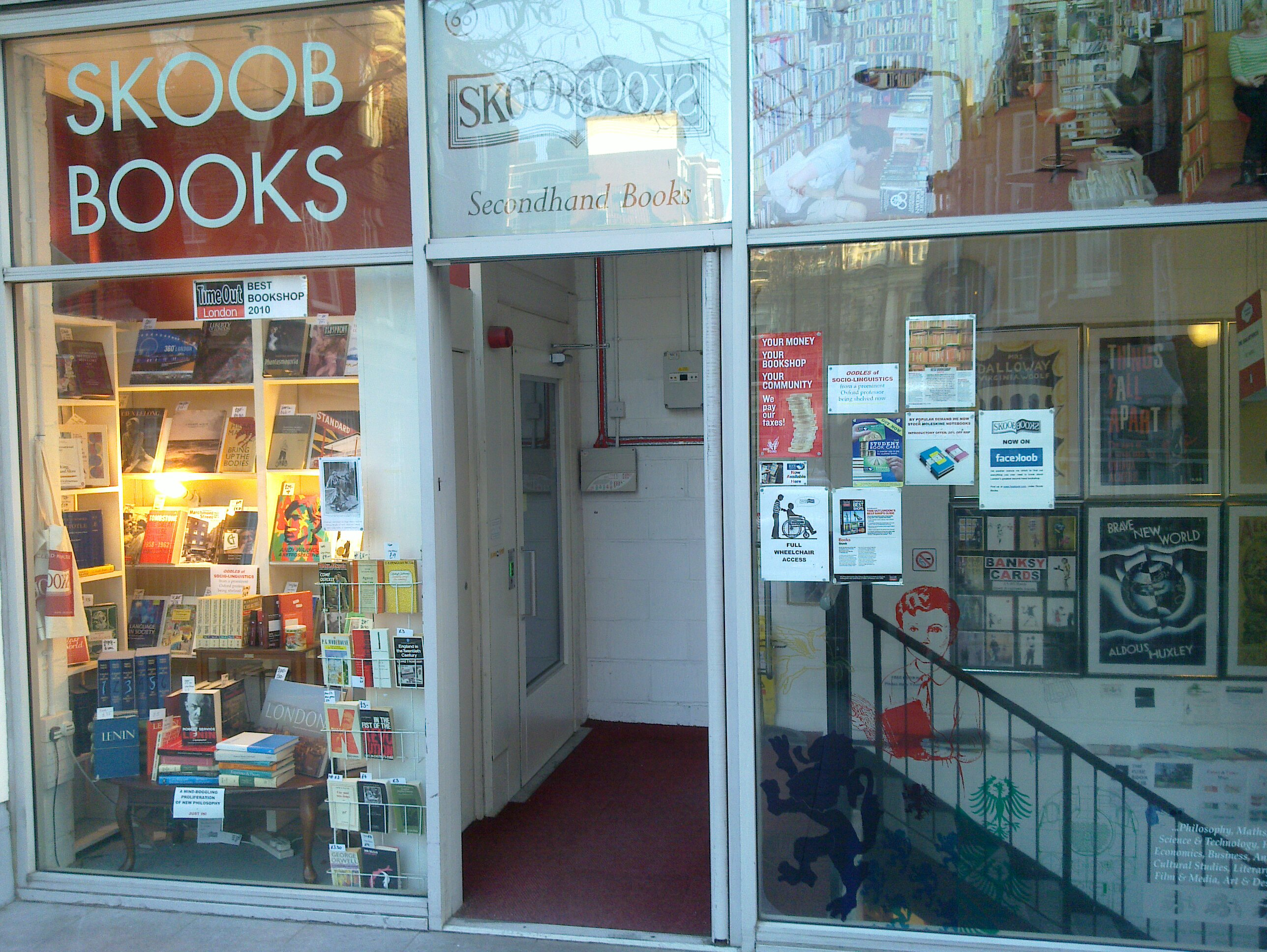
Skoob Books' front door.

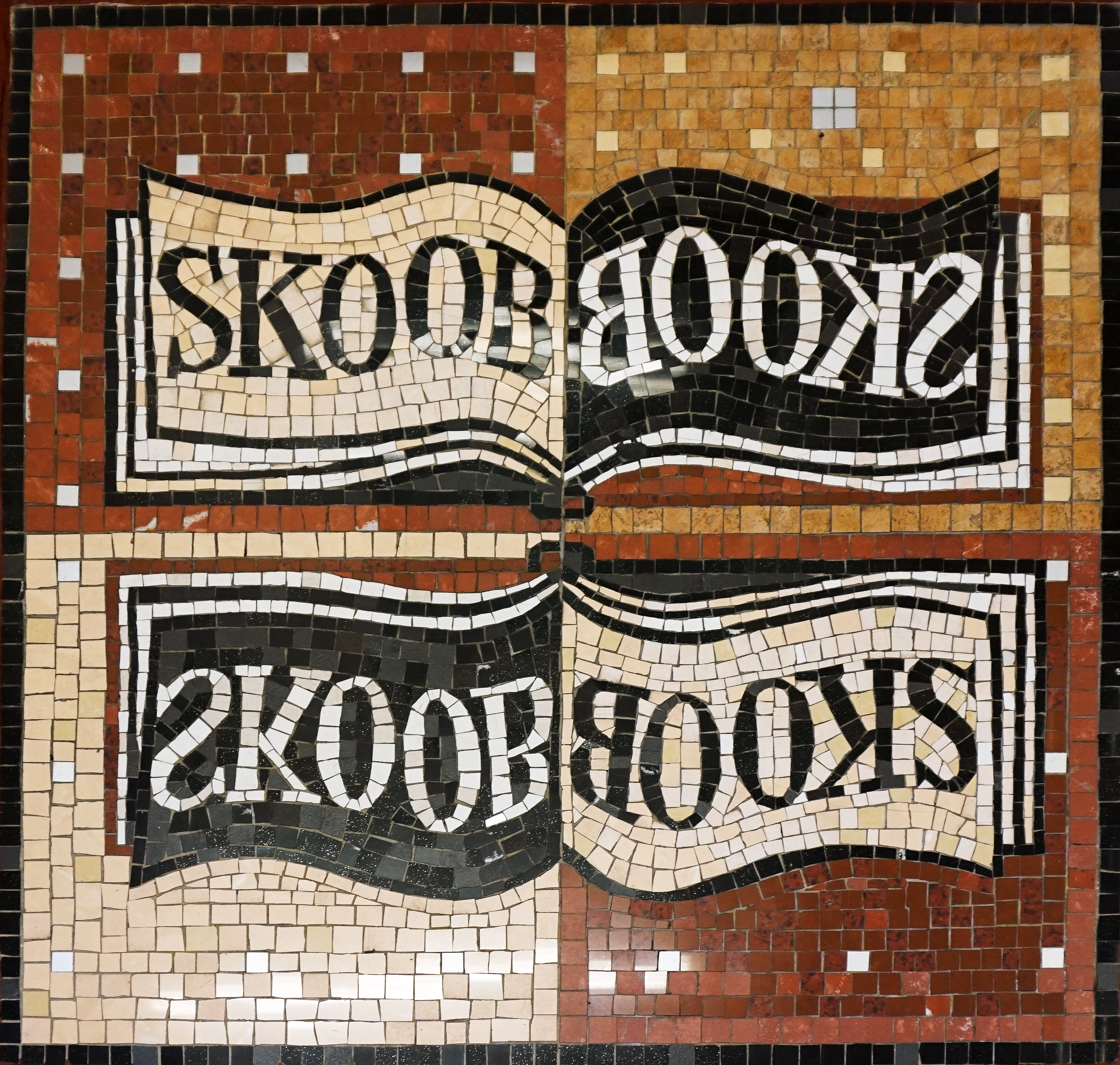
Floor mosaic showing the Skoob Books' logo.
