= Margaret Pope (journalist and anticolonial activist) =

British journalist and anti-colonial activist (born 1918)

Margaret Pope (1918–?), was a British journalist and anti-colonial activist. In the late 1940s and early 1950s, she lived in North Africa and worked on behalf of the Moroccan and Algerian independence movements, up until Algerian independence in 1962. She remained in North Africa and worked in radio until 1965.

== Biography ==
Margaret Pope was born in Hawarden, UK in 1918. In the 1930s, she supported Maude Royden's peace activism, and traveled to Mandatory Palestine.

After the Second World War, Pope lived in Cairo, where she produced English-language publicity for the Algerian, Tunisian, and Moroccan nationalists at the Office of the Arab Maghreb. She travelled frequently between Cairo and Tangiers, and sometimes carried messages into Europe for North African nationalists. She moved to Tangier in 1950, and worked closely with Moroccan nationalists Mohammed al-Fasi and Allal al-Fasi. In 1953, she attended the Asian Socialist Conference in Burma, on behalf of Morocco's Istiqlal Party.

After Moroccan independence in 1956, she worked in Rabat as an English-language broadcaster for Radio Maroc, and continued to act as a networker and publicity agent on behalf of the Algerian FLN. She claimed to have inspired Gavin Maxwell to write Lords of the Atlas : the rise and fall of the House of Glaoua, 1893-1956.

After Algerian independence in 1962, she resided in Algeria, but was expelled in 1965.

== Bibliography ==
- Pope, Margaret (1946). ABCs of the Arab World. London: Socialist Book Centre.
