= John Lister-Kaye =

English naturalist, conservationist, and author

Sir John Lister-Kaye Bt OBE
- Born: 8 May 1946 (age 80); Wakefield, Yorkshire, England
- Occupations: conservationist; lecturer; nature writer; businessman
- Spouses: Lady Sorrel Bentinck (m. 1972; div. 1988) Lucinda, Baroness Burton (after 1989)
- Children: 4
- Parent(s): Sir John Lister-Kaye, Bt; Audrey Helen Carter

Sir John Philip Lister Lister-Kaye, 8th Baronet, OBE (born 8 May 1946) is an English naturalist, conservationist, author who is owner and director of the Aigas Field Centre, among other business interests. He is married with four children and has lived in the Highlands of Scotland since 1969.

== Early life ==
Lister-Kaye was born on 8 May 1946 at Wakefield in Yorkshire and is the son of Sir John Lister-Kaye, 7th Baronet and the former Audrey Helen Carter. His older sister, Mary Eugenia Helen Lister-Kaye, is the wife of Nigel Carrel.

He was born into an ancient established family who for many generations had been Yorkshire landowners, distinguished political figures and successful industrialists with interests in both quarrying and mining. Reportedly, John's early fascination with natural history was something his family hoped he would eventually grow out of. In 1959, at the age of 13, his parents sent him to Allhallows School, near Lyme Regis in Dorset. This was situated within an 800-acre (3.2 km^{2}) national nature reserve and near the wilderness of the Lyme Regis landslip (to which he returned with his daughter, as documented in Nature's Child). After five years in such an environment Lister-Kaye's love of nature was deep and permanent.

After leaving school in 1964, Lister-Kaye worked in the steel industry at Port Talbot in Wales, initially as a management trainee, and continuing until 1969. He has claimed he was persuaded against his wishes to accept the post.

== Career ==
After witnessing the ecological disaster that resulted from the sinking of the supertanker Torrey Canyon [off the Isles of Scilly] in 1967, Lister-Kaye then knew that a long-term career in industry was not for him. In 1968 he was invited by naturalist and author Gavin Maxwell, to move to Maxwell's home on Eilean Bàn (White Island) in the Scottish Highlands, to help him work on a book about British wild mammals and to assist with a project to build a private zoo on the island. Lister-Kaye readily accepted Maxwell's invitation, resigned from his job, and moved to Scotland in 1969. After Maxwell's unexpected death from cancer later that same year, both the book and the zoo project had to be abandoned. Rather than return to a career in industry he remained in Scotland and went into isolation to write a book about the short but eventful time he had spent with Maxwell on Eilean Bàn. His acclaimed first book, The White Island, was published by Longman in 1972. It has remained in print for 30 years.

In 1970, after the completion of The White Island, Lister-Kaye formed Highland Wildlife Enterprises, a natural history guiding service based at the village of Drumnadrochit, near Loch Ness. Initially he was assisted in the venture by friend and ex-employee of Gavin Maxwell, Richard Frere. Two years later this was to become Scotland's first field studies centre, and in 1972, Lister-Kaye and the field centre moved to a remote strath near Glen Affric.

Four years after his marriage, needing to accommodate a growing family and to be able to extend the facilities of the field centre, Lister-Kaye persuaded Inverness-shire County Council to sell him the remains of a Victorian sporting estate near Beauly called Aigas, which had previously been used by the council as an old people's home. In 1977, the Aigas Field Centre was opened by Sir Frank Fraser Darling, Scotland's most celebrated ecologist.

Lister-Kaye was commissioned to write a Penguin Special 'SealCull' (published 1979) on the political row that surrounded a proposal by the UK government to cull thousands of grey seals off the coast of Scotland. The book was adopted by Aberdeen University as a conservation and zoology textbook, cementing Lister-Kaye's reputation as a writer on nature and wildlife and career in the Highlands.

Lister-Kaye's second autobiographical work, The Seeing Eye: Notes of a Highland Naturalist, which was published by Allen Lane in 1979, continues the story of his life from when he left Eilean Bàn in 1970 up until his purchase of Aigas in 1976. In his third, the best-sellingSong of the Rolling Earth: A Highland Odyssey, published in 2003, Lister-Kaye chronicles the place Aigas from the Bronze Age to development of Aigas Field Centre from its humble beginnings to what has become Scotland's premier field centre, winning international awards for environmental education and hosting travel study groups from all over the world. The book's success was to establish Lister-Kaye as one of the UK's foremost nature writers.

A novel One for Sorrow followed in 1994 published by Balnain. It is a real life environmental saga, murder mystery based in the Highlands. In 2003 Lister-Kaye was appointed a Times columnist; as well as contributing features and articles to a wide variety of publications. A subsequent technical paper discussing land use paper for Scottish Natural Heritage, 'Ill Fares the Land' predicted the demise of the Highlands forecasting its current ecological predicament. A foreword by the Prince of Wales did nothing to alleviate his concerns, despite sharing a profound interest in organic sustainability for landscape cultivation.

Lister-Kaye's seventh book is the sequel to Song of the Rolling Earth, 'Nature's Child – Encounters with Wonders of the Natural World' (Time Warner 2004), and is about exciting expeditions and adventures with his youngest daughter Hermione. His eighth is 'At the Water's Edge' published by Canongate in 2010, subtitled 'A Personal Quest for Wildness.'

In 2000, to celebrate the millennium Lister-Kaye took ten members of his family and Aigas Field centre staff on an expedition to follow the footsteps of Laurens van der Post's across the Kalahari Desert (recounted in Nature's Child). In 2008, with his son Warwick and daughter Hermione, Lister-Kaye mounted a private Land Rover expedition up 8,000 miles of Africa's Great Rift Valley from Malawi to Ethiopia to explore and write about the human ecology of the seven countries they passed through. They returned to Scotland in time for the official opening in 2009 of Aigas Field Centre's new environmental education centre by Prince Charles, Duke of Rothesay, and the Duchess of Rothesay.

== Personal life ==
On 24 June 1972, he was married to Lady Sorrel Deidre Bentinck, a daughter of Henry Bentinck (who later became Earl of Portland). Before they were divorced in 1988, they were the parents of:

- John Warwick Noel Lister-Kaye (born 1974)
- Melanie Jenifer Lister-Kaye (born 1976), a twin.
- Amelia Helen Lister-Kaye (born 1976), a twin.

He married, secondly, Lucinda Anne (née Law), daughter of Robert Law, on 17 February 1989. Lucinda was previously married to the 4th Baron Burton with whom she had three children. Together, John and Lucinda had one child:

- Hermione Anne Lucinda Lorne Lister-Kaye (born 1990)

=== Honours and awards ===
In 1989 Lister-Kaye was appointed to the board of the Nature Conservancy Council, later the Nature Conservancy Council for Scotland (1990) and was appointed the first Regional chairman for the Highlands & Islands of Scotland for Scottish Natural Heritage in 1991. He has also served as Chairman of the Royal Society for the Protection of Birds in Scotland, President of the Scottish Wildlife Trust, the Forestry Commission, and the UK's Environmental Training Agency, and is Vice-President of the Association for the Protection of Rural Scotland.

In 1983 John Lister-Kaye was awarded the Wilderness Society's Gold Award for environmental education for the work of his field studies centre. In 2003 he was appointed OBE for services to the Scottish environment, in 1995 received an honorary doctorate from the University of Stirling and was awarded Honorary Membership of the Scottish Wildlife Trust. In 2006 he received an honorary doctorate from the University of St Andrews, and was made a Vice-President of the RSPB.In 2016 he was awarded the Royal Scottish Geographical Society's Geddes Environment Medal for services to nature conservation and environmental education and made an honorary fellow of RSGS.

== Own publications ==
- The White Island. Longman. 1972. ISBN 0-582-10903-5.
- Seal Cull: The Grey Seal Controversy. Penguin Books. 1979. ISBN 0-14-052336-7. (paperback)
- The Seeing Eye: Notes of a Highland Naturalist. Allen Lane. 1980. ISBN 0-7139-1306-1. (illustrated by Sarah Norton)
- Ill Fares The Land – A Sustainable Land Ethic for the Sporting Estates of the Highlands and Islands (Occasional Paper No. 3). Scottish Natural Heritage. 1994.
- One for Sorrow. Balnain Books. 1994. ISBN 1-872557-36-8.
- Song of the Rolling Earth: A Highland Odyssey. Time Warner Books. 2003. ISBN 0-316-86176-6.
- Nature's Child. Little Brown. 2004. ISBN 0-316-72731-8.
- At The Water's Edge, A Personal Quest for Wildness. Canongate. 2010. ISBN 978-1-84767-404-3.
- Gods of the Morning: A Bird's Eye View of a Highland Year. Canongate Books. 2015. ISBN 978-1782114154.
- Lister-Kaye, John (2017). The Dun Cow Rib: A Very Natural Childhood. Canongate books.

== Primary sources ==
- Lister-Kaye, John (1972). The White Island. Longman. ISBN 0-582-10903-5.
- Lister-Kaye, John (1980). The Seeing Eye. Allen Lane. ISBN 0-7139-1306-1.
- Lister-Kaye, John (2004). Song of the Rolling Earth. Abacus. ISBN 0-349-11761-6.

== Notes ==
Baronetage of the United Kingdom
| Preceded by John Christopher Lister Lister-Kaye | Baronet (of Grange); 1982–present | Incumbent |
