= Deer forest =

Deer hunting estate in Scotland

The deer forest (Gaelic: frìth) is a sporting estate which is kept and managed largely or solely for the purposes of maintaining a resident population of red deer for sporting (deer stalking) purposes. It is an institution and phenomenon peculiar to the Highlands of Scotland.

Typically, deer forests are in hilly and mountainous areas of the Highlands and Islands; and, despite the use of the term "forest" they are almost all devoid of trees - the word is used here in its original sense, meaning an area set aside for hunting, rather than its later association with trees (see Royal Forest). The land is typically not suitable for crops. Most deer forests have large areas covered with heath, in many places peat bogs, marshes, lochs or bare rock, elsewhere patches of grass or other herbage, while plantations of trees of greater or less extent may also occur. They usually extend to 10,000 acres (40 km^{2}) and more, and deer which live there belong to the small-bodied, hill-dwelling race of red deer typical of northern Scotland, which have adapted to life on open hills after the loss of woodland habitat.

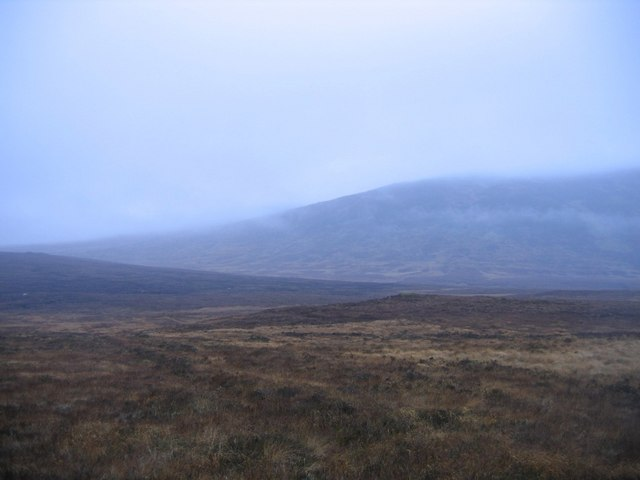
Craiganour deer forest

Most deer forests are not fenced or enclosed in any way, and the deer can move freely across large tracts of hill country. Boundaries, referred to as marches, are usually marked by a river, stream, ridge, shoreline or similar natural feature. Hind forests and stag forests are so called because of the tendencies of red deer to form large, single-sex herds outside the autumn rutting time, and most forests hold either a resident stag herd or a hind herd for much of the year.

In deer forest, the term forest is derived from the ancient and medieval use of the Latin word foris - "open" or "waste", to denote an extensive outdoor "waste area" kept as a hunting preserve.

Scotland's deer forests are almost all privately owned and managed, although a few once-distinguished forests such as Torridon and Glenfeshie have moved into semi-public ownership via bodies such as the National Trust for Scotland, the Royal Society for the Protection of Birds and the Ministry of Defence, and sporting deer stalking is no longer carried on there.

Some deer forests are retained in the hands of their proprietors, while many others are rented out, either for the shooting season or for a period of years, and in this case, may bring a large rental to their owners. A person who rents the ground pays a fee for every stag killed. A deer forest is always an expensive affair, not only for the rent that has to be paid, but also for the number of keepers, guides, watchers, beaters, etc., that have to be employed in connection with it.

A comprehensive account of nearly all the deer forests in their late Victorian heyday is provided by Grimble (1896)

== List of deer forests ==
- Aberarder Forest
- Aberchalder Forest
- Achentoul Forest
- Achnashellach Forest
- Amat Forest
- Applecross Forest
- Ardverikie Forest
- Attadale Forest
- Badanloch Forest
- Balmacaan Forest
- Balmoral Forest
- Balmore Forest
- Barrisdale Forest
- Beinneun Forest
- Ben Alder Forest
- Ben Armine Forest
- Ben Damh Forest
- Benmore Forest
- Blackwater Forest
- Boblainy Forest
- Braemore Forest
- Braeroy Forest
- Bunloinn Forest
- Cabaan Forest
- Caenlochan Forest
- Ceannacroc Forest
- Cluanie Forest
- Coignafearn Forest
- Corriehallie Forest
- Corriemoillie Forest
- Corrieyairack Forest
- Corour Forest
- Coulin Forest
- Craiganour Forest
- Culachy Forest
- Dalnacardoch Forest
- Dalnamein Forest
- Diebidale Forest
- Dalnaspidal Forest
- Drumrunie Forest
- Dundonnell Forest
- Dundreggan Forest
- East Benula Forest
- East Glenquoich Forest
- East Monar Forest
- Erchless Forest
- Fannich Forest
- Fasnakyle Forest
- Fisherfield Forest
- Flowerdale Forest
- Forest of Atholl
- Forest of Birse
- Forest of Glenartney
- Forest of Glenavon
- Forest of Harris
- Forest of Mar
- Freevater Forest
- Gaick Forest
- Garbat Forest
- Glen Affric Forest
- Glencalvie Forest
- Glencanisp Forest
- Glencannich Forest
- Glencarron and Glenuig Forest
- Glendoe Forest
- Glendhu Forest
- Glenfeshie Forest - no longer managed for deer stalking
- Glenfiddich Forest
- Glengarry Forest
- Glenquoich Forest
- Glenshiel Forest
- Glenshieldaig Forest
- Glenshirra Forest
- Glen Strathfarrar Forest
- Guisachan Forest
- Inchbae Forest
- Inchnacardoch Forest
- Inchnadamph Forest
- Inverinate Forest
- Inverlael Forest
- Inverpolly Forest
- Inverwick Forest
- Kildermorie Forest
- Killiechonate Forest
- Killilan Forest
- Kinlochewe Forest
- Kinlochhourn Forest
- Kinlochluichart Forest
- Kintail Forest - owned by the National Trust for Scotland and no longer managed for deer stalking
- Kinveachy Forest
- Langwell Forest
- Leanachan Forest
- Ledgowan Forest
- Letterewe Forest
- Levishie Forest
- Locheil Forest
- Loch Choire Forest
- Lochrosque Forest
- Mamore Forest
- Morsgail Forest, Lewis
- Moy Forest
- Portclair Forest
- Rannoch Forest
- Reay Forest - owned by the Grosvenor Group
- Rhidorroch Forest
- Royal Forest
- Sherramore Forest
- Shieldaig Forest
- South Harris Forest
- Strathconon Forest
- Strathgarve Forest
- Strathnasheallag Forest
- Strathvaich Forest
- Struy Forest
- Talla Bheith Forest
- The Queens Forest
- Tollomuick Forest
- Torridon Forest - no longer managed for deer stalking
- Tummel Forest
- West Benula Forest - portions including the lodge inundated by the Loch Mullardoch project
- West Monar Forest
- Wyvis Forest
