= Càrn Eighe =

Mountain in Scotland

Coordinates: 57.288438°N 5.114053°W

Carn Eighe
- Càrn Èite
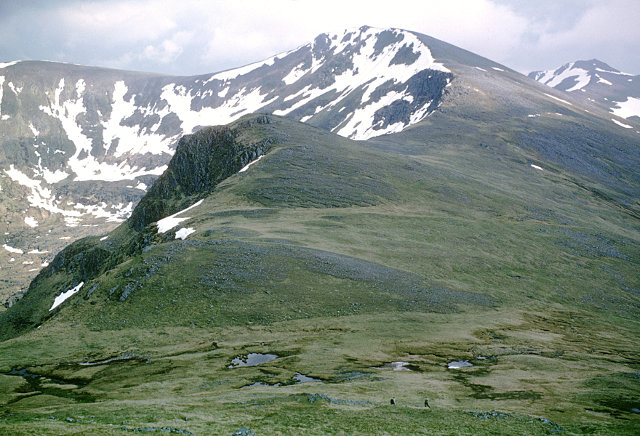
- Càrn Eighe seen from Bealach Beag to the north, with Stob Coire Lochan in the foreground

Highest point
- Elevation: 1,183 m (3,881 ft)
- Prominence: 1,147 m Ranked 2nd in British Isles
- Parent peak: Ben Nevis
- Listing: Marilyn, Munro, Ribu, County top (Ross and Cromarty)

Naming
- Language of name: Gaelic
- Pronunciation: Scottish Gaelic: [ˈkʰaːrˠn̪ˠ ˈetʲə]

Geography
- Location: Glen Affric, Scotland
- OS grid: NH123262
- Topo map: OS Landranger 25

Carn Eighe (Scottish Gaelic: Càrn Èite) is a mountain in the Northwest Highlands of Scotland. Rising to 1,183 metres (3,881 ft) above sea level, it is the highest mountain in Scotland north of the Great Glen, the twelfth-highest in the British Isles, and, in terms of relative height (topographic prominence), it is the second-tallest mountain in the British Isles after Ben Nevis (its "parent peak" for determination of topographic prominence). Carn Eighe lies between Glen Affric and Loch Mullardoch, and is at the heart of a massif along with its twin peak, the 1,181-metre (3,875 ft) Mam Sodhail.

Administratively, it is in the Highland council area, on the boundary between the historic counties of Inverness and Ross and Cromarty, on the former lands of the Clan Chisholm. The mountain is not easy to access, being ten kilometres (6 mi) from the nearest road. Another prominent peak to the north, Beinn Fhionnlaidh, is even less accessible.

== Name ==
The name "Carn Eighe", formerly spelled "Carn Eige" on Ordnance Survey maps, comes from Scottish Gaelic and has been interpreted as meaning "file peak" or "notch hill". However, according to Ainmean-Àite na h-Alba, the original Gaelic name is Càrn Èite.

== Landscape ==
The summit is pyramid-shaped, the culmination of three ridges meeting. The nearest Munro is its "twin summit", Mam Sodhail, about one kilometre (5/8 mi) to the southwest, and there are three other Munros on the massif. Beinn Fhionnlaidh ends a spur to the north, and there is a much longer grassy ridge running out to the east, which after 4.5 km (2 3/4 mi) leads to Tom a' Choinnich (1,112 m or 3,648 ft) and then after a similar distance culminates in the rather bland summit of Toll Creagach, at 1,054 metres (3,458 ft). As well as the five Munros topping the massif, there are a further ten minor summits, known as "Munro Tops".

This ridge lies roughly midway between two lochs, Loch Affric/Loch Beinn a' Mheadhoin to the south, and the larger Loch Mullardoch to the north. Opposing several lower summits across Loch Mullardoch, the highest being Sgurr na Lapaich at 1,152 metres (3,780 ft), it dominates the area, being the highest summit in the region. To the north of the summit, there is an impressive glacial corrie that falls half a kilometre to the shores of Corrie Lochan.

Càrn Eighe lies in the north-west highlands, north of the Great Glen Fault. Discontinuous sheets of West Highland granite gneiss stretch up from this fault through Glen Affric.

=== Summit panorama ===
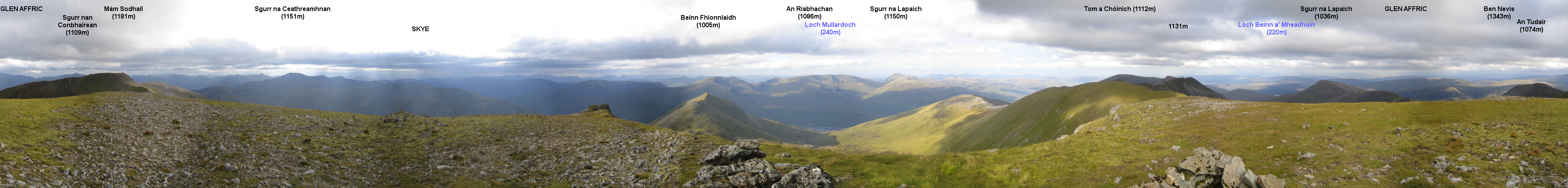

== History ==
In 1848, the mountain was climbed by Colonel Winzer of the Ordnance Survey, who discovered a pile of stones and deduced that it had been climbed earlier, although a local gamekeeper suggested it was a shelter (bothy) for watchers. In 1891 Sir Hugh Munro, 4th Baronet listed Càrn Eighe in his Munro Tables, in which it has remained. The full set of Munros has been "completed" at least 6,000 times since then.

== Flora and fauna ==
Typical of the Scottish Highlands, the slopes of the mountain are largely treeless, especially at higher elevations. The mountain is instead clad in a variety of grasses and mosses, which towards the summit are covered by snow during parts of the year. The lower slopes are described by Muir as "boggy, sodden moorland". The base of the southern side of the mountain, adjacent to Loch Affric, is wooded with Scots pine interspersed with other species such as oak, birch, and beech. These woods are inhabited by a number of endemic fauna, including the crested tit and the Scottish crossbill.

== Location ==
Situated in the north of Scotland, Càrn Eighe is on the border of two historic counties, Inverness and Ross and Cromarty, and is the highest point of the latter. The mountain is fairly remote, more than ten kilometres (6 mi) from the nearest road, in Glen Affric, although there is a youth hostel (Alltbeithe) in the same valley that is nearer. The summit is at UK grid reference NH123261, which falls on the OS Landranger 25 map, the OS Explorer series 414–5, and the much larger area map 9.

== Climbing ==
The mountain can be climbed from the south, beginning at Loch Affric, up the north side of Gleann nam Fiadh (fording a stream) and reaching the summit of both Càrn Eighe itself and then Mam Sodhail in either clockwise or anticlockwise fashion (route described anticlockwise), potentially including Beinn Fhionnlaidh as an extra, since this is relatively difficult to access in any other way. The summit is marked by an Ordnance Survey triangulation pillar (trig point) and a cairn. Including only the three principal Munros (i.e. excluding the two summits to the east), a successful ascent of this mountain might take between 9 and 10 hours. There is also a route to the summit from the north, via Beinn Fhionnlaidh, starting from a boat-accessible spot on Loch Mullardoch.

== See also ==
- List of Munro mountains
- Mountains and hills of Scotland
