= Beinn Fhionnlaidh (Mullardoch) =

Mountain in the Highlands of Scotland

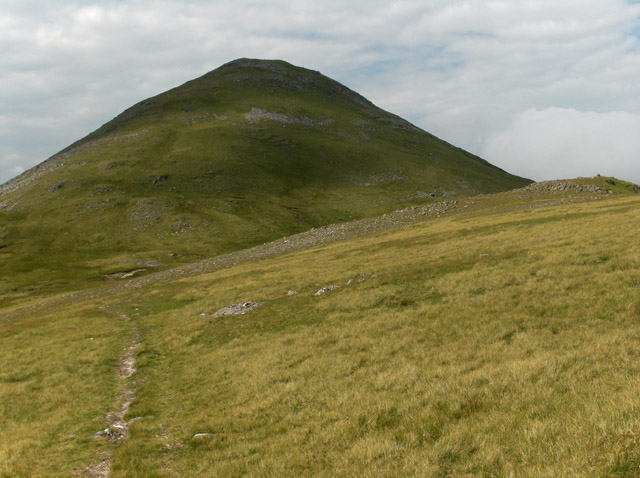
- Bealach Beag and Beinn Fhionnlaidh, July 2006

Highest point
- Elevation: 1,005 m (3,297 ft)
- Prominence: 173 m (568 ft)
- Parent peak: Càrn Eige
- Listing: Munro, Marilyn
- Coordinates: 57°18′21″N 5°07′48″W

Naming
- English translation: Finlay's mountain
- Language of name: Gaelic

Geography
- Location within Highland Location within the United Kingdom
- Location: Highland, Scotland
- OS grid: NH115282
- Topo map: OS Landranger 25, OS Explorer 414

Beinn Fhionnlaidh is a mountain in the Highlands of Scotland. It is situated on the south side of Loch Mullardoch, at the end of Glen Cannich, about 60 km west of Inverness.

== Ascent ==
Beinn Fhionnlaidh is a very inaccessible mountain, some distance from the nearest road, so usually involves a long walk in. One route is to start from the end of Loch Beinn a' Mheadhoin in Glen Affric, then follow a path up Gleann nam Fiadh. From there, it is necessary to climb up and over the east ridge of Càrn Eige, before following its north ridge to Beinn Fhionnlaidh, via Bealach Beag.

Another approach is from the west, starting from the end of the road at Killilan. From there follow a track along Glen Elchaig to Iron Lodge, then a path to the western end of Loch Mullardoch, at the foot of Beinn Fhionnlaidh.

An easier alternative is to travel by boat along Loch Mullardoch to the foot of Beinn Fhionnlaidh, then climb straight up.
