= Affric-Beauly hydro-electric power scheme =

Power stations on River Affric and River Beauly in Scottish Highlands

Affric-Beauly Hydro-Electric Scheme
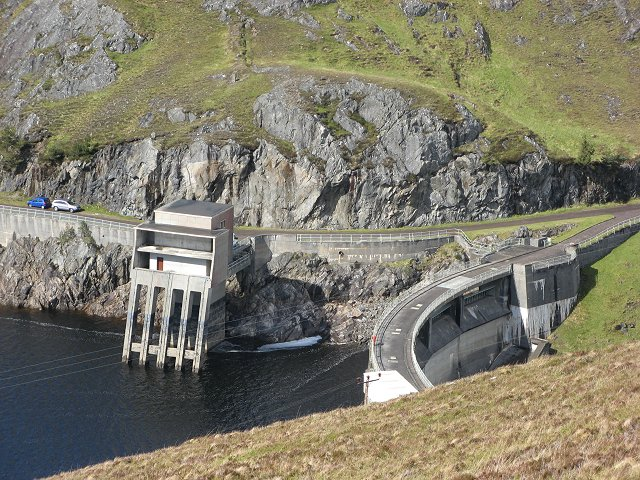
- Monar dam and intake

- Location within Highland
- Interactive map of Affric-Beauly; Hydro-Electric Scheme
- Country: Scotland
- Location: Glen Affric
- Coordinates: 57.325°N 4.794°W
- Purpose: Power
- Status: Operational
- Opening date: 1951
- Owner: SSE

The Affric-Beauly hydro-electric power scheme for the generation of hydro-electric power is located in the western Highlands of Scotland. It is based around Glen Strathfarrar, Glen Cannich and Glen Affric, and Strathglass further downstream.

== History ==
There had been attempts to build a hydro-electric scheme in Glen Affric in 1929 and in 1941. Both had been promoted by the Grampian Electricity Company, but both had been defeated when the authorising bills were deposited before parliament.

The North of Scotland Hydro-Electric Board was created by the Hydro-electric Development (Scotland) Act 1943, a measure championed by the politician Tom Johnston while he was Secretary of State for Scotland. Johnston's vision was for a public body that could build hydro-electric stations throughout the Highlands. Profits made by selling bulk electricity to the Scottish lowlands would be used to fund "the economic development and social improvement of the North of Scotland." Private consumers would be offered a supply of cheap electricity, and their connection to that supply would not reflect the actual cost of its provision in remote and sparsely populated areas.

The first two major schemes promoted by the Board had been at Loch Sloy and Tummel-Garry, but both had been the subject of fierce opposition on the grounds of amenity and fishing. In order to avoid a repetition of such opposition, the Board devised a scheme which would not fulfill the full potential of Glen Affric, but which would be more likely to obtain approval. In this they were assisted by Sir William Halcrow and Partners, covering the civil engineering aspects of the scheme, Kennedy and Donkin, covering the electrical and mechanical aspects, and James Shearer, one of three architects who advised the Board. They hoped that the scheme proposed would preserve the scenic beauty of the Glen, and would help to prevent severe flooding in the glen and in Strathglass.

The earlier schemes had envisaged raising the level of Loch Beinn a' Mheadhoinn (Loch Benevean) sufficiently that Loch Affric would have become part of one huge body of water. The new scheme would only raise the level of the loch by 23 feet (7.0 m), which ensured that Loch Affric remained distinct, and Affric Lodge was unaffected. Instead, the level of the more remote Loch Mullardoch would be raised by 113 feet (34 m), to cope with fluctuations in the volume of water stored. The scheme became the Board's Constructional Scheme No.7, when plans for it were published in August 1946. Surprisingly, there were no objections at all on the grounds of amenity or fishing, and only one minor technical objection which was resolved by negotiation. Accordingly, the scheme was approved by Parliament in February 1947.

=== Construction ===
Some preparatory work was required before work on the main scheme could begin. Two camps to house the workers were required, one at Cannich and the other at Cozac, near Mullardoch. They provided accommodation for 2,100 men, as well as offices and workshops. A number of roads and four new bridges were built, to improve access to the sites, while the road beside the River Affric and Loch Beinn a' Mheadhoin was rebuilt at a higher level, to avoid it being flooded as the level of the loch was raised.

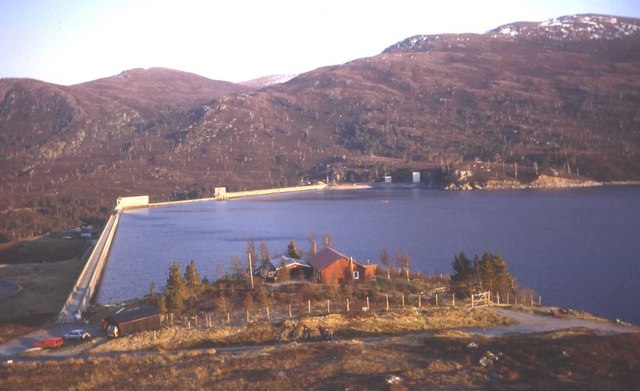
Mullardoch Dam

The largest dam of the scheme is at Loch Mullardoch, at the head of Glen Cannich. At 2,385 feet (727 m) long and 160 feet (49 m) high from the bottom of the foundations to the crest, it proved to be the largest dam constructed by the Board. 286,000 cubic yards (219,000 m^{3}) of concrete were used in its structure, and it holds back 7.5 million cubic feet (210 Ml) of water. The work was carried out by John Cochrane and Sons, and the dam was built in two halves, using an island in the middle of the loch to reduce the volume of material required. The dam is a mass gravity dam, and by late 1949 the north wing was nearing completion, when a financial crisis meant that the government asked the Board to reduce capital expenditure. After considering various options, they decided to reduce the height of the south wing by 20 feet (6.1 m).

Construction of the smaller structure began in March 1950, but in February 1951 the financial crisis eased, and plans to build the south wing to its original height were drawn up. Putting a new slab of concrete over an older structure carries structural risks, and so a technique which had been used on the Mundaring Weir in Australia was used. The downstream face of the dam was covered with a concrete blanket 11.5 feet (3.5 m) thick, which was separated from the original dam by a slot, to allow the new concrete to set without overheating the original dam. Once adequate setting had occurred, the new concrete was bonded to the old by filling the slot with crushed aggregate and grout, and this process was finished in mid 1952.

From the dam, a tunnel takes water to Loch Beinn a' Mheadhoin in Glen Affric, via a small underground power station near Mullardoch dam. Loch Beinn a' Mheadhoin is also dammed, with a tunnel taking water to the main power station of Fasnakyle, near Cannich. Tunnelling began in 1948, and the tunnel to Fasnakyle was completed by October 1949, while that from Loch Mullardoch was finished in late 1950. John Cochrane and Sons were the contractors for both tunnels, and much of the process was mechanised, due to a shortage of labour.

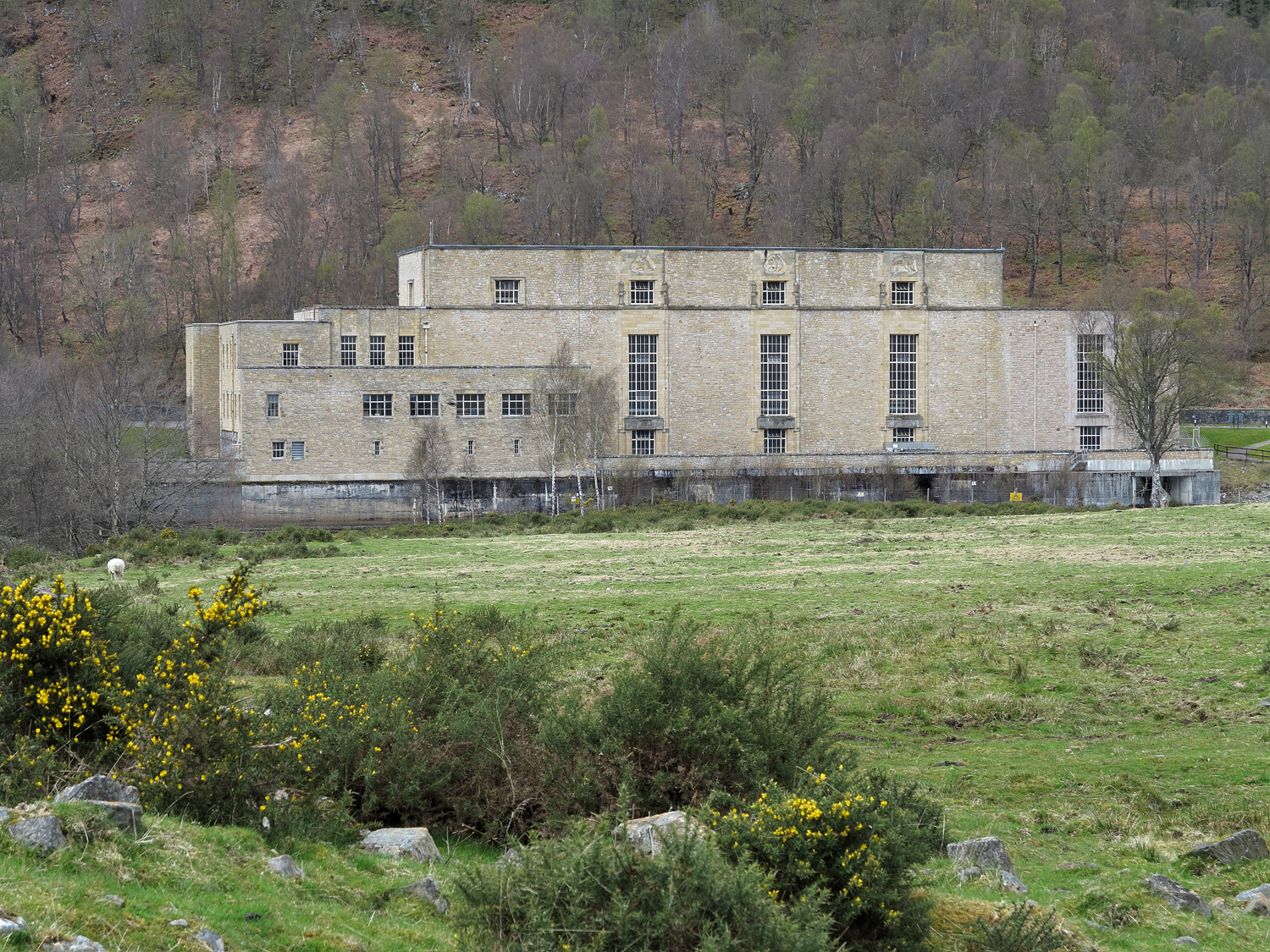
Fasnakyle power station

The Mullardoch tunnel is some 17,100 feet (5,200 m) long, and falls by just 3 feet (0.9 m) over its entire length. The Fasnakyle tunnel is more complex, consisting of 12,340 feet (3,760 m) of low pressure tunnel which ends at a surge shaft near a hill called Creag Liath. The tunnel passes under three streams, the Allt Blar na Gamhna, the An Cam-Allt and the Allt Innis an Droighinn, on which intakes were constructed to divert some of their flow into the tunnel. From the surge shaft, a high pressure shaft descends 340 feet (100 m), and from the bottom of the shaft, 5,025 feet (1,532 m) of high pressure tunnel descend to the power station. In the final section, the tunnel splits into three tunnels, which are lined with steel, and each feeds a 22 MW vertical Francis turbo-alternator. The need to preserve the amenity of Glen Affric and an acute shortage of steel meant that this approach was preferable to final steel pipelines laid on the surface, and it was the first time that this solution had been used in Britain.

The opening ceremony for this first stage took place on 13 October 1952. Prince Philip accepted an invitation to open the scheme because he wanted to see whether criticism of the Board for wantonly destroying the beauty of the Highlands was justified. He stated on the occasion:

"I am entirely relieved of all anxiety on that score. To suggest that this power house [Fasnakyle] alone destroys the beauty of Glen Affric is being as fastidious as the fairy-tale princess who could feel a pea under 15 matresses."

One extra benefit of the scheme was that large tracts of arable and pasture land beside the River Beauly between Cannich and Aigas were no longer subject to regular flooding. They were thus able to be brought back into active cultivation.

=== Second phase ===
The second phase of the Affric-Beauly scheme was the Board's Constructional Scheme No.30, Strathfarrar and Kilmorack. Unlike the first stage, there were serious objections to this phase from riparian landowners. Negotiations to resolve these issues took a long time, and a private settlement of £100,000 was made to Lord Lovat in respect of damage to fishing rights and spawning grounds. Despite all this, there were still calls for a public enquiry, which was held in December 1957. The Commissioner recommended that the scheme should proceed, and the Secretary of State for Scotland confirmed this in May 1958. An attempt to get the scheme annulled by Gerald Nabarro failed to attract Parliamentary support, and the scheme was finally authorised in July 1958.

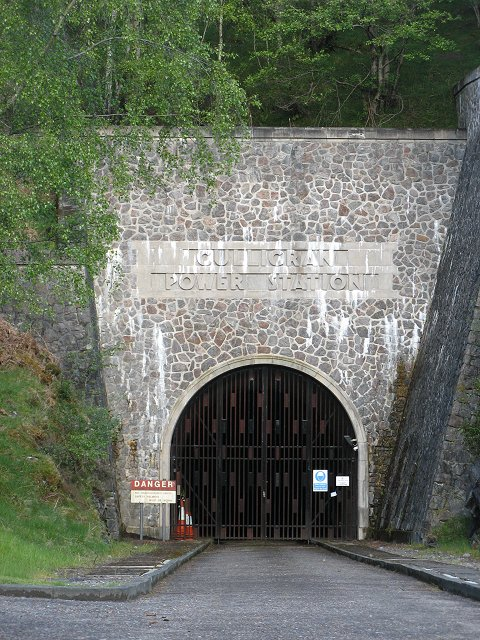
Entrance to Culligran power station

To the north in Glen Strathfarrar, Loch Monar is dammed, and a 5.6-mile (9 km) tunnel carries water to an underground power station at Deanie. The dam is the only example of a double-arched dam to be constructed in Britain. Single-arched dams, which curve in the horizontal plane, had been in use since 1911, but the double-arched dam, which also curves in the vertical plane, was relatively untried, although a number of dams of this design were built in the United States from the late 1960s onwards. The design was possible in this location because it was located in a gorge, the sides of which provided the necessary strength to resist the thrust of the arch. The estimated cost was around nine percent lower than for a mass gravity dam, and the dam wall is only 11.5 feet (3.5 m) thick in places. Construction proved more difficult than expected, due to an undetected fault in what was thought to be solid rock. The Board were always keen to assist engineers and manufacturers in trying out new designs, and this may have been part of the rationale for using a double arched dam. A large number of strain gauges, resistance thermometers and other instrumentation were built into the dam, to provide scientific data on the stresses within such a structure. A second arm of Loch Monar was closed by the Loichel dam, which was a mass gravity dam. It is 680 feet (210 m) long and rose 65 feet (20 m) above its foundations. An aqueduct intercepts several streams to the south of the dam, providing additional water which would otherwise discharge into the River Farrar.

Similar undetected faults were discovered when excavating the underground chamber for Deanie power station. The tunnel from Loch Monar terminates in a surge shaft just behind the power station, which is accessed through a road tunnel, to allow vehicles to reach the station. The tunnel entrance has a stone portal, probably built of stone excavated when building the main chamber. Two Francis turbines produce 38 MW of power, and the water is discharged into the adjacent Loch Beannacharan. An aqueduct intercepts streams to the north of Loch Beannacharan, and additional water is discharged into the main Deanie pipeline.

Further down the glen, the River Farrar is dammed just below Loch Beannacharan, with a tunnel to take water to Culligran power station, which is also built underground. The station has a 24 MW Deriaz turbine, the first of its type to be installed in Britain, which was another example of assisting engineers and manufacturers to try out new designs. Compensation water released from Beannacharan dam can be passed through the Culligran compensation set, a 2 MW turbine which was commissioned with the main power station in 1962.

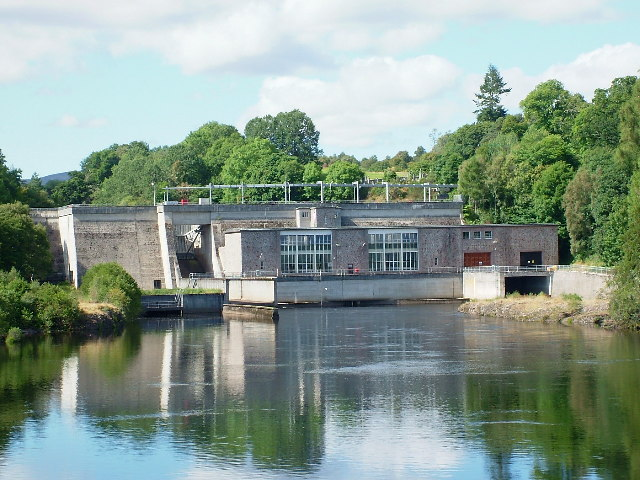
Kilmorack power station, looking upstream

The River Farrar joins with the River Glass near Struy to form the River Beauly. Flow on the River Glass has been supplemented by water from the River Affric and the Cannich at this point. It is 6 miles (9.7 km) from Culligran power station to Aigas, and the river only falls by 29 feet (8.8 m) over this distance. On the River Beauly, two dams and power stations have been built in gorges at Aigas and Kilmorack. Both are of the mass gravity type. Aigas dam is 300 feet (91 m) long and 90 feet (27 m) high, while Kilmorach is a little larger, at 380 feet (120 m) long and 96 feet (29 m) high. Both stations are fitted with twin 10 MW vertical Kaplan turbines, and are run-of-the-river stations, rather than storing water behind the dams.

=== Operation ===
As the rivers in this scheme are important for Atlantic salmon, flow in the rivers is kept above agreed levels by releasing compensation water through the dams. Those at Bennachran, Aigas and Kilmorack are quite complex, compared to the other dams on the system. They are fitted with Borland fish lifts to allow salmon to pass, which are similar to navigation locks in their operation. The three dams include features for flood control, and compensation water can be released either through a turbine to generate power, or through a valve that bypasses the turbine when no power is required. The power stations at Aigas and Kilmorack are built into the structure of the dam.

The Borland fish lifts take around an hour to fill, and are operated at least twice a day from April to November at Aigas and Kilmorack, while the Beannacharan lift if operated at least three times a day from May to November. In addition to compensation flows, SSE maintain a schedule of freshet releases, regulated by the Scottish Environment Protection Agency, where additional water is released from Beannacharan dam into the River Farrar to simulate high-flow events which might occur naturally if the river was not impounded. An extra 910 Ml of water is released over a 56-hour period, once a week for 15 weeks from early July, to assist fish migration.

In 1945, the newly elected Labour government had drawn up plans for the nationalisation of the electricity industry. Emmanuel Shinwell, the minister for Fuel and Power, was in charge of the scheme, which the North of Scotland Hydro-Electric Board feared would result in them losing control of power generation, and only being responsible for distribution. This would have made the aims of the 1943 Act, to promote economic regeneration of the Highlands, difficult to achieve. Shinwell met Tom Johnston at Pitlochry, and the two men wandered away from their advisors to have a private conversation, near the site of the future Loch Faskally. On their return, Shinwell announced "I've decided the Board will retain its autonomy", and thus the Board remained responsible for generation and distribution until the electricity industry was privatised.

Following the passing of the Electricity Act 1989, a private company called Scottish Hydro Electric was formed to take over the assets and responsibilities of the North of Scotland Hydro-Electric Board, including the Affric-Beauly scheme. The company was floated on the stock market in 1991. Unlike the English and Welsh privatisation, Scottish Hydro Electric was fully integrated, remaining responsible both for power generation and for its distribution to customers. In 1998, the company merged with Southern Electric to become Scottish and Southern Energy, since rebranded as SSE plc.

Fasnakyle power station was upgraded in 2003, when a new building was constructed next to the turbine hall to house a fourth turbine, rated at 17 MW. Apart from the lack of an attic, the new building blends in well with the original, and is built of similar stone. Since 1986, the station has been a Category A listed building, in recognition that it is an outstanding example of a large power station constructed by James Shearer, and a preeminent example of his ideals. In 2006, the Fasnakyle compensation set was added to the system. This is an 8 MW turbine through which compensation water released from Loch Beinn a' Mheadhoin to maintain the flow in the River Affric can pass. Mullardoch dam, with its unusual arrowhead plan, was listed in 2011.

== Power stations ==
Name	Year commissioned	Gross head (metres)	Installed capacity (megawatts)	Average annual output (million KWh)	OS grid reference
Fasnakyle	1951	159	69	254	NH319296
Mullardoch	1955	27	2.4	8	NH223309
Culligran	1962	60	19	59	NH378405
Aigas	1962	18	20	60	NH474436
Kilmorack	1962	17	20	58	NH494442
Deanie	1963	113	38	92	NH292388

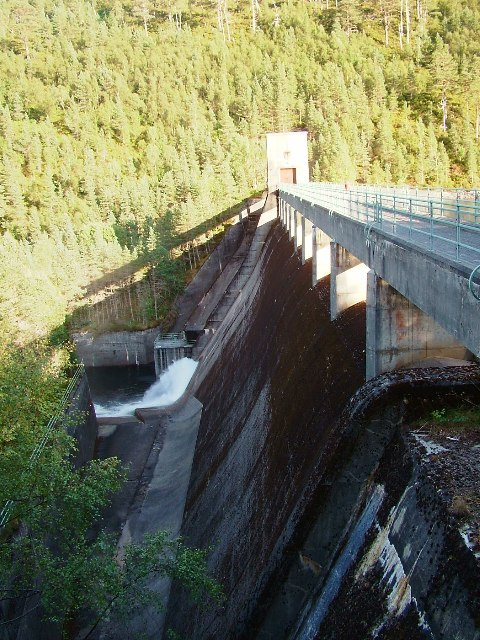
Benevean Dam

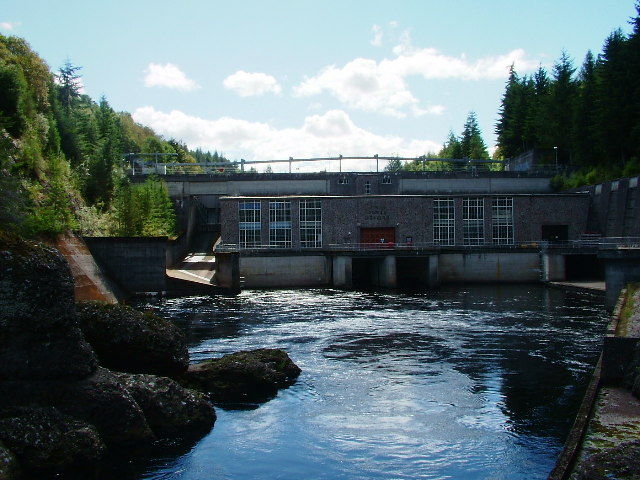
Aigas power station

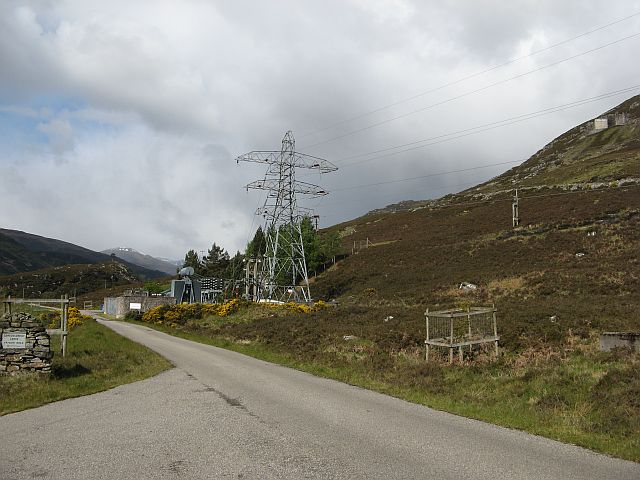
Deanie Power Station

== Bibliography ==
- "Power From the Glens" (PDF). Scottish and Southern Energy. Archived from the original (PDF) on 18 October 2007.
- BERR, ed. (2009). "Power stations in the United Kingdom, May 2009 (DUKES 5.11)". BERR. Archived from the original (XLS) on 2 October 2009.
- Fleetwood, David; et al. (2010). MacDowell, Dawn (ed.). Power to the People - the built heritage of Scotland's hydroelectric power. Historic Scotland. ISBN 978-1-84917-036-9.
- Miller, James (2002). The dam builders: power from the glens. Birlinn. ISBN 978-1-84158-225-2.
- Payne, Peter L (1988). The hydro: a study of the development of the major hydro-electric schemes undertaken by the North of Scotland Hydro-Electric Board. Pergamon. ISBN 978-0-08-036584-8.
- Reeves, Julian, ed. (2018). Power from the Glens - 75th Anniversary edition. SSE. ISBN 978-1-5272-2500-8.
- Wood, Emma (2002). The Hydro Boys: Pioneers of Renewable Energy. Luath Press. ISBN 978-1-84282-016-2.

Media related to Affric-Beauly hydro-electric scheme at Wikimedia Commons
