= Beinn Fhionnlaidh =

Beinn Fhionnlaidh is the name of two mountains in Scotland, both listed as Munros:

- Beinn Fhionnlaidh (Creran), 959 m, between Glen Creran and Glen Etive, in Argyll
- Beinn Fhionnlaidh (Mullardoch), 1005 m, on the south side of Loch Mullardoch, between Glen Cannich and Glen Affric
