= Sgùrr nan Ceathramhnan =

Mountain in the Northwest Highlands of Scotland

Coordinates: 57°15′18″N 5°13′25″W

Sgùrr nan Ceathreamhnan
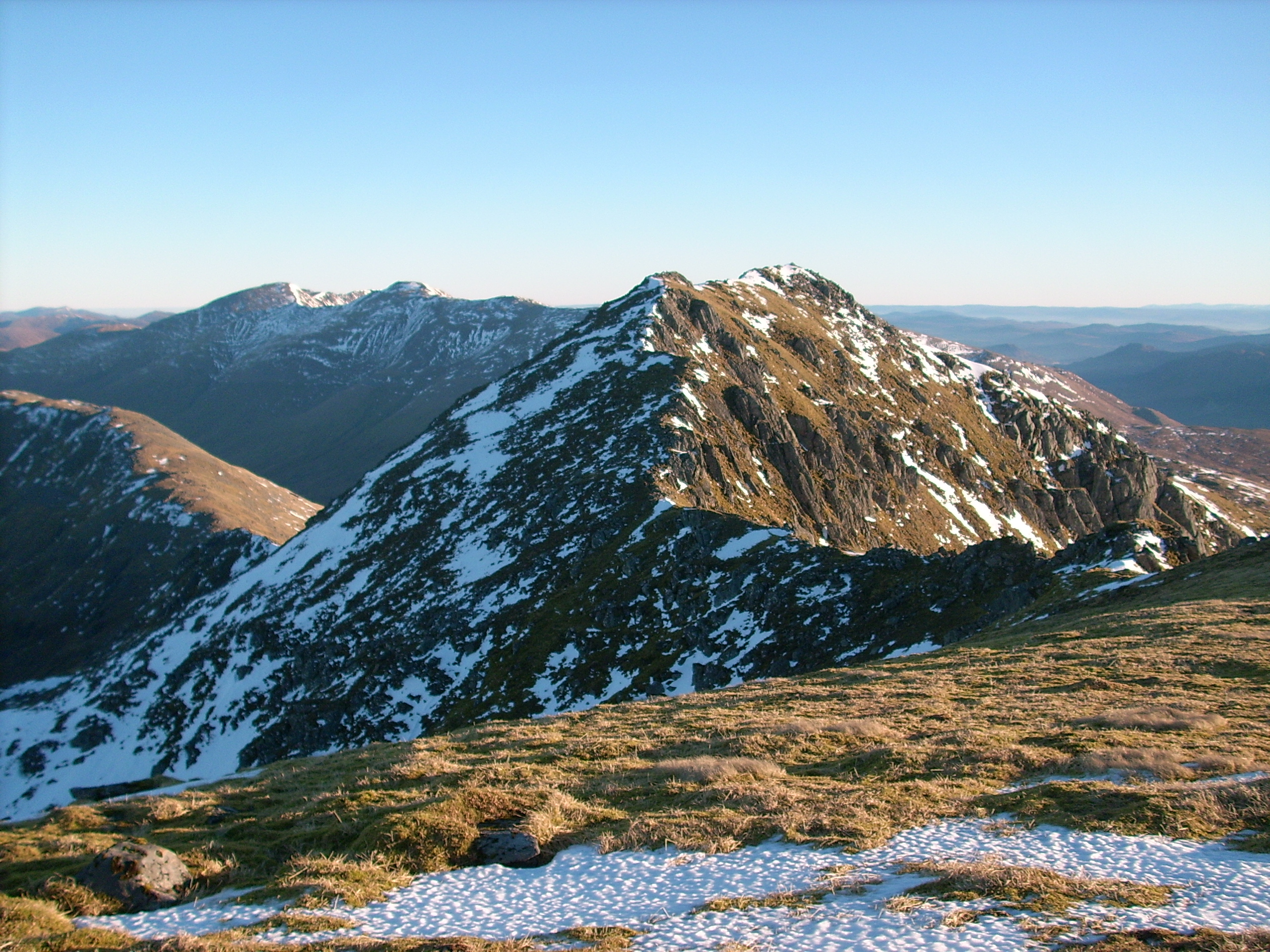
- Sgùrr nan Ceathreamhnan summit from the west

Highest point
- Elevation: 1,151 m (3,776 ft)
- Prominence: c. 435 m
- Listing: Munro, Marilyn

Naming
- English translation: peak of the quarters
- Language of name: Scottish Gaelic
- Pronunciation: Scottish Gaelic: [ˈs̪kuːrˠ nəŋʲ ˈkʰʲɛɾəvən]

Geography
- Location: Glen Affric, Scotland
- Parent range: Northwest Highlands
- OS grid: NH056228
- Topo map: OS Landranger 25, 33

Listed summits of Sgùrr nan Ceathramhnan
| Name | Grid ref | Height | Status |
|---|---|---|---|
| Western Top | NH052228 | 1143 m (3750 ft) | Munro Top |
| Stùc Bheag | NH053237 | 1075 m (3527 ft) | Munro Top |
| Stùc Mòr | NH053242 | 1041 m (3415 ft) | Munro Top |
| Stob Fraoch Choire | NH052253 | 918 m (3012 ft) | Munro Top |
| Stob Coire na Cloiche | NH075227 | 915 m (3002 ft) | Deleted Munro Top |

Sgùrr nan Ceathreamhnan (Scottish Gaelic for 'peak of the quarters') is a mountain in the Northwest Highlands of Scotland. It lies between Glen Affric and Glen Elchaig, some 30 kilometres east of Kyle of Lochalsh. With a height of 1,151 metres (3,776 ft) it is classed as a Munro and ranked as the third highest mountain north of the Great Glen (after Carn Eighe and Mam Sodhail).

== Geography ==
E.J. Yeaman in his Handbook of the Scottish Hills deems Ceathreamhnan the fourth-most difficult Scottish Munro to climb, taking into account its remoteness and its height. It is a massive mountain which covers 24 square miles (62 square km) and stands many kilometres from the nearest public road, it has a tent like appearance and throws down many long ridges to the valleys. It has five subsidiary “tops”, three of these stand on the northern ridge, they are Stuc Bheag (1075 metres), Stuc Mòr (1041 metres) and Stob Fraoch Choire (918 metres). The Western Top (1143 metres) is also regarded as a "top". Stob Coire na Cloiche (915 metres) on the eastern ridge was removed as a Munro Top. In addition to this Sgùrr nan Ceathreamhnan has three tops which have been deleted from the list over the years, making a total of eight distinct summits on the mountain in addition to the highest point. Its outlier to the north east, Mullach na Dheiragain, is regarded as a separate Munro.

The Gaelic name means "peak of the quarters", referring to the large amount of land it divides with its ridges. Sgùrr nan Ceathreamhnan's summit has twin peaks linked by a curving ridge with the western pinnacle lying 500 metres away from the highest point and reaching 1143 metres in height. There is a small amount of scrambling involved in traversing between the two summits.

== Ascents ==
The ascent of Sgùrr nan Ceathreamhnan is a major undertaking best done during the long hours of summer daylight. The shortest approach is from the Alltbeithe youth hostel in upper Glen Affric at grid reference NH079202 3.5 kilometres south of the summit; however, it is a major undertaking just to get to the hostel, with long walks in from Loch Cluanie to the south or from the road end in Glen Affric. It is also possible to start walking from Iron Lodge in Glen Elchaig but a bicycle is needed to travel up the estate road, another approach starts from the car park in Strath Croe. From the Alltbeithe hostel the ascent goes north up a stalkers path to the col between Sgùrr nan Ceathreamhnan and An Socach - the latter a minor Munro which can be easily "bagged" on the way to Ceathreamhnan's summit with little extra effort. The view from the summit is one of remote mountainous country, although with the help of binoculars it is possible to see Inverness and the Kessock Bridge, over 70 kilometres away to the east.

== See also ==
- List of Munro mountains
- Mountains and hills of Scotland
