= Water turbine =

Type of turbine

Kaplan turbine and electrical generator cut-away view.

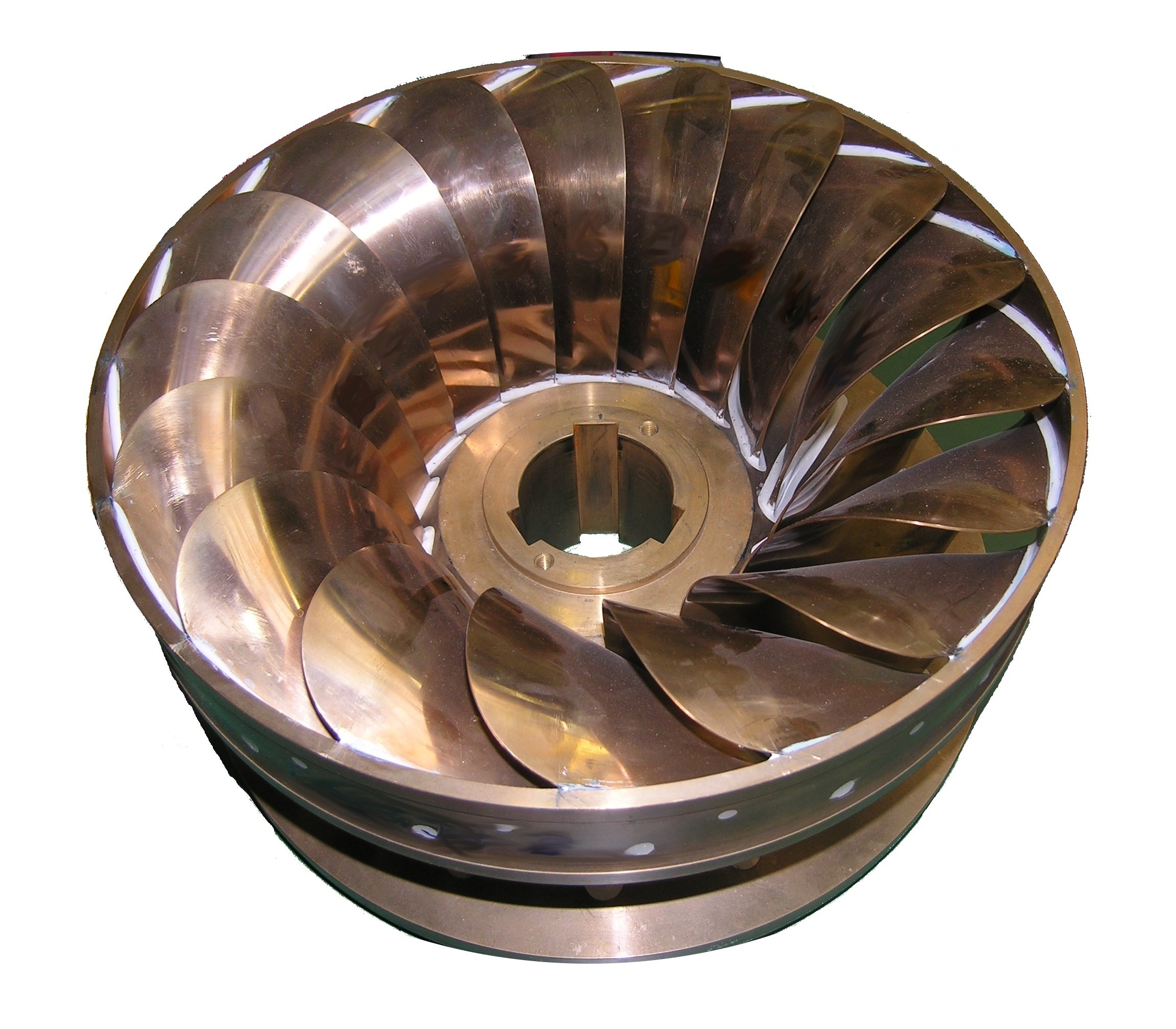
The runner of the small water turbine

A water turbine is a rotary machine that converts kinetic energy and potential energy of water into mechanical work.

Water turbines were developed in the 19th century and were widely used for industrial power prior to electrical grids. Since then, they have been mostly used for electric power generation. Water turbines are mostly found in dams to generate electric power from water potential energy.

== History ==
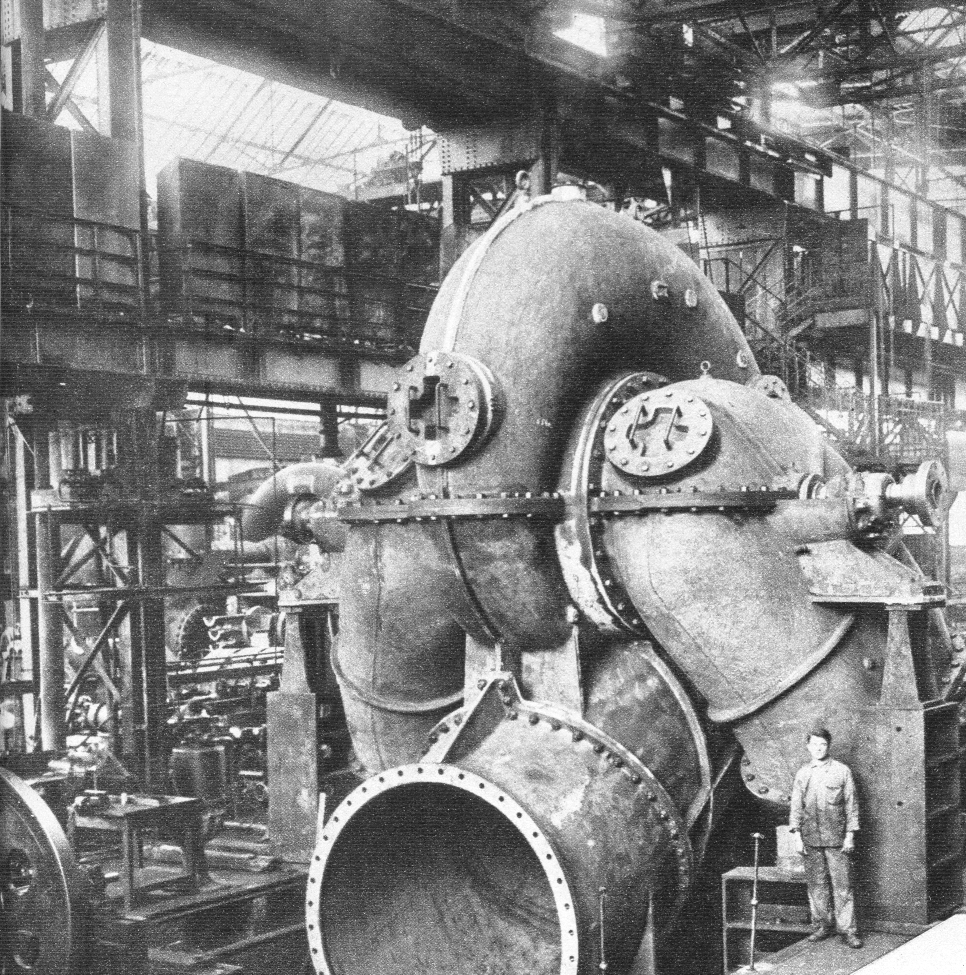
The construction of a Ganz water Turbo Generator in Budapest in 1886

Water wheels have been used for hundreds of years for industrial power. Their main shortcoming is size, which limits the flow rate and head that can be harnessed. The migration from water wheels to modern turbines took about one hundred years. Development occurred during the Industrial Revolution, using scientific principles and methods. They also made extensive use of new materials and manufacturing methods developed at the time.

=== Swirl ===
The word turbine was introduced by the French engineer Claude Burdin in the early 19th century and is derived from the Greek word "τύρβη" for "whirling" or a "vortex". The main difference between early water turbines and water wheels is a swirl component of the water which passes energy to a spinning rotor. This additional component of motion allowed the turbine to be smaller than a water wheel of the same power. They could process more water by spinning faster and could harness much greater heads. (Later, impulse turbines were developed which didn't use swirl.)

=== Timeline ===
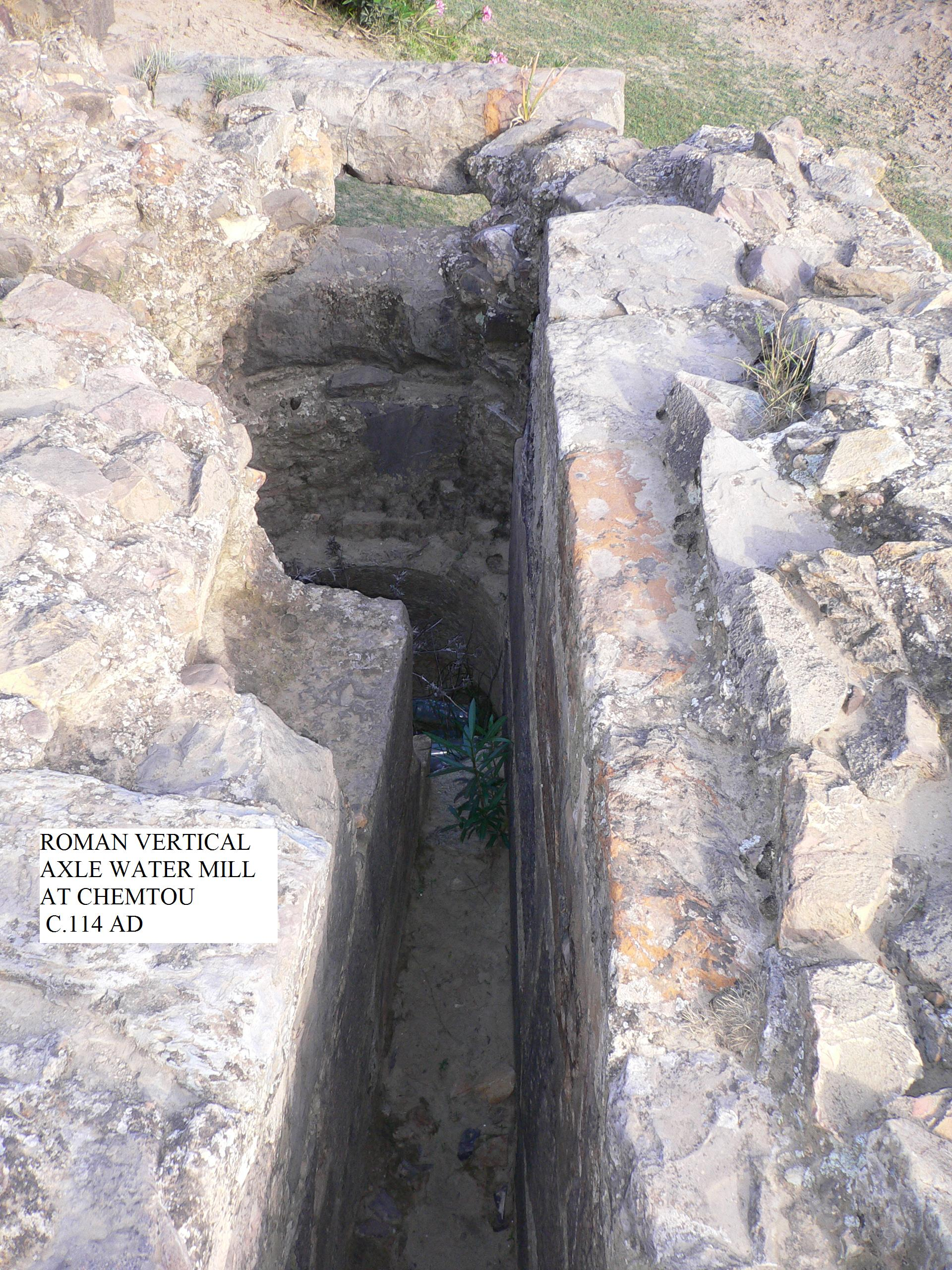
Roman turbine mill at Chemtou, Tunisia. The tangential water inflow of the mill race made the submerged horizontal wheel in the shaft turn like a true turbine.

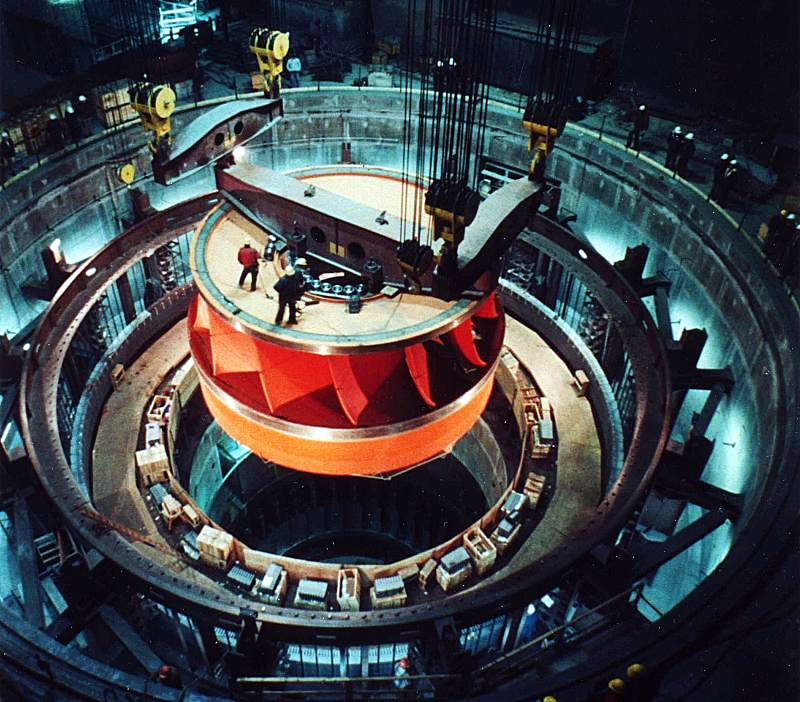
A Francis turbine runner, rated at nearly one million hp (750 MW), being installed at the Grand Coulee Dam, United States.

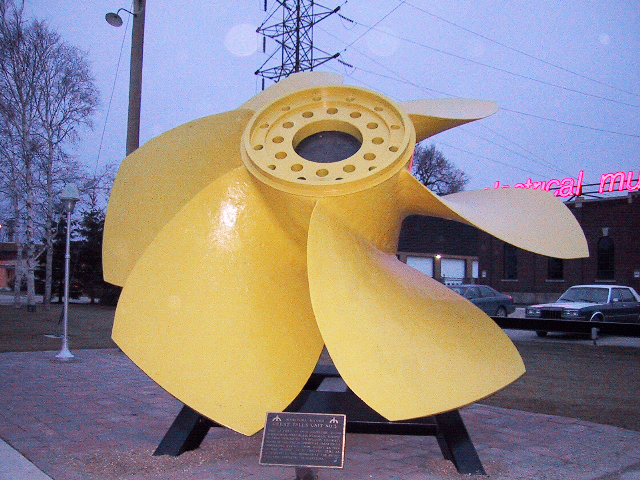
A propeller-type runner rated 28,000 hp (21 MW)

The earliest known water turbines date to the Roman Empire. Two helix-turbine mill sites of almost identical design were found at Chemtou and Testour, modern-day Tunisia, dating to the late 3rd or early 4th century AD. The horizontal water wheel with angled blades was installed at the bottom of a water-filled, circular shaft. The water from the mill race entered the pit tangentially, creating a swirling water column which made the fully submerged wheel act like a true turbine.

Fausto Veranzio in his book Machinae Novae (1595) described a vertical axis mill with a rotor similar to that of a Francis turbine.

Johann Segner developed a reactive water turbine (Segner wheel) in the mid-18th century in Kingdom of Hungary. It had a horizontal axis and was a precursor to modern water turbines. It is a very simple machine that is still produced for use in small hydro sites. Segner worked with Euler on some of the early mathematical theories of turbine design. In the 18th century, a Dr. Robert Barker invented a similar reaction hydraulic turbine that became popular as a lecture-hall demonstration. The only known surviving example of this type of engine used in power production, dating from 1851, is found at Hacienda Buena Vista in Ponce, Puerto Rico.

In 1820, Jean-Victor Poncelet developed an inward-flow turbine.

In 1826, Benoît Fourneyron developed an outward-flow turbine. This was an efficient machine (~80%) that sent water through a runner with blades curved in one dimension. The stationary outlet also had curved guides.

In 1844, Uriah A. Boyden developed an outward-flow turbine that improved on the performance of the Fourneyron turbine. Its runner shape was similar to that of a Francis turbine.

In 1849, James B. Francis improved the inward-flow reaction turbine to over 90% efficiency. He also conducted sophisticated tests and developed engineering methods for water turbine design. The Francis turbine, named for him, is the first modern water turbine. It is still the most widely used water turbine in the world. The Francis turbine is also called a radial flow turbine, since water flows from the outer circumference toward the centre of the runner.

Inward-flow water turbines have a better mechanical arrangement and all modern reaction water turbines use this design. As the water swirls inward, it accelerates and transfers energy to the runner. Water pressure decreases to atmospheric, or in some cases subatmospheric, as the water passes through the turbine blades and loses energy.

In 1876, John B. McCormick, building on Francis's designs, demonstrated the first modern mixed-flow turbine with the development of the Hercules turbine, initially manufactured by the Holyoke Machine Company and subsequently improved upon by engineers in Germany and the United States. The design effectively combined the inward flow principles of the Francis design with the downward discharge of the Jonval turbine, with flow inward at the inlet, axial through the wheel's body, and slightly outward at the outlet. Initially performing optimally at 90% efficiency at lower speeds, this design would see many improvements in the subsequent decades in derivatives under names like "Victor", "Risdon", "Samson", and "New American", ushering in a new era of American turbine engineering.

Water turbines, particularly in the Americas, would largely become standardized with the establishment of the Holyoke Testing Flume, described as the first modern hydraulic laboratory in the United States by Robert E. Horton and Clemens Herschel, the latter of which would serve as its chief engineer for a time. Initially created in 1872 by James B. Emerson from the testing flumes of Lowell, after 1880 the Holyoke, Massachusetts hydraulic laboratory was standardized by Herschel, who used it to develop the Venturi meter, the first accurate means of measuring large flows, to properly measure water power efficiency by different turbine models. While skepticism of certain weir calculations were held by European hydrologists, the facility allowed for standard efficiency testing among major manufacturers through 1932, by which time more modern facilities and methods had proliferated.

Around 1890, the modern fluid bearing was invented, and since then has become universally used to support heavy water turbine spindles. As of 2002, fluid bearings appear to have a mean time between failures of more than 1300 years.

Around 1913, Viktor Kaplan created the Kaplan turbine, a propeller-type machine. It was an evolution of the Francis turbine and revolutionized the ability to develop low-head hydro sites.

=== New concept ===
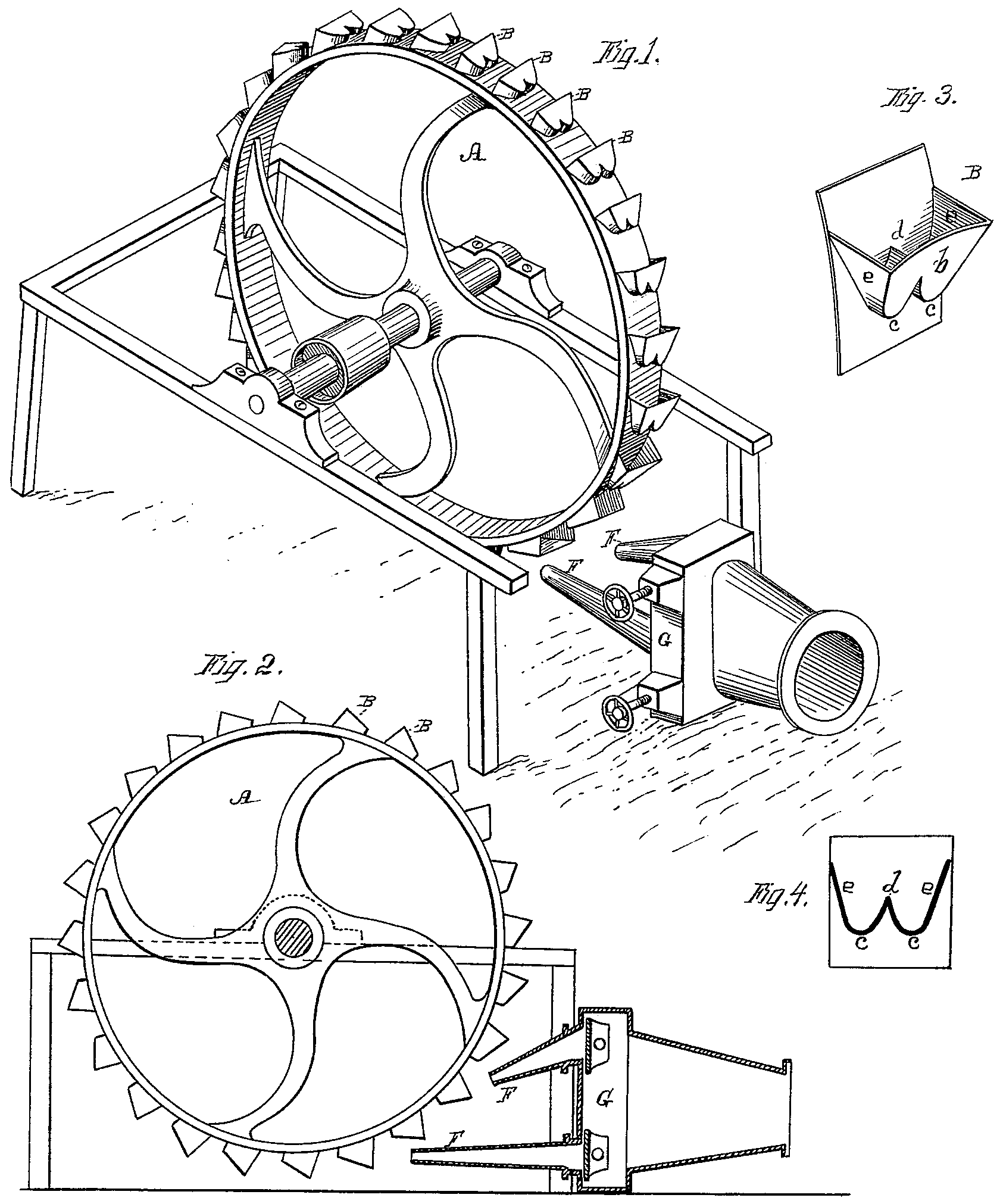
Figure from Pelton's original patent (October 1880)

All common water machines until the late 19th century (including water wheels) were basically reaction machines; water pressure head acted on the machine and produced work. A reaction turbine needs to fully contain the water during energy transfer.

In 1866, California millwright Samuel Knight invented a machine that took the impulse system to a new level. Inspired by the high pressure jet systems used in hydraulic mining in the gold fields, Knight developed a bucketed wheel which captured the energy of a free jet, which had converted a high head (hundreds of vertical feet in a pipe or penstock) of water to kinetic energy. This is called an impulse or tangential turbine. The water's velocity, roughly twice the velocity of the bucket periphery, does a U-turn in the bucket and drops out of the runner at low velocity.

In 1879, Lester Pelton, experimenting with a Knight Wheel, developed a Pelton wheel (double bucket design), which exhausted the water to the side, eliminating some energy loss of the Knight wheel which exhausted some water back against the center of the wheel. In about 1895, William Doble improved on Pelton's half-cylindrical bucket form with an elliptical bucket that included a cut in it to allow the jet a cleaner bucket entry. This is the modern form of the Pelton turbine which achieves up to 92% efficiency. Pelton had been quite an effective promoter of his design and although Doble took over the Pelton company he did not change the name to Doble because it had brand name recognition.

Turgo and cross-flow turbines were later impulse designs.

== Theory of operation ==
Flowing water is directed on to the blades of a turbine runner, creating a force on the blades. Since the runner is spinning, the force acts through a distance (force acting through a distance is the definition of work). In this way, energy is transferred from the water flow to the turbine.

Water turbines are divided into two groups: reaction turbines and impulse turbines.

The precise shape of water turbine blades is a function of the supply pressure of water, and the type of impeller selected.

=== Reaction turbines ===
Reaction turbines are acted on by water, which changes pressure as it moves through the turbine and gives up its energy. They must be encased to contain the water pressure (or suction), or they must be fully submerged in the water flow.

Newton's third law describes the transfer of energy for reaction turbines.

Most water turbines in use are reaction turbines and are used in low (<30 m or 100 ft) and medium (30–300 m or 100–1,000 ft) head applications. In reaction turbine, pressure drop occurs in both fixed and moving blades. It is largely used in dams and large power plants.

=== Impulse turbines ===
Impulse turbines change the velocity of a water jet. The jet pushes on the turbine's curved blades which changes the direction of the flow. The resulting change in momentum (impulse) causes a force on the turbine blades. Since the turbine is spinning, the force acts through a distance (work) and the diverted water flow is left with diminished energy. An impulse turbine is one in which the pressure of the fluid flowing over the rotor blades is constant and all the work output is due to the change in kinetic energy of the fluid.

Prior to hitting the turbine blades, the water's pressure (potential energy) is converted to kinetic energy by a nozzle and focused on the turbine. No pressure change occurs at the turbine blades, and the turbine doesn't require a housing for operation.

Newton's second law describes the transfer of energy for impulse turbines.

Impulse turbines are often used in very high (>300 m or 1000 ft) head applications.

=== Power ===
The power available in a stream is;

$P=\eta\cdot\rho\cdot g\cdot h\cdot Q$

where:

- $P=$ power (J/s or watts)
- $\eta=$ turbine efficiency
- $\rho=$ density of fluid (kg/m^{3})
- $g=$ acceleration of gravity (9.81 m/s^{2})
- $h=$ head (m). For still water, this is the difference in height between the inlet and outlet surfaces. Moving water has an additional component added to account for the kinetic energy of the flow. The total head equals the pressure head plus velocity head.
- $Q =$ volumetric flow rate (m^{3}/s)

=== Pumped-storage hydroelectricity ===
Some water turbines are designed for pumped-storage hydroelectricity. They can reverse flow and operate as pumps to fill a high reservoir during off-peak electrical hours, and then revert to a water turbine for power generation during peak electrical demand. This type of turbine is usually a Deriaz or Francis turbine in design. Examples are the 3.6 GW Fengning in China, the 3 GW Bath County in USA, and numerous others.

=== Efficiency ===
Large modern water turbines operate at mechanical efficiencies greater than 90%.

== Types of water turbines ==
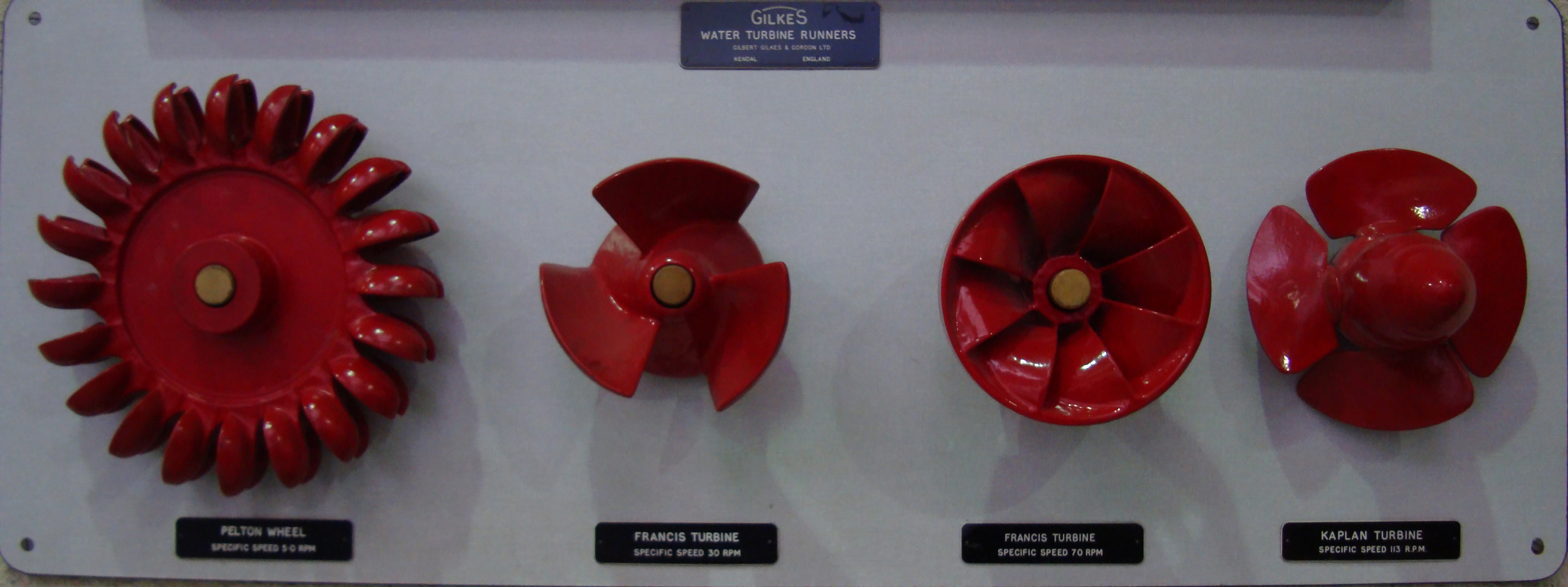
Various types of water turbine runners. From left to right: Pelton wheel, two types of Francis turbine and Kaplan turbine.

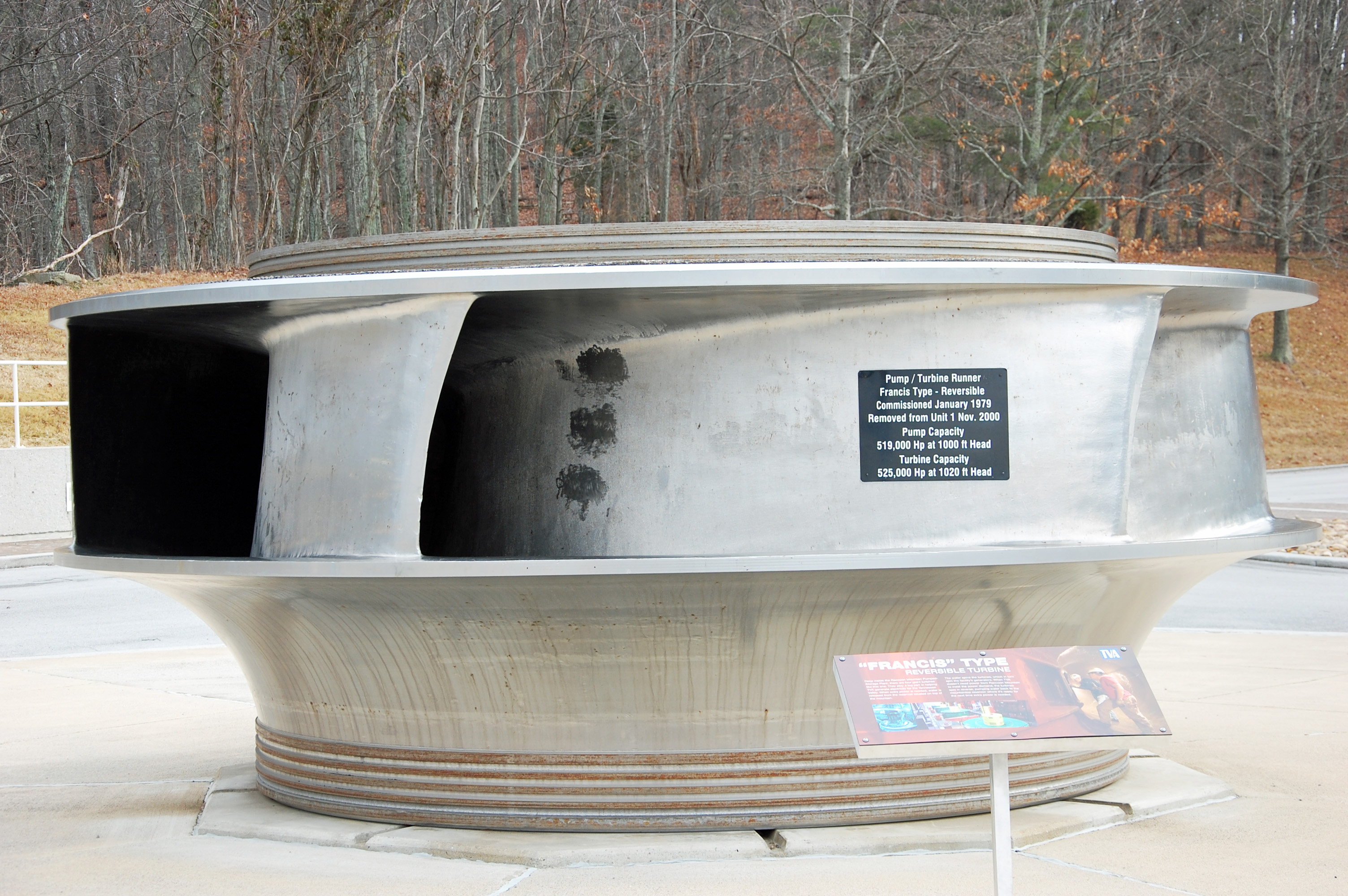
A decommissioned Francis turbine runner on display at the Raccoon Mountain Pumped-Storage Plant

=== Reaction turbines ===
- Kaplan turbine
- Francis turbine
- Tyson turbine
- Deriaz turbine
- Gorlov helical turbine

=== Impulse turbine ===
- Water wheel
- Pelton wheel
- Turgo turbine
- Cross-flow turbine (also known as the Bánki-Michell turbine, or Ossberger turbine)
- Jonval turbine
- Reverse overshot water-wheel
- Screw turbine
- Barkh Turbine

== Design and application ==
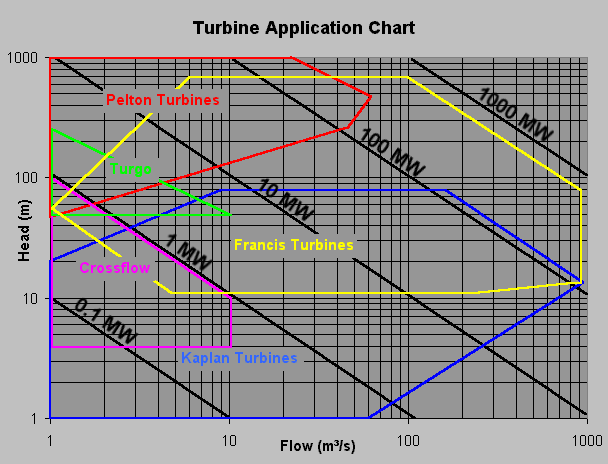

Turbine selection is based on the available water head, and less so on the available flow rate. In general, impulse turbines are used for high head sites, and reaction turbines are used for low-head sites. Kaplan turbines with adjustable blade pitch are well-adapted to wide ranges of flow or head conditions, since their peak efficiency can be achieved over a wide range of flows.

Small turbines (mostly under 10 MW) may have horizontal shafts, and even fairly large bulb-type turbines up to 100 MW or so may be horizontal. Very large Francis and Kaplan machines usually have vertical shafts because this makes best use of the available head, and makes installation of a generator more economical. Pelton wheels may be either vertical or horizontal shaft machines because the size of the machine is so much less than the available head. Some impulse turbines use multiple jets per runner to balance shaft thrust. This also allows for the use of a smaller turbine runner, which can decrease costs and mechanical losses. As of 2021, the largest turbines are the 1,000 MW turbine/generators in each of the 16 assemblies in the Baihetan Dam.

Typical range of heads
type	head (in m)
Water wheel	0.2 to 4
Screw turbine	1 to 10
VLH turbine	1.5 to 4.5
Kaplan turbine	2 to 70
Francis turbine	10 to 300
Turgo turbine	50 to 250
Pelton wheel	80 to 1600

=== Specific speed ===
The specific speed $n_s$ of a turbine characterizes the turbine's shape in a way that is not related to its size. This allows a new turbine design to be scaled from an existing design of known performance. The specific speed is also the main criteria for matching a specific hydro site with the correct turbine type. The specific speed is the speed with which the turbine turns for a particular discharge Q, with unit head and thereby is able to produce unit power.

=== Affinity laws ===
Affinity laws allow the output of a turbine to be predicted based on model tests. A miniature replica of a proposed design, about one foot (0.3 m) in diameter, can be tested and the laboratory measurements applied to the final application with high confidence. Affinity laws are derived by requiring similitude between the test model and the application.

Flow through the turbine is controlled either by a large valve or by wicket gates arranged around the outside of the turbine runner. Differential head and flow can be plotted for a number of different values of gate opening, producing a hill diagram used to show the efficiency of the turbine at varying conditions.

=== Runaway speed ===
The runaway speed of a water turbine is its speed at full flow, and no shaft load. The turbine will be designed to survive the mechanical forces of this speed. The manufacturer will supply the runaway speed rating.

== Control systems ==
Operation of a flyball governor to control speeds of a water turbine

Different designs of governors have been used since the mid-18th century to control the speeds of the water turbines. A variety of flyball systems, or first-generation governors, were used during the first 100 years of water turbine speed controls. In early flyball systems, the flyball component countered by a spring acted directly to the valve of the turbine or the wicket gate to control the amount of water that enters the turbines. Newer systems with mechanical governors started around 1880. An early mechanical governor is a servomechanism that comprises a series of gears that use the turbine's speed to drive the flyball and turbine's power to drive the control mechanism. The mechanical governors were continued to be enhanced in power amplification through the use of gears and the dynamic behavior. By 1930, the mechanical governors had many parameters that could be set on the feedback system for precise controls. In the later part of the twentieth century, electronic governors and digital systems started to replace the mechanical governors. In the electronic governors, also known as second-generation governors, the flyball was replaced by rotational speed sensor but the controls were still done through analog systems. In the modern systems, also known as third-generation governors, the controls are performed digitally by algorithms that are programmed to the computer of the governor.

=== Wicket gate ===
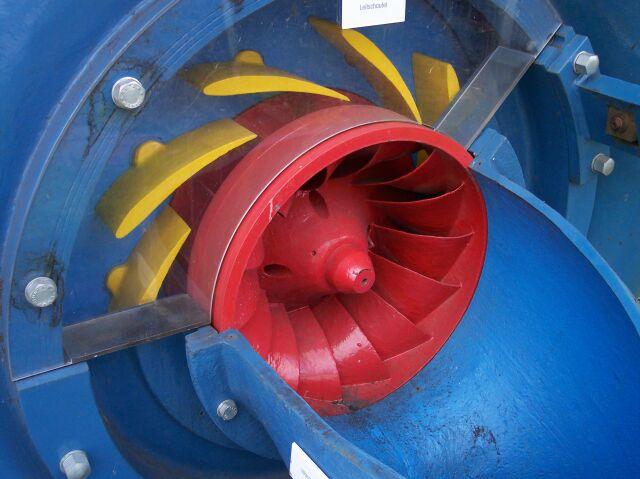
Wicket gates (yellow) surrounding a Francis type turbine. Varying their angle manages water flow, thereby regulating turbine speed and energy produced by it.

A wicket gate, or guide vane, is a ring of gates (or vanes) surrounding a water turbine which control the flow of water entering it; varying the aperture between them manages the rate of the turbine's spin, and thereby the amount of electricity generated.

== Turbine blade materials ==
Given that the turbine blades in a water turbine are constantly exposed to water and dynamic forces, they need to have high corrosion resistance and strength. The most common material used in overlays on carbon steel runners in water turbines are austenitic steel alloys that have 17% to 20% chromium to increase stability of the film which improves aqueous corrosion resistance. The chromium content in these steel alloys exceed the minimum of 12% chromium required to exhibit some atmospheric corrosion resistance. Having a higher chromium concentration in the steel alloys allows for a much longer lifespan of the turbine blades. The blades are typically made of martensitic stainless steels which have higher strength compared to austenitic stainless steels by a factor of 2. Along with corrosion resistance and strength, weldability and density are important criteria for turbine blade material selection. Greater weldability allows for easier and high quality repairs. Low-density allows higher efficiency through easier rotation. The most common material used in Kaplan Turbine blades are stainless steel alloys (SS). The martensitic stainless steel alloys have high strength that allow thinner sections than standard carbon steel; reduced mass enhances the hydrodynamic flow conditions and efficiency of the water turbine. The SS(13Cr-4Ni) has been shown to have improved erosion resistance at all angles of attack through the process of laser peening. It is important to minimize erosion in order to maintain high efficiencies because erosion negatively impacts the hydraulic profile of the blades which reduces the relative ease of rotation.

== Maintenance ==
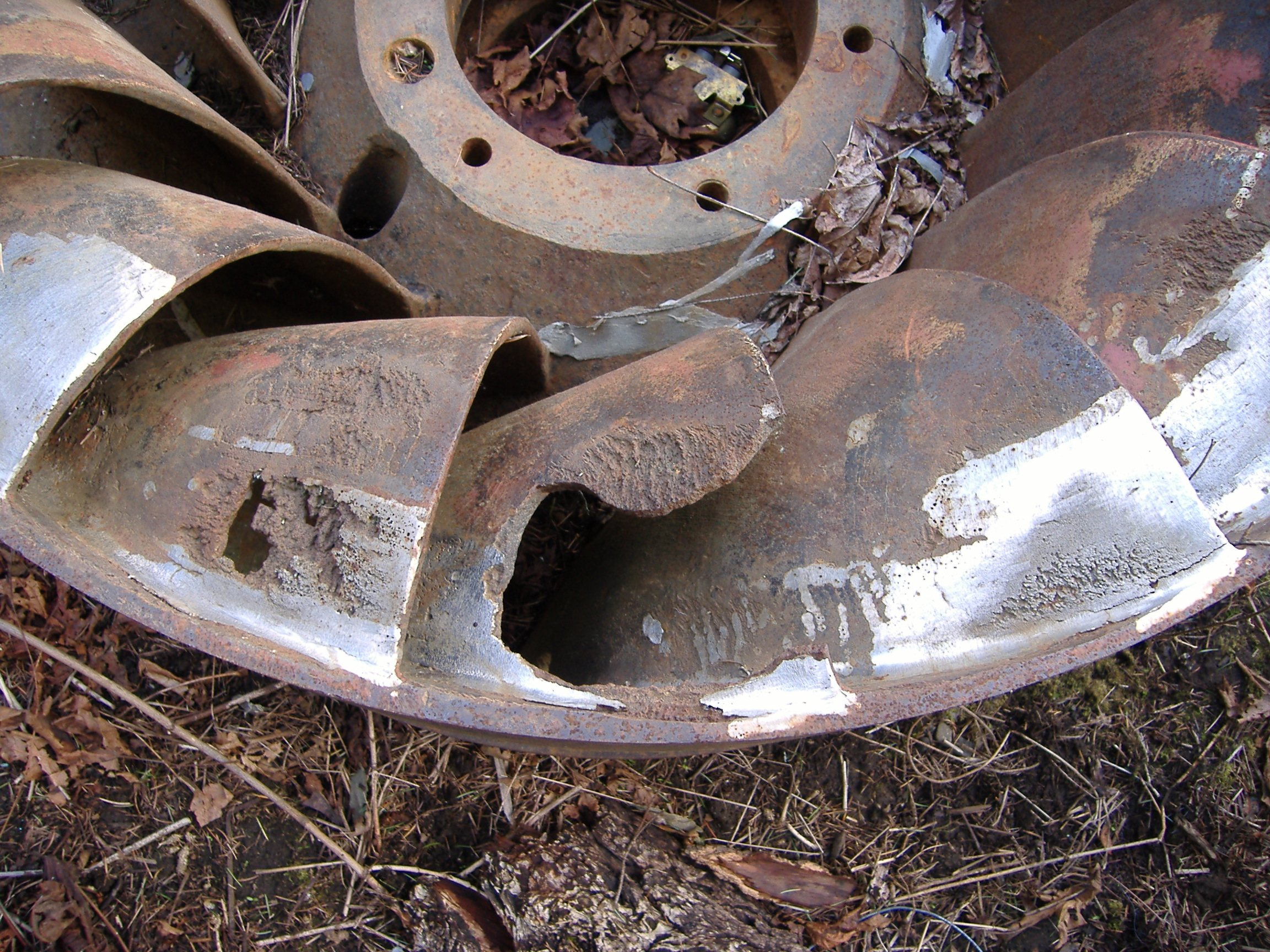
A Francis turbine at the end of its life showing pitting corrosion, fatigue cracking and a catastrophic failure. Earlier repair jobs that used stainless steel weld rods are visible.

Turbines are designed to run for decades with very little maintenance of the main elements; overhaul intervals are on the order of several years. Maintenance of the runners and parts exposed to water include removal, inspection, and repair of worn parts.

Normal wear and tear includes pitting corrosion from cavitation, fatigue cracking, and abrasion from suspended solids in the water. Steel elements are repaired by welding, usually with stainless steel rods. Damaged areas are cut or ground out, then welded back up to their original or an improved profile. Old turbine runners may have a significant amount of stainless steel added this way by the end of their lifetime. Elaborate welding procedures may be used to achieve the highest quality repairs.

Other elements requiring inspection and repair during overhauls include bearings, packing box and shaft sleeves, servomotors, cooling systems for the bearings and generator coils, seal rings, wicket gate linkage elements, and all surfaces.

== Environmental impact ==
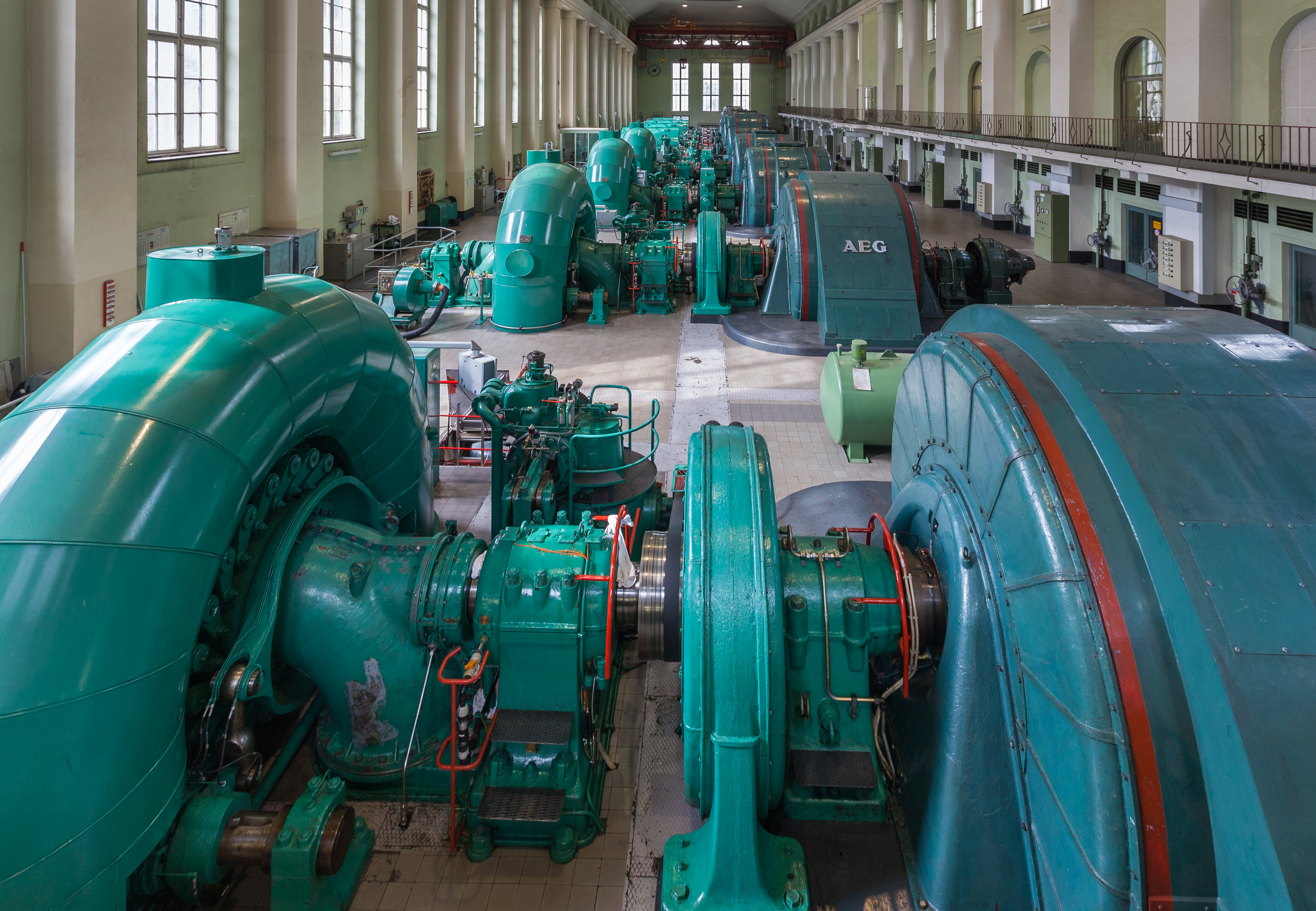
Walchensee Hydroelectric Power Station in Bavaria, Germany, has been in operation since 1924

Water turbines are generally considered a clean power producer, as the turbine causes essentially no change to the water. They use a renewable energy source and are designed to operate for decades. They produce a significant portion of the world's electrical supply.

Negative consequences of water turbines are mostly associated with the dams normally required for their operation. Dams alter the natural ecology of rivers, potentially killing fish, stopping migrations, and disrupting livelihoods. Dams also cause less obvious, but potentially serious, consequences, including increased evaporation of water (especially in arid regions), buildup of silt behind the dam, and changes to water temperature and flow patterns. In the United States, it is illegal to block the migration of fish, so dam builders must provide fish ladders for species such as salmon and white sturgeon.

== See also ==
- Archimedes' screw
- Carbon offsets and credits
- Carbon tax
- Hydroelectricity

== Sources ==
- Donners, K.; Waelkens, M.; Deckers, J. (2002), "Water Mills in the Area of Sagalassos: A Disappearing Ancient Technology", Anatolian Studies, vol. 52, British Institute at Ankara, pp. 1–17, doi:10.2307/3643076, JSTOR 3643076, S2CID 163811541
- Robert Sackett, Preservationist, PRSHPO (Original 1990 draft). Arleen Pabon, Certifying Official and State Historic Preservation Officer, State Historic Preservation Office, San Juan, Puerto Rico. September 9, 1994. In National Register of Historic Places Registration Form—Hacienda Buena Vista. Washington, D.C.: United States Department of the Interior, National Park Service.
- Wikander, Örjan (2000), "The Water-Mill", in Wikander, Örjan (ed.), Handbook of Ancient Water Technology, Technology and Change in History, vol. 2, Leiden: Brill, pp. 371–400, ISBN 90-04-11123-9
- Wilson, Andrew (1995), "Water-Power in North Africa and the Development of the Horizontal Water-Wheel", Journal of Roman Archaeology, vol. 8, pp. 499–510
