= River Tromie =

Right bank tributary of the River Spey in northeast Scotland

Coordinates: 57°05′N 4°00′W

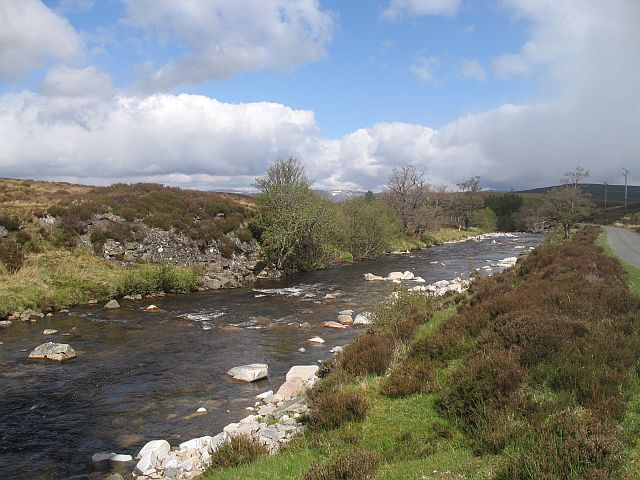
River Tromie near Kingussie

The River Tromie (Scottish Gaelic: Tromaidh / Abhainn Tromaidh) is a right bank tributary of the River Spey in northeast Scotland. It emerges from the northern end of Loch an t-Seilich within the Gaick Forest and flows northwards, then northwestwards down through Glen Tromie to Bhran Cottage where it turns to the north-northeast. It is bridged by the B970 road at Tromie Bridge near Drumguish and flows a further 1.25 miles (2 km) northwest to meet the Spey near Lynchat.

Loch an t-Seilich is fed by the Allt Loch an Duin which arises at Loch an Duin and passes through Loch Bhrodainn on its way north to Loch an t-Seilich, being joined on its right by the Allt Gharbh Ghaig before it does so.

== Etymology ==
The name 'Tromie' is an anglicisation of the Gaelic word for 'elder tree'.
