= Loch Beinn a' Mheadhoin =

Freshwater loch in Inverness-shire, Scotland

- Loch Benevian
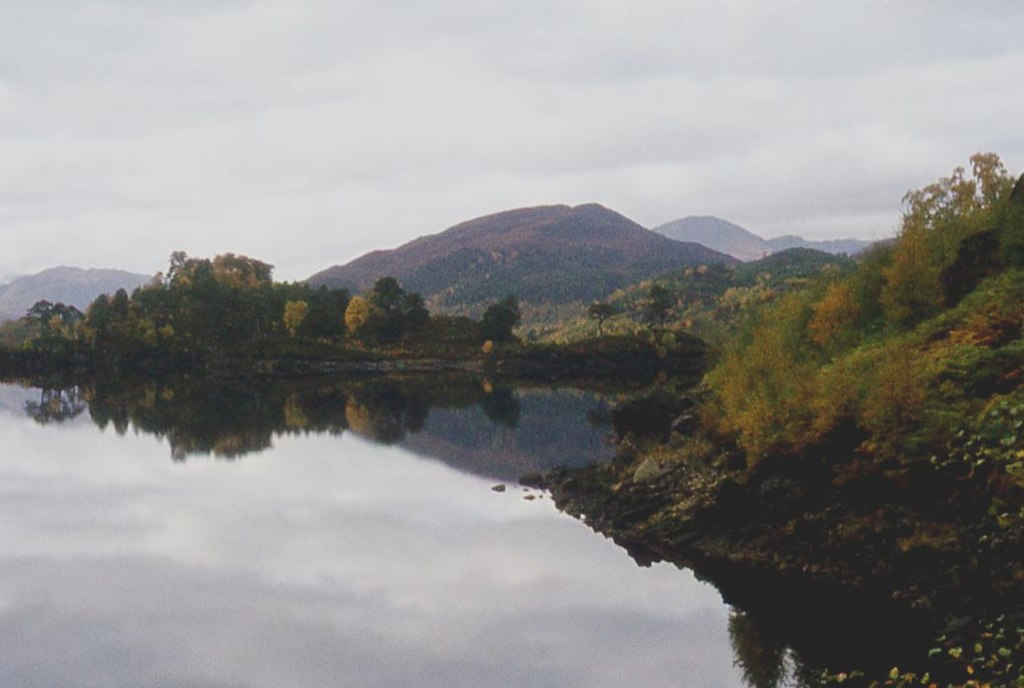
- Loch Beinn a' Mheadhoin from its northern shore, with its namesake mountain, centre

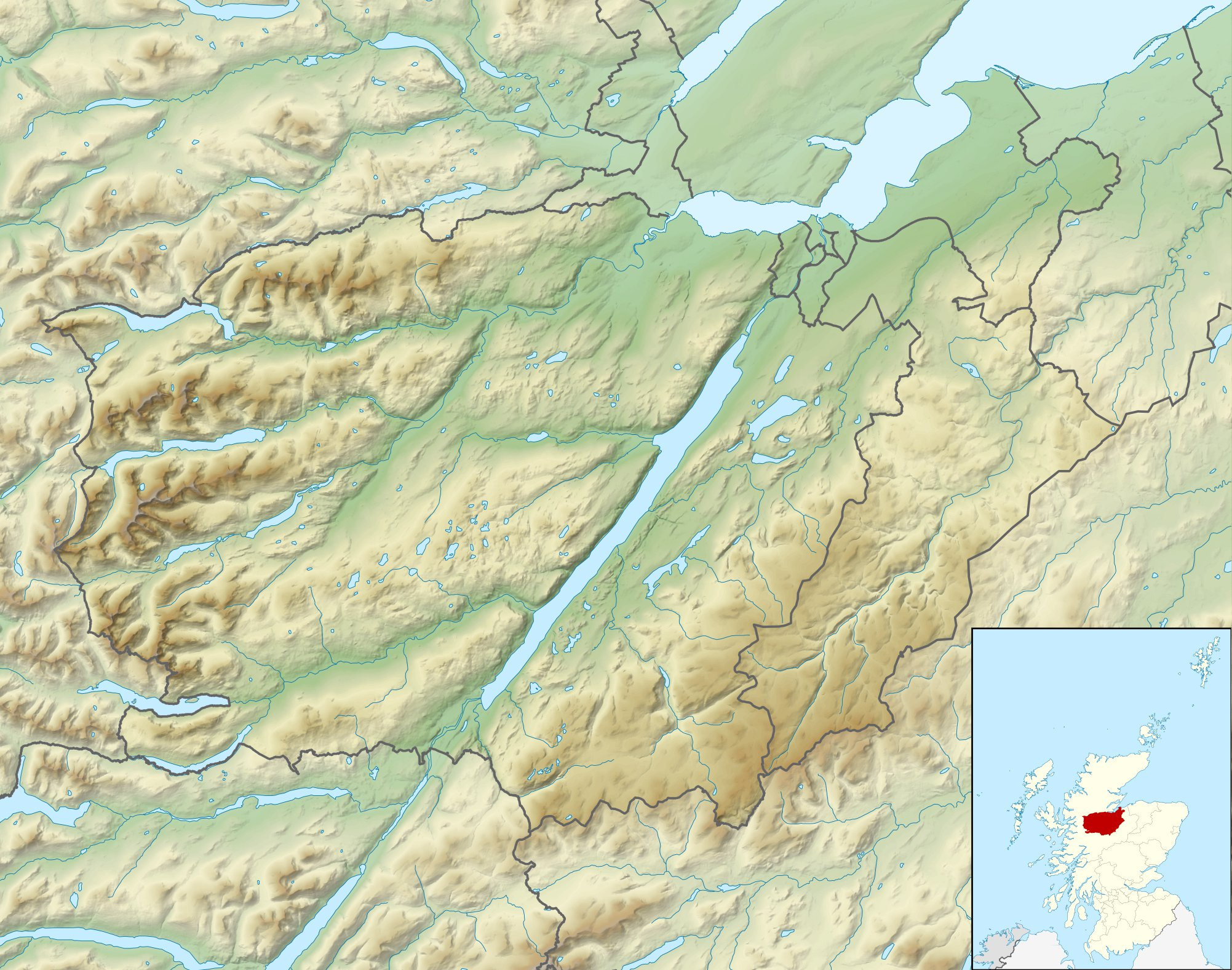
- Location within Inverness area
- Location: Scottish Highlands
- Coordinates: 57°16′45.3″N 4°55′51.4″W
- Primary inflows: Abhainn Gleann nam Fiadh, Allt an Laghair, Allt an Ruighe Dhuibh, Allt na h'Imrich, Garbh Uisge
- Primary outflows: River Affric
- Basin countries: Scotland, United Kingdom
- Max. length: 8.18 km (5.08 mi)
- Max. width: 917 m (3,009 ft)
- Surface elevation: 220 m (720 ft)
- Islands: 7

Loch Beinn a' Mheadhoin (Anglicised as Loch Benevian) is a freshwater loch in Inverness-shire, Scotland. It is one of several lochs in Glen Affric, a National Nature Reserve within Scotland's Caledonian Forest.

The loch is named after the mountain on its northwest shore, Beinn a' Mheadhoin, which translates from Scottish Gaelic to "Middle Mountain".

The Affric-Kintail Way runs along the loch's south shore.

In 2016, Scottish rewilding charity Trees for Life planted aspen along Loch Beinn a' Mheadhoin's shores to support the reintroduction of beavers. The first beaver kits were born in 2026.

The loch was partially expanded in the 1950s as part of the Affric-Beauly hydro-electric power scheme, drawing water from Loch Mullardoch to the north via a 5.5 km long tunnel. To this end, the loch has a small dam at its east end, and its water levels are artificially controlled.

Within the centre of the lake lies a small island accessible by foot. Referred to as “Stone Island” by locals, named after the many stones found on the beach, the area offers visitors a scenic retreat with gorgeous views of the entire lake.
