= Rhidorroch =

Forest in Highland, Scotland

Coordinates: 57.939°N 4.981°W

Rhidorroch (Scottish Gaelic: An Ruigh Dhorcha) is a deer forest east of Ullapool, Ross-shire, Scotland, centred on the extended catchment of the Ullapool River. It is divided into two farms and sporting estates: Rhidorroch Estate and East Rhidorroch Estate.
