= Mam Sodhail =

Mountain in Scotland

Coordinates: 57.279801°N 5.120267°W

- Màm Sabhail
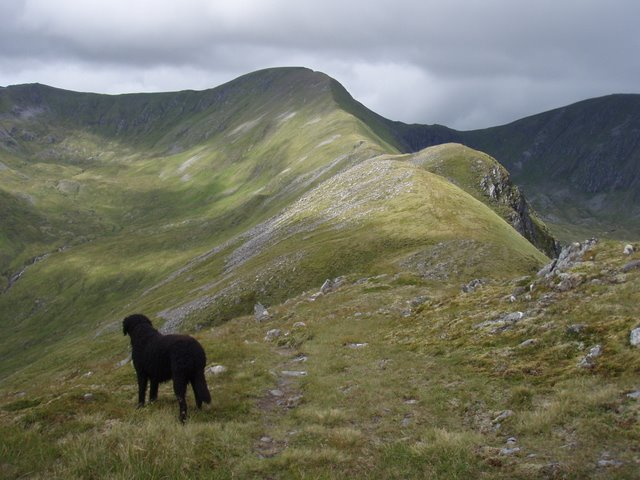
- Mam Sodhail (top middle) seen from Mullach Cadha Rainich to the east

Highest point
- Elevation: 1,181 m (3,875 ft)
- Prominence: c. 137 m
- Listing: Munro

Naming
- English translation: rounded hill of barns
- Language of name: Gaelic
- Pronunciation: Scottish Gaelic: [mamˈs̪o.al]

Geography
- Location: Glen Affric, Scotland
- Parent range: Northwest Highlands
- OS grid: NH119253
- Topo map: OS Landranger 25, OS Explorer 414

Listed summits of Mam Sodhail
Name	Grid ref	Height	Status
An Tudair	NH127239	1074 m (3523 ft)	Munro Top
Creag Coire nan Each	NH112232	1055 m (3461 ft)	Munro Top
Sgurr na Lapaich	NH154243	1036 m (3399 ft)	Munro Top
Mullach Cadha Rainich	NH139246	996 m (3267 ft)	Munro Top

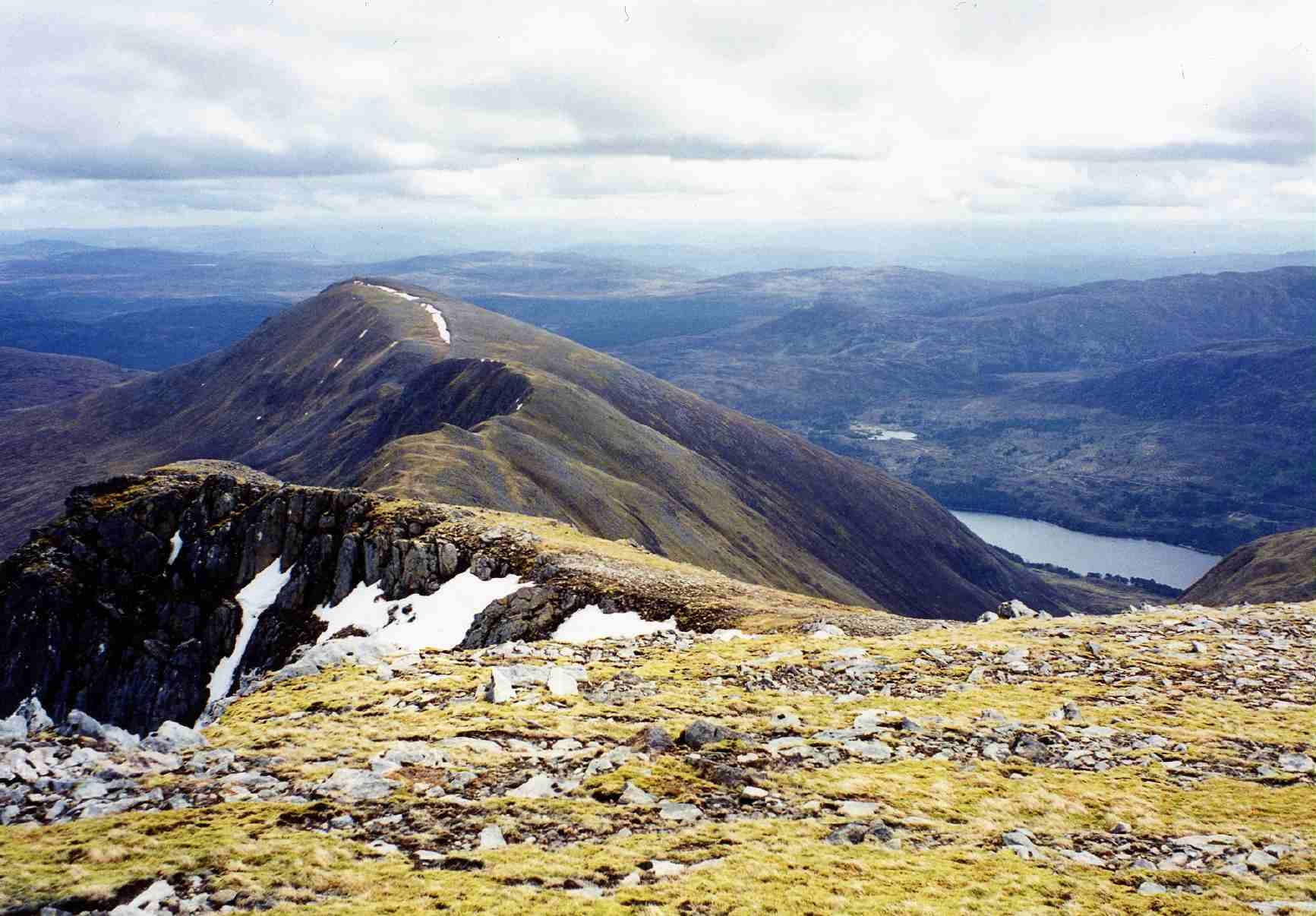
Looking down the long ESE ridge to the "top" Sgurr na Lapaich.

Mam Sodhail, or Màm Sabhail in Gaelic (meaning "rounded mountain of barns"), sometimes anglicised "Mam Soul", is a mountain with a height of 1,181 metres (3,875 ft) in the Northwest Highlands of Scotland. Classed as a Munro, it is beside Carn Eige in the secluded country on the northern side of Glen Affric, some 30 kilometres east of Kyle of Lochalsh.

== Landscape ==
At 1181 metres (3875 feet), it is the second highest mountain north of the Great Glen (after neighbouring Càrn Eige) and the fourteenth highest in the United Kingdom. Càrn Eige stands just one kilometre to the north of Mam Sodhail and the two are regarded as twin mountains, being roughly identical in height and appearance. They stand together above Gleann nam Fiadh (Glen of the Deer) and are linked by a high col of around 1045 metres, making the traverse of the two mountains a natural day's walk.

Mam Sodhail is mostly grassy without too much rock, however its sheer size, long ridges, and fine corries together with its four "tops" named in the Munro Tables make it a first-rate mountain. The hill casts three ridges down towards Glen Affric, the most impressive of these being the east southeast ridge, which has two "tops" on it; Mullach Cadha Rainich (996 metres) stands at the midpoint of the ridge which runs for four kilometres to conclude at the other “top” of Sgurr na Lapaich (1036 metres), which is the most prominent part of the mountain when viewed from Glen Affric. It has the characteristics of a separate mountain and was regarded as a Munro in the original 1891 list, with Irvine Butterfield saying, "The peak certainly does not lack character and many were disappointed to find that its original status was not restored in the seventh edition of Munros Tables". The other two ridges, which form a horseshoe around the Allt Coulavie valley to the south of the summit, carry the “tops” of An Tudair (1074 metres) and Creag Coire nan Each (1055 metres). The mountain's western flanks fall away towards Gleann a’ Choilich, which drains northwards into Loch Mullardoch.

=== Summit ===
Mam Sodhail was an important part of the Ordnance Survey’s initial mapping of the northern Highlands in the 1840s, and the summit carries a massive cairn which was used by the surveyors in their work. The cairn is hollow and its walls have to be climbed to get inside. Unusually, there is a visitors' book inside the cairn. A few feet below the summit is the remains of a small bothy, complete with walls, fireplace and a chimney, which was formerly used by deerstalkers and watchers to keep sheep and walkers off the mountain. The bothy was mentioned by Sir Hugh Munro in volume one of the Scottish Mountaineering Club Journal along with tips to circumvent it and its inhabitants. There is evidence of some quarrying south-west of the main summit on the ridge to Creag Coire nan Each. There are a number of pits about three metres deep and several metres across, and it is probable that this was the source of the stone for the summit cairn and the bothy.

== Climbing ==
The ascent of Mam Sodhail starts at the car park at the road end in Glen Affric at grid reference NH200233. The walker can either ascend by a stalker's path up Coire Leachavie, or by climbing Sgurr na Lapaich first and then following the long ESE ridge to the top of the mountain. The view from the top takes in the impressive sights of Sgurr nan Ceathreamhnan and Càrn Eige close by and the distant view is crowded by the mountains of the north-west Highlands. Most walkers will take in the nearby Carn Eige as part of the walk and strong walkers may take the opportunity to climb the remote Munro of Beinn Fhionnlaidh, which lies three kilometres to the north and is difficult to access from any other place.

== See also ==
- Breast-shaped hill
- List of Munro mountains
- Mountains and hills of Scotland

== References and Footnotes ==
- The Munros (SMC Guide), Donald Bennett et al., ISBN 978-0-907521-13-6
- 100 Best Routes on Scottish Mountains, Ralph Storer, ISBN 978-0-7515-0300-5
- Hamish’s Mountain Walk, Hamish Brown, ISBN 978-1-898573-08-1
- The Munros and Tops, Chris Townsend, ISBN 1-84018-727-1
- The High Mountains of Britain and Ireland, Irvine Butterfield, ISBN 0-906371-30-9

Footnotes
