= Loch Affric =

Lake in the Highlands of Scotland

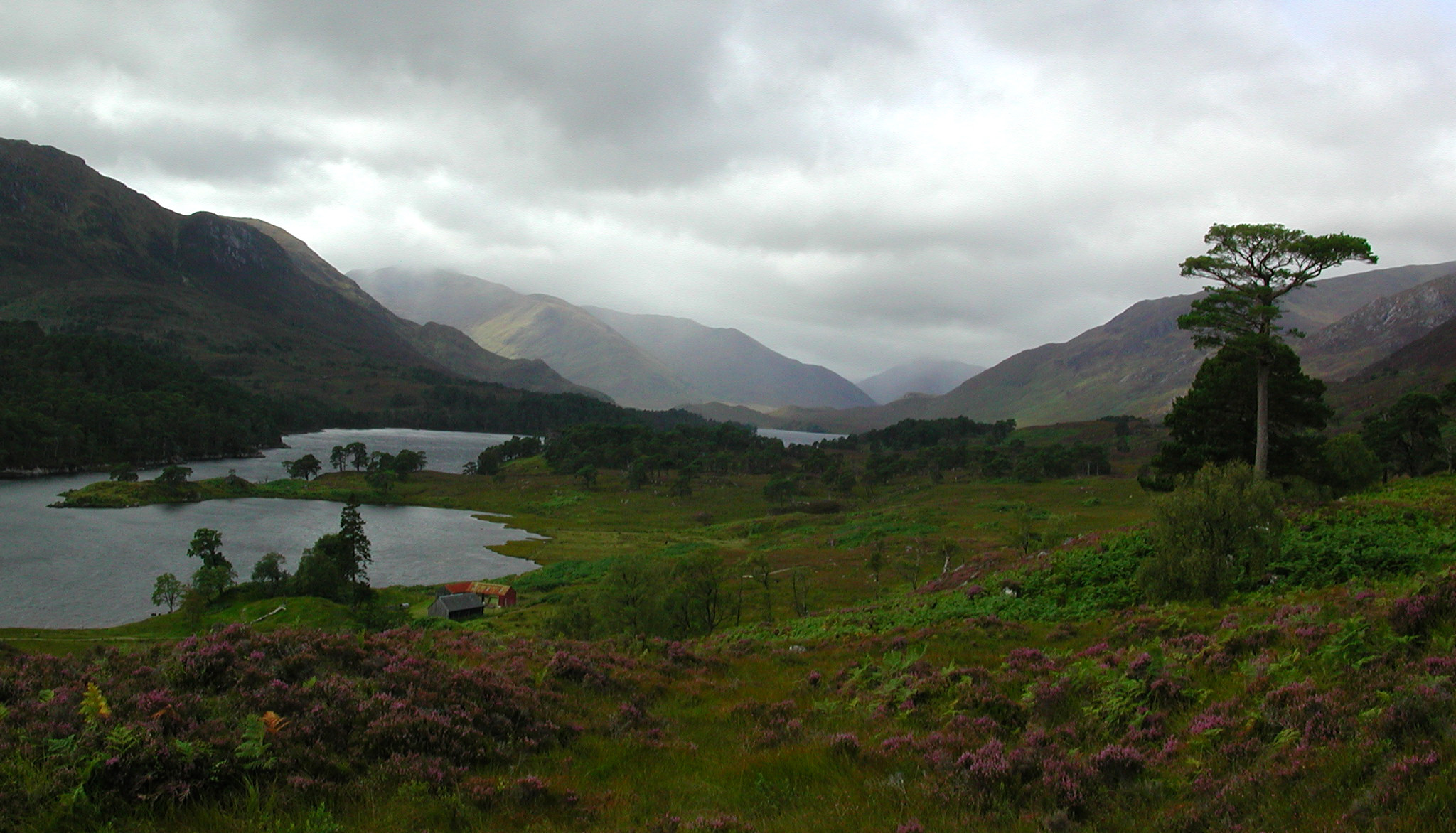
- Looking west over Loch Affric

- Location within Scotland
- Location: Inverness-shire, Highland (council area), Scotland
- Coordinates: 57°15′14.267″N 5°3′23.429″W
- Primary outflows: River Affric
- Basin countries: Scotland
- Max. length: 5 km (3.1 mi)
- Surface area: 2.13 km^{2} (0.82 sq mi)
- Average depth: 29 m (94 ft)
- Max. depth: 67.4 m (221.1 ft)
- Water volume: 6.06 km^{3} (1.45 cu mi)
- Surface elevation: 235 m (771 ft)

Loch Affric is a freshwater loch within Glen Affric, in the Highland council area of Scotland. It lies about 25 miles (40 km) southwest of Beauly. The loch sits in a national nature reserve known for being home to a number of rare species and the loch itself is popular for trout fishing. An annual duathlon is held on the banks of the loch in May and the loch has been widely used as the backdrop in films.

== Geography ==
Loch Affric is one of two large lochs within Glen Affric, further up the glen to the southwest of Loch Beinn a' Mheadhoin. The River Affric is the main inflow and outflow for both lochs.

A number of smaller lochs surround Loch Affric. At the southwestern end sits Loch Coulavie located at the base An Tudair Beag and a slightly higher elevation. Also, at the southwestern end, the river Affric flows into the tiny loch of Loch na Camaig. At the northeastern side, Loch Pollan Fearna drains into Loch Affric.

Much of the area around the loch is mountainous. To the north, is Sgùrr na Lapaich (1,074 m; 3,524 ft) and An Tudair (1,036 m; 3,399 ft), outlying Munro Tops of Mam Sodhail. To the south lie the Corbetts of Aonach Shasuinn (888 m; 2,913 ft) and Carn a' Choire Ghairbh (865 m; 2,838 ft).

== Botany & wildlife ==
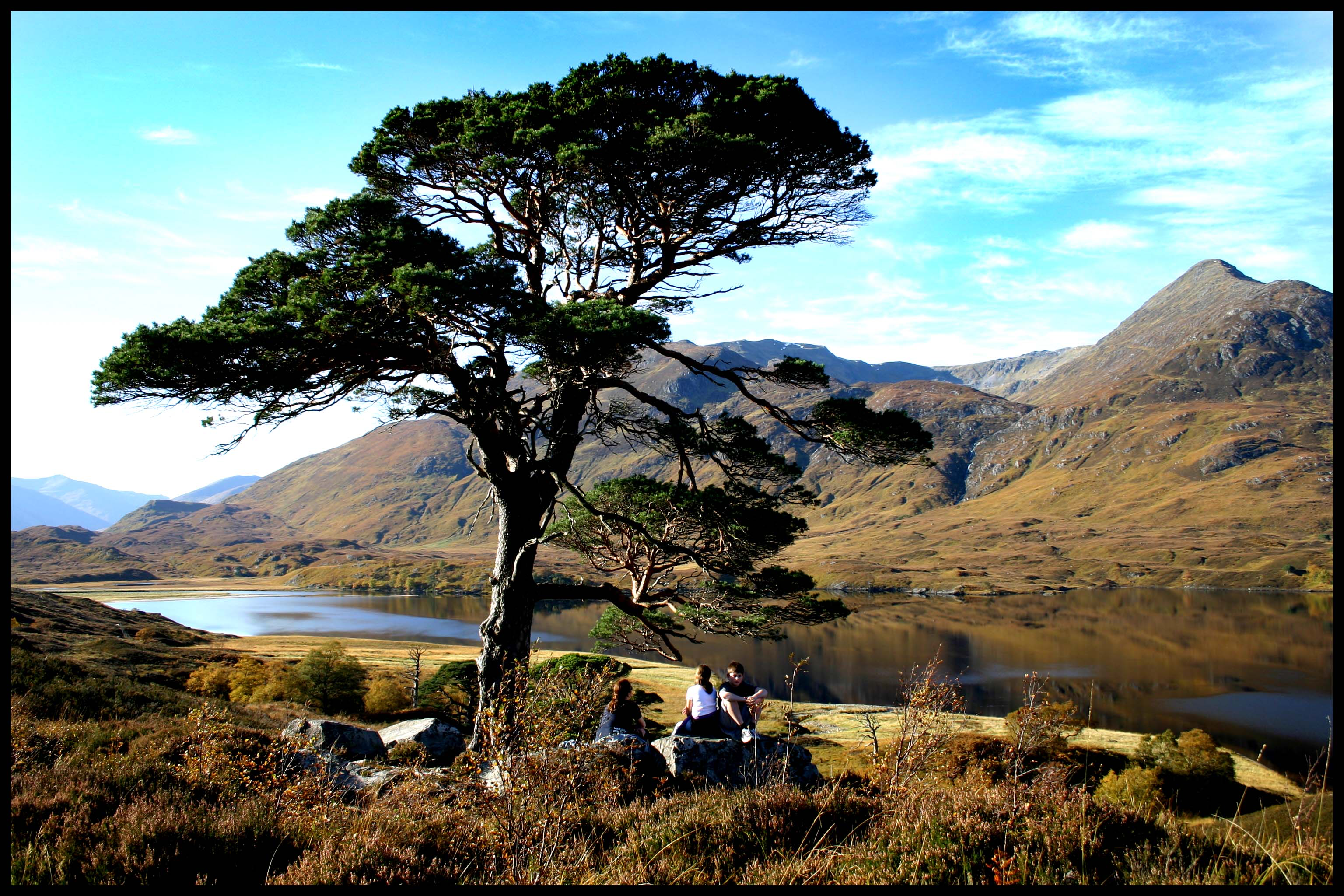
Loch Affric

The loch sits within the Glen Affric national nature reserve, the banks of the loch are made up of woodland with a mixture of Scots pine, silver birch, and other pine trees. Wildlife, which is rare in Great Britain noted to live in the nature reserve includes pine marten, Scottish wildcat, otter, red squirrel and golden eagle. The Scottish crossbill is also known to live in significant numbers in the Scots pine on the shores of Loch Affric. Rare dragonfly are noted to be frequently seen near the shores of Loch Affric. These include azure hawker, downy emerald, brilliant emerald, northern emerald and white-faced darter.

Loch Affric is home to brown trout with fishermen reporting an average weight of a catch at 8 ounces (230 g) up to around fish weighing 5 pounds (2.3 kg). During an average fishing season around 1,000 trout are caught on the loch. Fishing is restricted to boat fishing only with permission controlled by the nearby Glen Affric Lodge.

== Hydro-electric development ==
In 1929 the building of a hydroelectric dam by the Grampian electricity supply company on Loch Affric was considered. However, following public fallout regarding some schemes developed in the preceding decade in Perthshire changes were made by the board to the original scheme to flood Glen Affric. Instead of damming Loch Affric, the nearby Loch Benevean would be dammed by the North of Scotland Hydro-Electric Board in the late 1940s resulting in a level rise of only twenty-five feet (7.6 m) and only one residential property would be lost. In turn the process of building the dam was reported to create around two-thousand jobs.

== Film ==
Loch Affric has been used as a recording location for a number of Hollywood films. These include Victoria & Abdul (2017), Detective Pikachu (2019), Dog Soldiers (2002) and Valhalla Rising (2009).
