= Glencarron Estate =

Coordinates: 57°30′29″N 05°14′01″W

The Glencarron Estate is a 4,000 acre highland estate in Wester Ross. It provides sports facilities for fishing (river and loch) and manages a healthy red deer population. Several cottages and lodges are available for holiday lets. It is owned by the Douglas family. Extensive amenity woodlands have been created by the family, with 360,000 trees being planted in 2012/13, adding to earlier plantings which now cover 600 hectares, including a Diamond Jubilee wood which was included as part of the Woodland Trust's Jubilee celebrations.
