= Deriaz turbine =

Water turbine

Deriaz turbine

The Deriaz turbine, presented by engineer Paul Deriaz, was the first diagonal hydraulic pump-turbine to be designed. In contrast to most hydraulic machines, the flow in a Deriaz turbine does not follow a full axial nor radial direction but is a diagonal mixture of the two. Deriaz turbines, like Kaplan turbines, can also have adjustable runner blades to reach highest efficiencies at variable discharge (double regulation). Deriaz turbines are installed at the Sir Adam Beck Pump Generating Station at Niagara Falls.

The combined use of adjustable runner blades with moving guide vanes allows Deriaz pump-turbine to reach high performance under a large range of working conditions. This makes the Deriaz pump-turbine an extremely suitable turbomachine solution for high variable load. Recent investigation supported by experimental data and computational fluid dynamics (CFD) simulations, shows clearly how a downsized prototype preserves versatility over a wide range of partial load for pumping and generating modes.

As the adjustment of runner blades is mechanically complex, Deriaz turbines with fixed blades have been developed. The adjustment to variable discharge is realized by variable runner speed based on modern inverter technology.
