= Killilan =

Coordinates: 57.31715°N 5.40994°W

Killilan: Scottish Gaelic: Cill Fhaolain
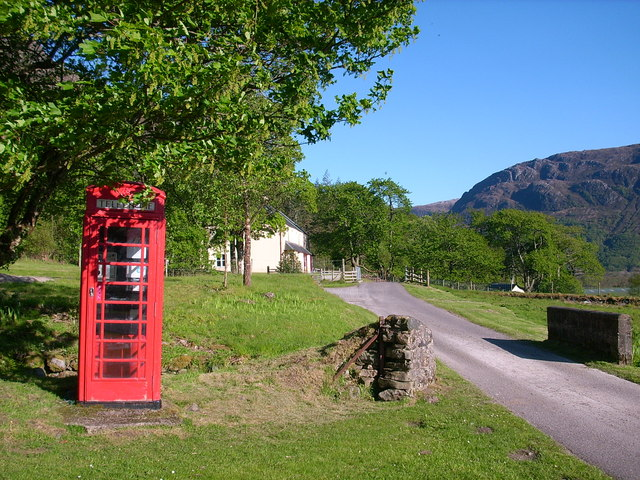
- Street scene

- Location within the Ross and Cromarty area
- OS grid reference: NG947303
- Council area: Highland
- Country: Scotland
- Sovereign state: United Kingdom
- Post town: Kyle of Lochalsh
- Postcode district: IV40 8
- Police: Scotland
- Fire: Scottish
- Ambulance: Scottish

Killilan (Scottish Gaelic: Cill Fhaolain) is a remote hamlet, at the base of Ben Killilan, at the east end of Loch Long, in Lochalsh in the Highlands of Scotland and is in the council area of Highland.
