= Loch Mullardoch =

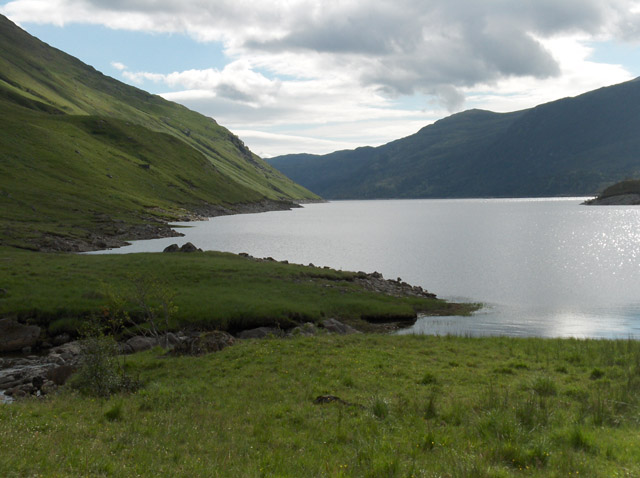
- Loch Mullardoch

- Location within Scotland
- Location: Glen Cannich, Northwest Highlands, Scotland
- Coordinates: 57°20′N 5°00′W
- Type: reservoir

Loch Mullardoch is a major reservoir in Glen Cannich in the Northwest Highlands of Scotland. It was created by the damming in 1951 of the River Cannich just upstream of Mullardoch House, as part of the Affric-Beauly hydro-electric power scheme. A car park at the southern end of the dam is the terminus of the public road up Glen Cannich. The reservoir extends for about 14 km westwards up the glen to the point where the Abhainn a Choilich and Abhainn Sithidh burns drop down from the West Benula deer forest.

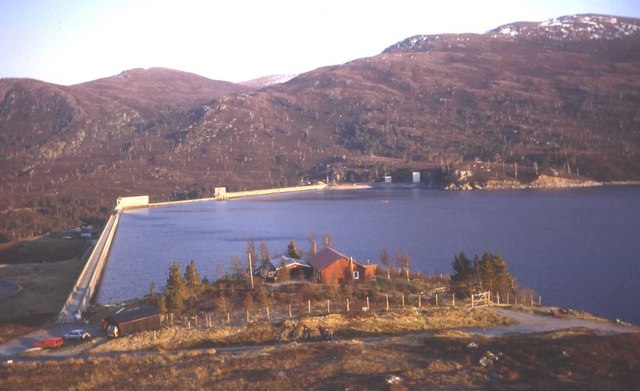
Mullardoch dam

Prior to the construction of the concrete dam, which is the largest in Scotland, the natural Loch Mullardoch stretched for some 7 km along the floor of the glen as far west as Benula Lodge and Benula Old Lodge, the sites of both of which now lay beneath the reservoir's waters. The diminutive Lochan na Cloiche and the larger Loch Lungard were inundated as the reservoir filled.

== See also ==
- http://www.glenaffric.org/glen_cannich.html
- List of reservoirs and dams in the United Kingdom
