= List of energy resources =

These are modes of energy production, energy storage, or energy conservation, listed alphabetically. Note that not all sources are accepted as legitimate or have been proven to be tappable.

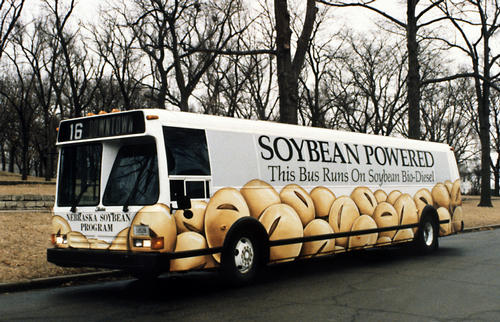
Bus running on soybean biodiesel.

- Atomic energy
- Alternative fuel
- Alternative fuel vehicle
- Banki turbine
- Battery (electricity)
- Bioalcohol
- Biodiesel
- Biodiesel production
- Biofuel
- Biogas
- Biomass
- Bio-nano generator
- Bitumen
- Breeder reactor
- Bubble fusion – a nuclear fusion reaction thought to occur during sonoluminescence, an extreme form of acoustic cavitation.
- Coal
- Coal mining
- Cold fusion
- Combustion
- Compound turbine – two axle, steam
- Compressed air energy storage
- Concentrated solar power
- Deep lake water cooling
- Diesel
- Dyson sphere
- Electrical grid
- Energy tower
- External combustion engine

Spoked flywheel

- Fischer–Tropsch process
- Flywheel (storage)
- Fossil fuel
- Fossil-fuel power station
- Francis turbine
- Fuel – a substance used as a source of energy, usually by the heat produced in combustion
- Fuel cell
- Fuel efficiency
- Fusion power
- Gas turbine
- Gasohol
- Geothermal exchange heat pump
- Geothermal heating
- Geothermal power
- Grid energy storage
- High-altitude wind power – Energy can be captured from the wind by kites, aerostats, airfoil matrices, balloons, bladed turbines, kytoon, tethered gliders, and sailplanes.
- Hydroelectricity
- Hydrogen economy
- Hydrogen storage, Underground hydrogen storage
- Hydropower-Energy from moving water
- Hygroelectricity
- Implosion
- Kaplan turbine
- Light crude oil
- Liquid fuel
- Liquid nitrogen engine
- Marine current power
- Magnetohydrodynamic, generator, MHD generator or dynamo converts thermal or kinetic energy directly into electricity.
- Methane clathrate
- Methanol
- Methanol economy
- Natural gas
- Natural gas field
- Natural gas vehicle
- Nuclear energy – energy in the nucleus or core of atoms
- Nuclear fusion
- Nuclear reactor
- Nuclear reprocessing
- Oil drilling
- Oil platform
- Oil refinery
- Oil shale
- Oil well
- Osmotic power – or salinity gradient power – is the energy available from the difference in the salt concentration between seawater and river water.
- OTEC – ocean thermal energy conversion
- Oxidation
- Peat
- Penrose Mechanism
- Petroleum
- Photovoltaics
- Piezoelectricity
- Pneumatics – compressed air
- Products based on refined oil
- Propellant
- Pumped-storage hydroelectricity
- Pyrolysis
- Quark matter energy
- Renewable energy
- Savonius wind turbine – wind
- Small hydro
- Solar box cooker
- Solar cell
- Solar chimney
- Solar panel
- Solar energy
- Solar power satellite
- Solar thermal energy
- Solar updraft tower – large version of the solar chimney concept
- Solar water heating
- Solid fuel
- Sonoluminescence – the emission of short bursts of light from imploding bubbles in a liquid when excited by sound.
- SSTAR – small, sealed, transportable, autonomous reactor
- Steam turbine
- Stirling engine
- Straight vegetable oil
- Stranded gas reserve
- Sulfur-iodine cycle
- Sustainable design
- Synfuel
- Syngas
- Tar sands
- Tesla turbine
- Thermal depolymerization
- Thermal power station
- Thermoelectric power
- Thorium
- Tidal power
- Transmutation
- Turgo turbine – impulse water turbine designed for medium head applications
- Tyson turbine – for river flow harnessing

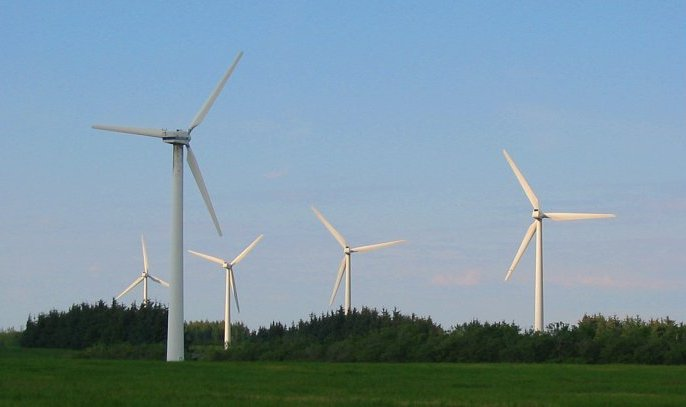

- UASB
- Uranium
- Vacuum energy
- Vibration energy harvesting
- Vortex energy
- Water turbine
- Wave power
- Wind energy
- Wind farm
- Wind turbine
- Wood fuel
- Wood gas
- Zero-point energy
