= Compound engine =

Type of engine

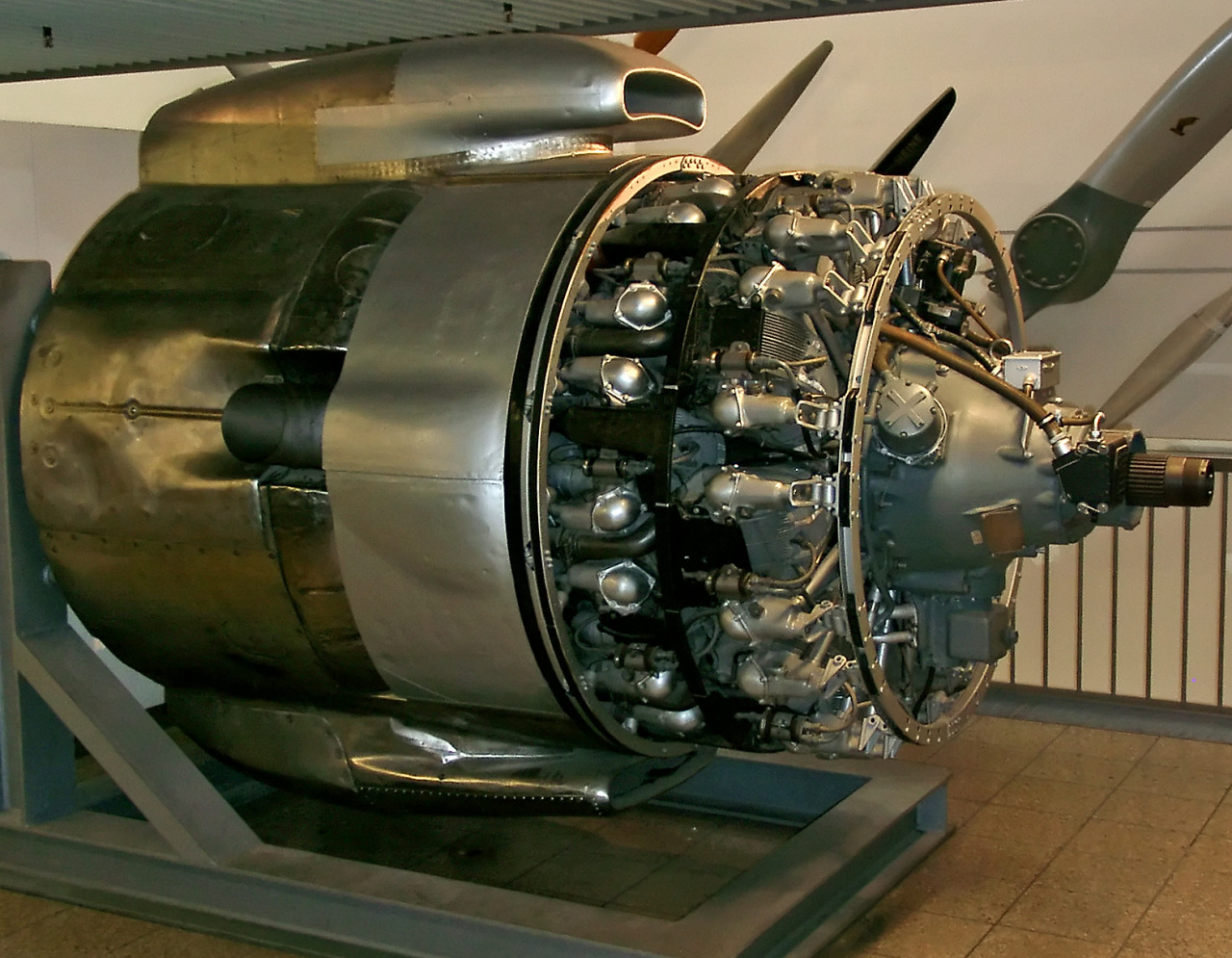
Wright R-3350 Duplex-Cyclone turbo compound engine

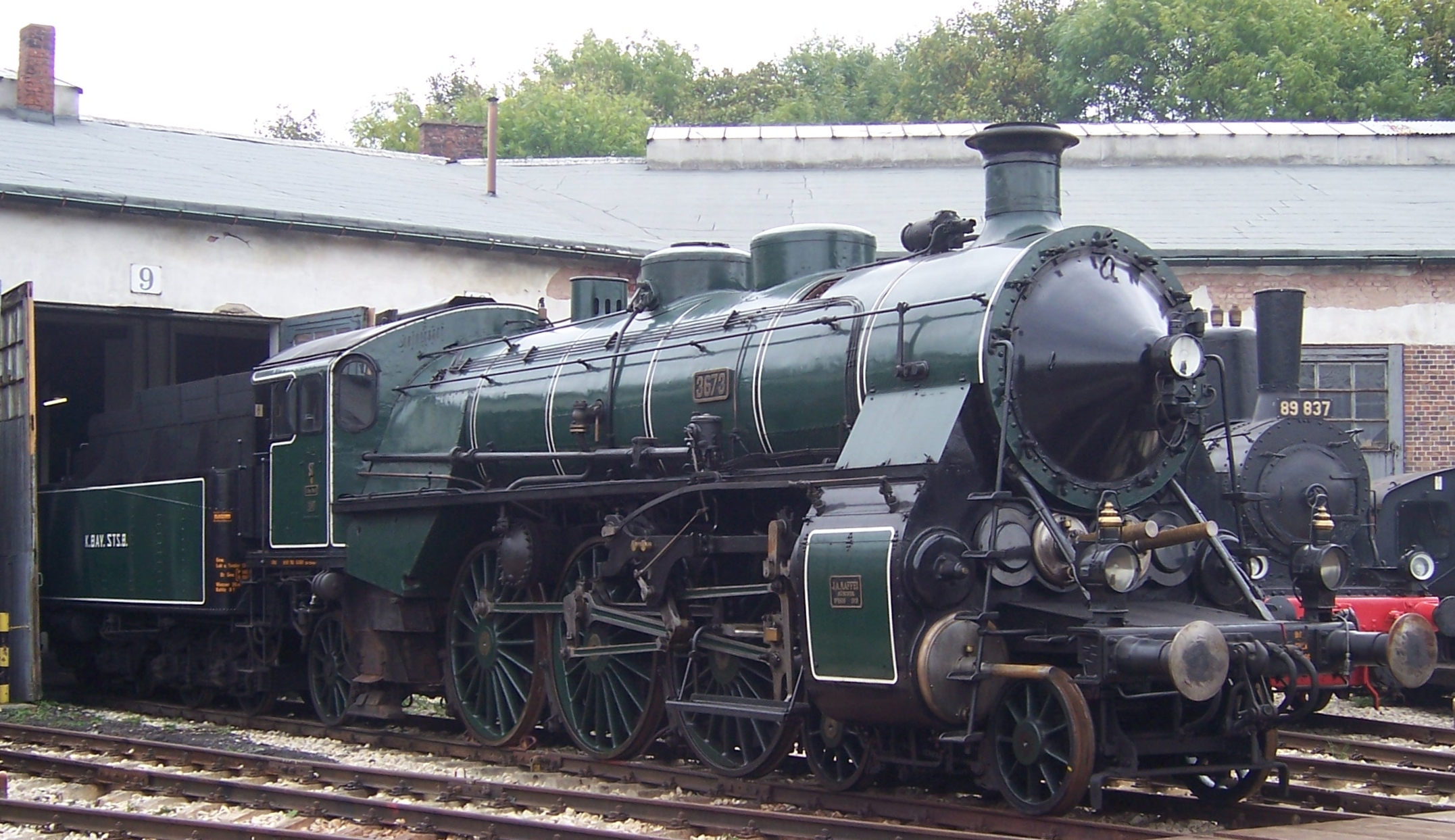
Bavarian S 3/6 compound locomotive, showing the two high-pressure cylinders mounted centrally in the frame and the two slightly larger low-pressure cylinders on either side

A compound engine is an engine that has more than one stage for recovering energy from the same working fluid, with the exhaust from the first stage passing through the second stage, and in some cases then on to another subsequent stage or even stages. Originally invented as a means of making steam engines more efficient, the compounding of engines by use of several stages has also been used on internal combustion engines and continues to have niche markets there.

The stages of a compound engine may be either of differing or of similar technologies, for example:

- In a turbo-compound engine, the exhaust gas from the cylinders passes through a turbine; the recovered energy is then sent back to the crankshaft or auxiliary systems, instead of driving a compressor
- In a compound steam locomotive, the steam passes from the high-pressure cylinder or cylinders to the low-pressure cylinder or cylinders, the two stages being similar.
- In a triple-expansion steam engine, the steam passes through three successive cylinders of increasing size and decreasing pressure. Such engines were the most common marine engines in the golden age of steam.

These examples and compound turbines are the main but not the only uses of compounding in engines; see below.

== Terminology ==
A compound engine uses several stages to produce its output.

Not all engines that use multiple stages are called compound engines. In particular, if an engine uses a later stage purely to extract energy from the exhaust for some other purpose, and notably for turbo charging, is not called a compound engine. Similarly, proposed engines that use a free piston engine to drive a turbine would not be called compound engines, as only the second stage produces output power.

However, if a turbo compound engine is also supercharged by feeding some of the shaft power back to the supercharger, as in some aircraft engines, it is still a compound engine. Usage of the terms supercharged and turbosupercharged has varied with time; for example, the makers of the Wright R-3350 Duplex-Cyclone compound engine described it at the time as turbosupercharged. It is, however, a compound engine, and a similar engine produced today would be described as supercharged rather than turbocharged.

The term compounding is a little less restrictive than compound engine. Large compound turbines are an application of compounding, as are the multiple rows of blades used in many gas turbines, but neither is normally referred to as a compound engine. The several sets of blades in a single turbine are perhaps better thought of as similar in principle to the uniflow steam engine than to compounding. Unlike the uniflow steam engine, which has found niche uses only, multiple-row turbines have found enormous practical application.

An engine that does not use compounding is referred to as a simple engine, particularly in the case of a steam locomotive, or more precisely as a simple expansion engine, particularly in the case of a marine steam engine.

Note however that in the case of any steam engine, simple engine can also be used to mean one that does not use a condenser to generate negative pressure and so improve efficiency. Use of separate condensers for this purpose is one of the key features that distinguishes the Watt steam engine of 1765 from the Newcomen steam engine of 1712.

No ambiguity arises in the case of a steam locomotive, as in a condensing steam locomotive the condenser is not there to increase efficiency, and may even reduce efficiency to conserve water and reduce emissions. So for example the Metropolitan Railway A Class is in every sense a simple locomotive despite its condensers, and the term simple engine applied to steam locomotives always in practice means one that does not use compounding, again irrespective of its use of condensers. The terms simple expansion locomotive and simple expansion engine are sometimes applied to locomotives to remove any possible confusion.

== History ==
=== Steam ===
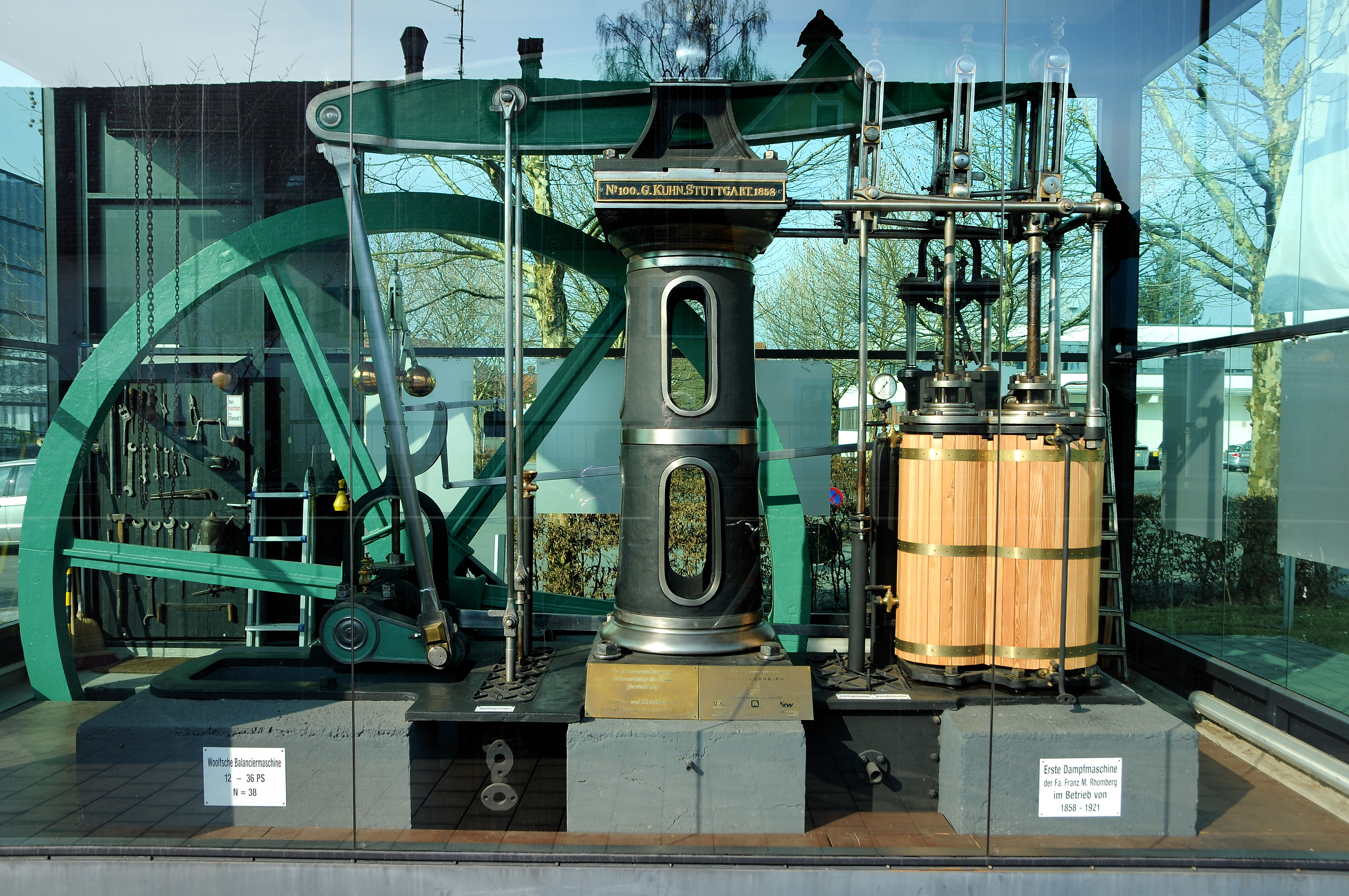
Woolf compound beam engine, 1858, with the light-coloured high- and low-pressure cylinders clearly visible

The oldest examples of compound engines are compound steam engines. In 1805 Arthur Woolf patented the Woolf high pressure compound engine which used this principle.

Compounding was particularly used on stationary steam engines, marine steam engines, and on some steam locomotives starting from the 1850s, largely in continental Europe.

Three-stage or triple expansion reciprocating steam engines, with three cylinders of increasing bore in line, were quite popular for steamship propulsion. "Doctor" Alexander Carnegie Kirk, experimentally fitted his first triple expansion engine to a ship called Propontis in 1874. In 1881, Kirk installed a refined version of his engine in SS Aberdeen on Clydeside, Scotland. This ship proved the advantages of power and economy of the new engine, in commercial service between the United Kingdom and the Far East. The first warship to be so equipped was the Spanish warship Destructor, which was also built on Clydeside, and the first engine of this type used in ships of the Royal Navy was designed by J. W. Reed, who also created the Reed water tube boiler. Other navies and commercial shipowners soon followed. Four-stage, or quadruple, expansion engines were also used.

Several classes of steam locomotive have existed in both simple and compound form, most commonly when locomotives originally built as compound were converted to simple to gain power at the expense of efficiency, for example the majority of the NZR X class. Other conversions involved redesigning the details of the compounding; for example, many compound locomotives designed by Alfred de Glehn and state of the art in their day were modified by André Chapelon to use his later scheme.

=== Internal combustion ===
Some compound internal combustion engines have been patented, but these have not met with much commercial success. These engines use a three-cylinder arrangement with alternating high-pressure cylinders that exhaust into a central low-pressure cylinder.

Examples include: Deutz 1879, Forest-Gallice 1888, Connelly 1888, Diesel 1897, Bales 1897, Babled 1903, Butler 1904, Eisenhuth 1904–7, Abbot 1910. The concept was "re-invented" and patented as the five-stroke engine in 2000 by Gerhard Schmitz, which was experimented with by Ilmor.

Turbo-compounding has been applied to internal combustion engines. Turbo compound engines were extensively used as aircraft engines immediately after the Second World War.

Diesel turbo compound engines remain in use in trucks and agricultural machinery.

== Examples ==
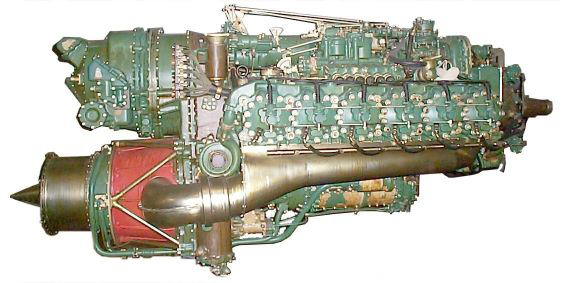
Napier Nomad turbo-compound aircraft engine, showing the turbine below. Modern compound truck and machinery engines use a similar configuration.

- Turbo-compound engines
  - Truck and machinery engines
  - Aircraft engines
    - Napier Nomad
    - Wright R-3350 Duplex-Cyclone, which was produced in both simple and compound versions and, in compound configuration, powered many post-World War II aircraft, including the Lockheed Constellation. It was notable for adding recovered exhaust power directly to the crankshaft without imposing back pressure on the cylinders.
    - Dobrynin VD-4K aircraft engine
- Compound steam engines
  - Compound locomotives (see also Category:Compound locomotives)
    - LMS Compound 4-4-0
    - NZR A class (1906)
    - LMS 6399 Fury
    - Württemberg Tssd
    - Bavarian S 3/6
    - Some Mallet locomotives, particularly the original designs
    - Nilgiri Mountain Railway X class
  - Cross-compound steam-driven air compressor, e.g. Westinghouse 8 1/2" 150-D, used on many large American locomotives
  - Many traction engines
  - Most reciprocating marine steam engines
    - Two triple-expansion steam engines were fitted to each of the three Olympic-class ocean liners including RMS Titanic (1912), driving the wing propellers. These engines were typical of the era. In the Olympic class, further compounding was achieved by using the exhaust steam from these engines to drive a low-pressure steam turbine driving a smaller central propeller. This scheme had been pioneered by SS Laurentic (1908).
Compound steam engines
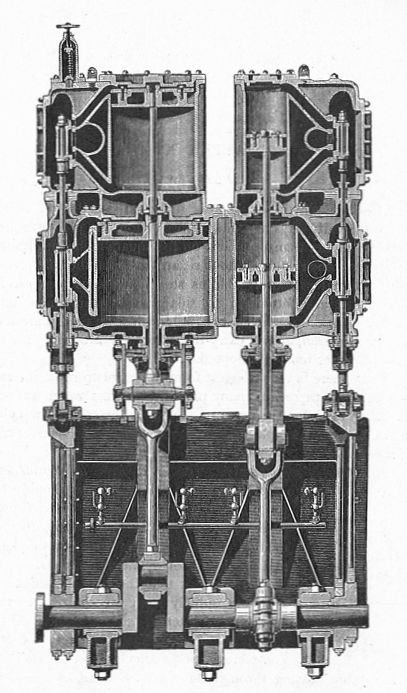
Cutaway diagram of a quadruple-expansion steam engine, showing four double-acting cylinders of increasing size

Diagram showing the operation of a triple-expansion marine engine

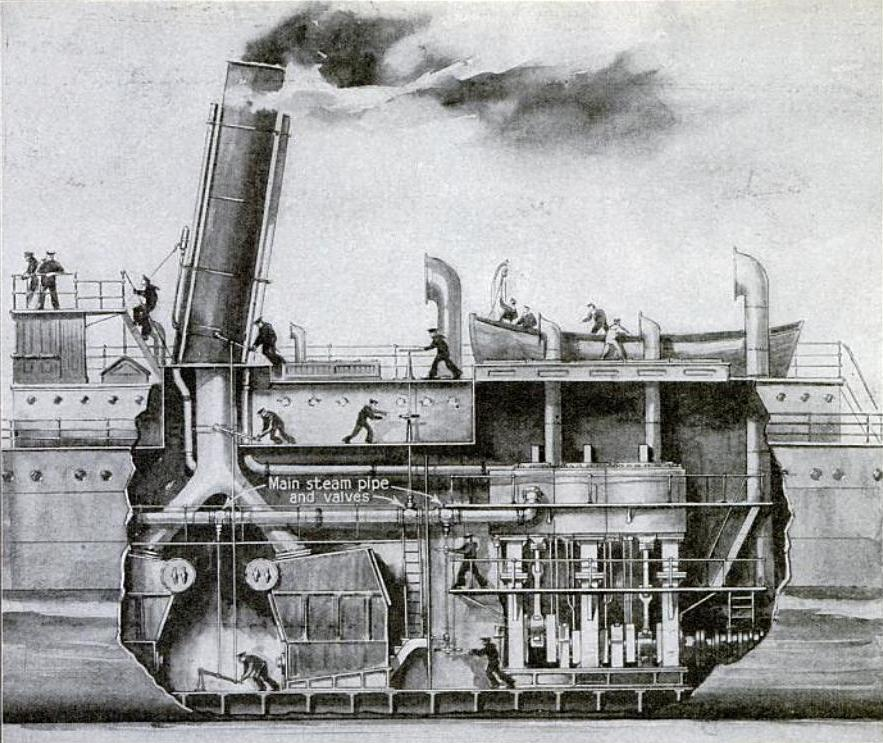
Cut away diagram of a triple expansion marine steam engine installation, circa 1918

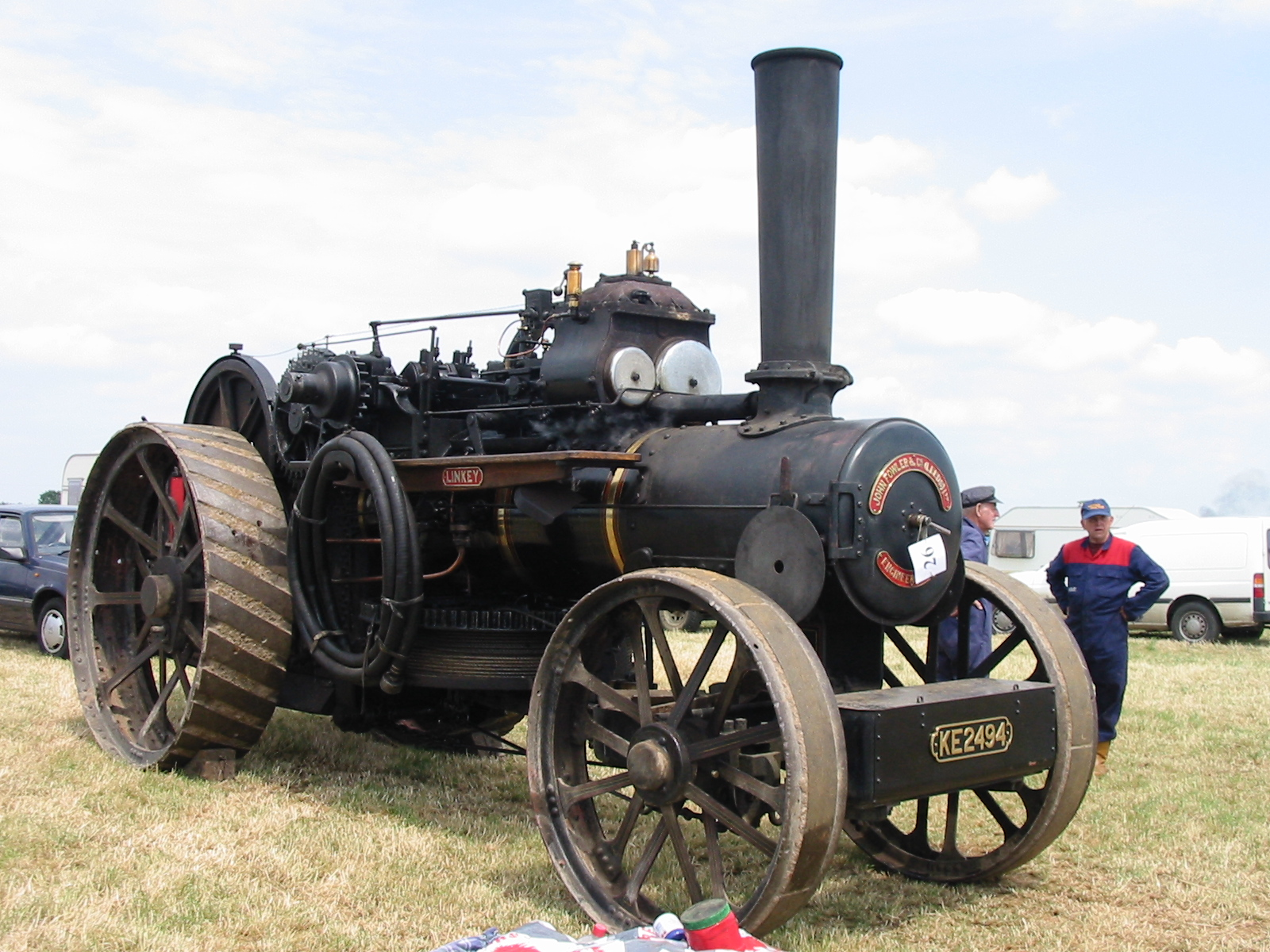
Compound traction engine with a single high-pressure cylinder and a larger low-pressure cylinder side by side on top of the boiler. This was a common configuration.
- Rolls Royce R6 compound Wankel engine

== See also ==
=== Theory ===
- Steam engine § Engine cycles
- Marine steam engine § Engines classified by cylinder technology

=== Inventors and designers ===
- Arthur Woolf
- Anatole Mallet
- Alfred de Glehn
- Joseph Anton Maffei
- Gaston du Bousquet
- André Chapelon

=== Similar technology ===
- Compound turbine
- Compounding of steam turbines
- Pressure compounding in turbines
