= Energy industry =

Production and sale of energy

The energy industry refers to all of the industries involved in the production and sale of energy, including fuel extraction, manufacturing, refining and distribution. Modern society consumes large amounts of fuel, and the energy industry is a crucial part of the infrastructure and maintenance of society in almost all countries.

In particular, the energy industry comprises:

- the fossil fuel industries, which include petroleum industries (oil companies, petroleum refiners, fuel transport and end-user sales at gas stations), coal industries (extraction and processing), and the natural gas industries (natural gas extraction, and coal gas manufacture, as well as distribution and sales);
- the electrical power industry, including electricity generation, electric power distribution, and sales;
- the nuclear power industry;
- the renewable energy industry, comprising alternative energy and sustainable energy companies, including those involved in hydroelectric power, wind power, and solar power generation, and the manufacture, distribution and sale of alternative fuels; and,
- traditional energy industry based on the collection and distribution of firewood, the use of which, for cooking and heating, is particularly common in poorer countries.

The increased dependence during the 20th century on carbon-emitting energy sources, such as fossil fuels, and carbon-emitting renewables, such as biomass, means that the energy industry has frequently contributed to pollution and environmental impacts on the economy. Until recently, fossil fuels were the primary source of energy generation in most parts of the world and are a significant contributor to global warming and pollution. Many economies are investing in renewable and sustainable energy to limit global warming and reduce air pollution.

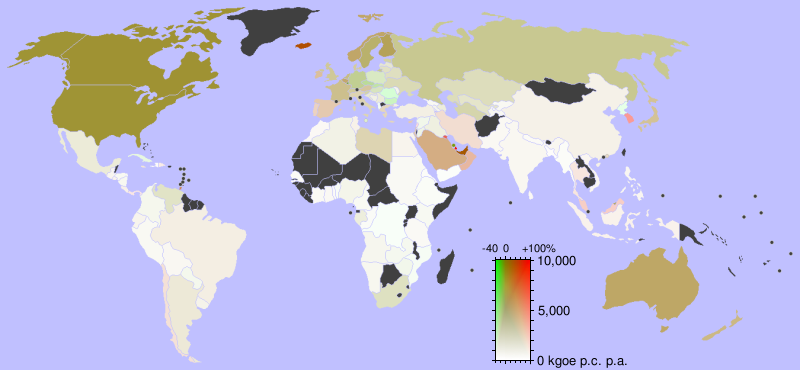
Energy consumption in kilograms of oil equivalent (kgoe) per person per year per country (2001 data). Darker tones indicate larger consumption, while dark grey areas are missing from the dataset. Red hue indicates increasing consumption, green hue indicates decreasing consumption, in the time between 1990 and 2001.

== History ==
The use of energy has been a key in the development of human societies by helping it to control and adapt to the environment. Managing the use of energy is inevitable in any functional society. In the industrialized world the development of energy resources has become essential for agriculture, transportation, waste collection, information technology, communications that have become prerequisites of a developed society. The increasing use of energy since the Industrial Revolution has also brought with it a number of serious problems, some of which, such as global warming, present potentially grave risks to the world.

In some industries, the word energy is used as a synonym for energy resources, which refer to substances like fuels, petroleum products, and electricity in general. This is because a significant portion of the energy contained in these resources can easily be extracted to serve a useful purpose. After a useful process has taken place, the total energy is conserved. Still, the resource itself is not conserved since a process usually transforms the energy into unusable forms (such as unnecessary or excess heat).

Ever since humanity discovered various energy resources available in nature, it has been inventing devices, known as machines, that make life more comfortable by using energy resources. Thus, although primitive man knew the utility of fire to cook food, the invention of devices like gas burners and microwave ovens led to additional ways of how energy can be used. The trend is the same in any other field of social activity, be it the construction of social infrastructure, manufacturing of fabrics for covering, porting, printing, decorating, for example, textiles, air conditioning, communication of information, or for moving people and goods (automobiles).

== Economics ==
Production and consumption of energy resources is very important to the global economy. All economic activity requires energy resources, whether to manufacture goods, provide transportation, run computers and other machines.

Widespread demand for energy may encourage competing energy utilities and the formation of retail energy markets. Note the presence of the "Energy Marketing and Customer Service" (EMACS) sub-sector.

The energy sector accounts for 4.6% of outstanding leveraged loans, compared with 3.1% a decade ago, while energy bonds make up 15.7% of the $1.3 trillion junk bond market, up from 4.3% over the same period.

== Management ==
Since the cost of energy has become a significant factor in the performance of societies' economies, the management of energy resources has become crucial. Energy management involves using the available energy resources more effectively, that is, with minimum incremental costs. Simple management techniques can often save energy expenditures without incorporating fresh technology. Energy management is most often the practice of using energy more efficiently by eliminating energy wastage or balancing justifiable energy demand with appropriate energy supply. The process couples energy awareness with energy conservation.

== Classifications ==
=== Government ===
The United Nations developed the International Standard Industrial Classification, which is a list of economic and social classifications. There is no distinct classification for an energy industry, because the classification system is based on activities, products, and expenditures according to purpose.

Countries in North America use the North American Industry Classification System (NAICS). The NAICS sectors No. 21 and No. 22 (mining and utilities) might roughly define the energy industry in North America. This classification is used by the U.S. Securities and Exchange Commission.

=== Financial market ===
The Global Industry Classification Standard used by Morgan Stanley define the energy industry as comprising companies primarily working with oil, gas, coal and consumable fuels, excluding companies working with certain industrial gases. Add also to expand this section: Dow Jones Industrial Average

== Environmental impact ==
Government encouragement in the form of subsidies and tax incentives for energy-conservation efforts has increasingly fostered the view of conservation as a major function of the energy industry: saving an amount of energy provides economic benefits almost identical to generating that same amount of energy. This is compounded by the fact that the economics of delivering energy tend to be priced for capacity as opposed to average usage. One of the purposes of a smart grid infrastructure is to smooth out demand so that capacity and demand curves align more closely. Some parts of the energy industry generate considerable pollution, including toxic and greenhouse gases from fuel combustion, nuclear waste from the generation of nuclear power, and oil spillages as a result of petroleum extraction. Government regulations to internalize these externalities form an increasing part of doing business, and the trading of carbon credits and pollution credits on the free market may also result in energy-saving and pollution-control measures becoming even more important to energy providers.

Consumption of energy resources, (e.g. turning on a light) requires resources and has an effect on the environment. Many electric power plants burn coal, oil or natural gas to generate electricity for energy needs. While burning these fossil fuels produces a readily available and instantaneous supply of electricity, it also generates air pollutants including carbon dioxide (CO_{2}), sulfur dioxide and trioxide (SOx) and nitrogen oxides (NOx). Carbon dioxide is an important greenhouse gas, known to be responsible, along with methane, nitrous oxide, and fluorinated gases, for the rapid increase in global warming since the Industrial Revolution. In the 20th century, global temperature records are significantly higher than temperature records from thousands of years ago, taken from ice cores in Arctic regions. Burning fossil fuels for electricity generation also releases trace metals such as beryllium, cadmium, chromium, copper, manganese, mercury, nickel, and silver into the environment, which also act as pollutants.

The large-scale use of renewable energy technologies would "greatly mitigate or eliminate a wide range of environmental and human health impacts of energy use". Renewable energy technologies include biofuels, solar heating and cooling, hydroelectric power, solar power, and wind power. Energy conservation and the efficient use of energy would also help.

In addition it is argued that there is also the potential to develop a more efficient energy sector. This can be done by:

- Fuel switching in the power sector from coal to natural gas;
- Power plant optimisation and other measures to improve the efficiency of existing CCGT power plants;
- Combined heat and power (CHP), from micro-scale residential to large-scale industrial;
- Waste heat recovery

Best available technology (BAT) offers supply-side efficiency levels far higher than global averages. The relative benefits of gas compared to coal are influenced by the development of increasingly efficient energy production methods. According to an impact assessment carried out for the European Commission, the levels of energy efficiency of coal-fired plants built have now increased to 46–49% efficiency rates, as compared to coals plants built before the 1990s (32–40%). However, at the same time gas can reach 58–59% efficiency levels with the best available technology. Meanwhile, combined heat and power can offer efficiency rates of 80–90%.

== Politics ==
Since energy now plays an essential role in industrial societies, the ownership and control of energy resources plays an increasing role in politics. At the national level, governments seek to influence the sharing (distribution) of energy resources among various sections of the society through pricing mechanisms; or even who owns resources within their borders. They may also seek to influence the use of energy by individuals and business in an attempt to tackle environmental issues.

The most recent international political controversy regarding energy resources is in the context of the Iraq Wars. Some political analysts maintain that the hidden reason for both 1991 and 2003 wars can be traced to strategic control of international energy resources. Others counter this analysis with the numbers related to its economics. According to the latter group of analysts, U.S. has spent about $336 billion in Iraq as compared with a background current value of $25 billion per year budget for the entire U.S. oil import dependence

=== Policy ===
Energy policy is the manner in which a given entity (often governmental) has decided to address issues of energy development, including energy production, distribution and consumption. The attributes of energy policy may include legislation, international treaties, incentives to investment, guidelines for energy conservation, taxation and other public policy techniques.

=== Security ===
Energy security is the intersection of national security and the availability of natural resources for energy consumption. Access to cheap energy has become essential to the functioning of modern economies. However, the uneven distribution of energy supplies among countries has led to significant vulnerabilities. Threats to energy security include the political instability of several energy producing countries, the manipulation of energy supplies, the competition over energy sources, attacks on supply infrastructure, as well as accidents, natural disasters, the funding to foreign dictators, rising terrorism, and dominant countries reliance to the foreign oil supply. The limited supplies, uneven distribution, and rising costs of fossil fuels, such as oil and gas, create a need to change to more sustainable energy sources in the foreseeable future. With as much dependence that the U.S. currently has for oil and with the peaking limits of oil production; economies and societies will begin to feel the decline in the resource that we have become dependent upon. Energy security has become one of the leading issues in the world today as oil and other resources have become as vital to the world's people. But with oil production rates decreasing and oil production peak nearing, the world has come to protect what resources we have left. With new advancements in renewable resources, less pressure has been put on companies that produce the world's oil; these resources are geothermal, solar power, wind power, and hydroelectric. Although these are not all the current and possible options for the world to turn to as the oil depletes, the most critical issue is protecting these vital resources from future threats. These new resources will become more valuable as the price of exporting and importing oil will increase due to increased demand.

== Development ==
Producing energy to sustain human needs is an essential social activity, and a great deal of effort goes into the activity. While most of such effort is limited towards increasing the production of electricity and oil, newer ways of producing usable energy resources from the available energy resources are being explored. One such effort is to explore means of producing hydrogen fuel from water. Though hydrogen use is environmentally friendly, its production requires energy and existing technologies to make it, are not very efficient. Research is underway to explore enzymatic decomposition of biomass.

Other forms of conventional energy resources are also being used in new ways. Coal gasification and liquefaction are recent technologies that are becoming attractive after the realization that oil reserves, at present consumption rates, may be rather short lived. See alternative fuels.

Energy is the subject of significant research activities globally. For example, the UK Energy Research Centre is the focal point for UK energy research while the European Union has many technology programmes as well as a platform for engaging social science and humanities within energy research.

== Transportation ==
All societies require materials and food to be transported over distances, generally against some force of friction. Since application of force over distance requires the presence of a source of usable energy, such sources are of great worth in society.

While energy resources are an essential ingredient for all modes of transportation in society, the transportation of energy resources is becoming equally important. Energy resources are frequently located far from the place where they are consumed. Therefore, their transportation is always in question. Some energy resources like liquid or gaseous fuels are transported using tankers or pipelines, while electricity transportation invariably requires a network of grid cables. The transportation of energy, whether by tanker, pipeline, or transmission line, poses challenges for scientists and engineers, policy makers, and economists to make it more risk-free and efficient.

== Crisis ==
Oil prices from 1861 to 2007

Economic and political instability can lead to an energy crisis. Notable oil crises are the 1973 oil crisis and the 1979 oil crisis. The advent of peak oil, the point in time when the maximum rate of global petroleum extraction is reached, will likely precipitate another energy crisis.

== Mergers and acquisitions ==
Between 1985 and 2018 there had been around 69,932 deals in the energy sector. This cumulates to an overall value of US$9,578bn. The most active year was 2010 with about 3.761 deals. In terms of value 2007 was the strongest year (US$684bn), which was followed by a steep decline until 2009 (−55.8%).

Here is a list of the top 10 deals in history in the energy sector:

Date Announced	Acquiror Name	Acquiror Mid Industry	Acquiror Nation	Target Name	Target Mid Industry	Target Nation	Value of Transaction ($mil)
12/01/1998	Exxon Corp	Oil & Gas	United States	Mobil Corp	Oil & Gas	United States	78,945.79
10/28/2004	Royal Dutch Petroleum Co	Oil & Gas	Netherlands	Shell Transport & Trading Co	Oil & Gas	United Kingdom	74,558.58
04/08/2015	Royal Dutch Shell PLC	Petrochemicals	Netherlands	BG Group PLC	Oil & Gas	United Kingdom	69,445.02
02/25/2006	Gaz de France SA	Oil & Gas	France	Suez SA	Power	France	60,856.45
07/05/1999	Total Fina SA	Oil & Gas	France	Elf Aquitaine	Oil & Gas	France	50,070.05
08/11/1998	British Petroleum Co PLC	Oil & Gas	United Kingdom	Amoco Corp	Oil & Gas	United States	48,174.09
09/01/2010	Petrobras	Oil & Gas	Brazil	Brazil-Oil & Gas Blocks	Oil & Gas	Brazil	42,877.03
10/16/2000	Chevron Corp	Petrochemicals	United States	Texaco Inc	Petrochemicals	United States	42,872.30
06/20/2000	Vivendi SA	Water and Waste Management	France	Seagram Co Ltd	Motion Pictures / Audio Visual	Canada	40,428.19
12/14/2009	Exxon Mobil Corp	Petrochemicals	United States	XTO Energy Inc	Oil & Gas	United States	40,298.14

== See also ==
- Climate lawsuit
- Energy accounting
- Energy quality
- Energy system – the interpretation of the energy sector in system terms
- Energy transformation
- Economics of climate change
- Hydrogen economy
- List of books about the energy industry
- List of countries by energy consumption per capita
- List of energy resources
- List of largest energy companies
- Renewable energy
- Stranded asset
- World energy consumption
- Worldwide energy supply
