= Grodno Hydroelectric Power Station =

Dam in Grodno, Belarus

Grodno Dam
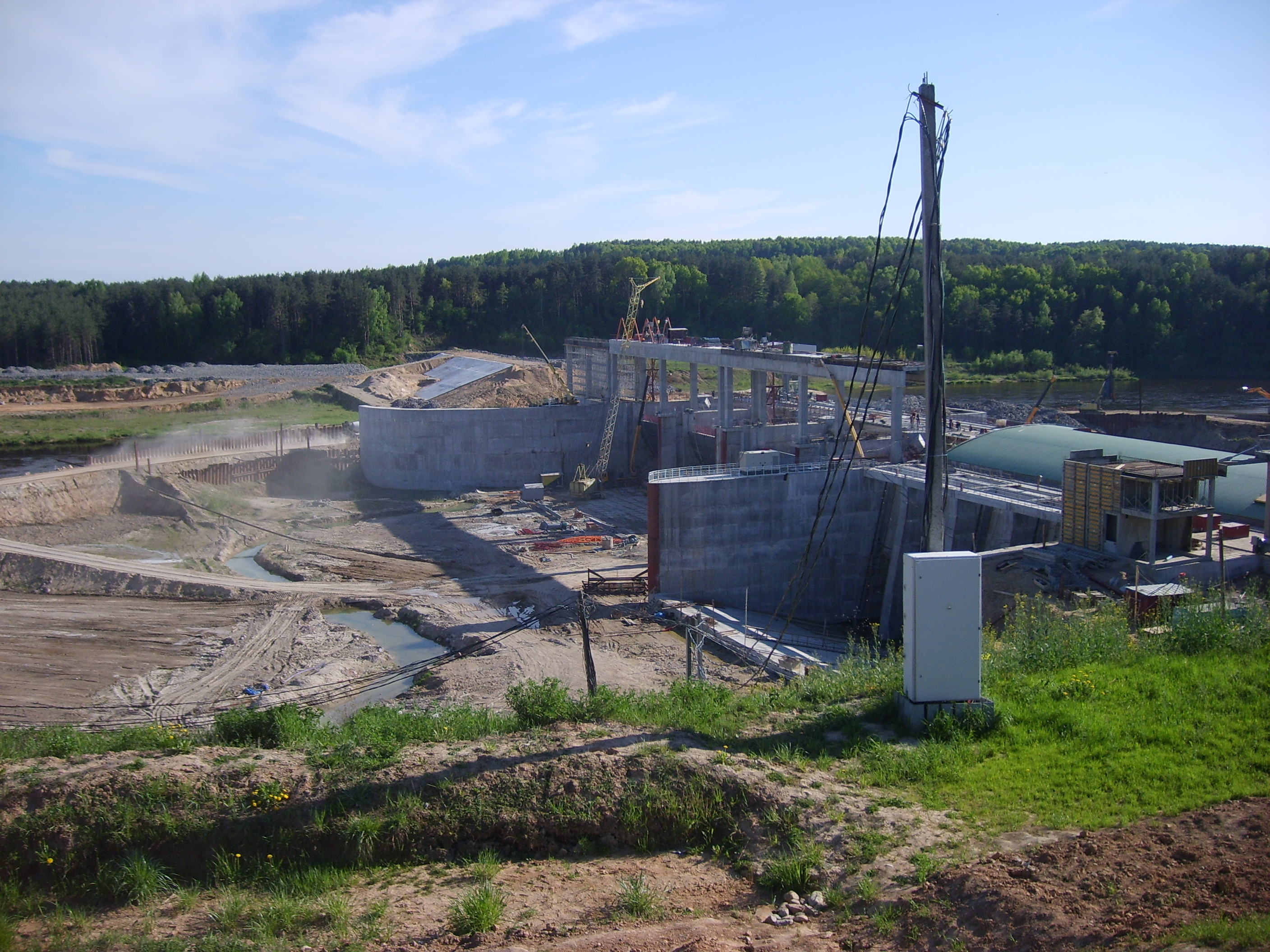
- The dam under construction in 2008

- Location within Belarus
- Country: Belarus
- Location: Grodno
- Coordinates: 53°38′38.87″N 23°58′24.55″E
- Purpose: Power
- Status: Operational
- Construction began: 2008
- Opening date: 2012
- Construction cost: US$118 million

Dam and spillways
- Type of dam: Embankment with gravity spillway and powerhouse section
- Impounds: Neman River
- Height: 17 m (56 ft)

Power Station
- Hydraulic head: 6.9 m (23 ft)
- Turbines: 5 x 3.4 MW Kaplan-type
- Installed capacity: 17 MW
- Annual generation: 84.4 GWh

Grodno Hydroelectric Power Station is a run-of-the-river hydroelectric power station on the Neman River, about 8 kilometres (5.0 mi) east of Grodno in Belarus. Construction on the 17 megawatts (23,000 hp) power station began in 2008 and it became operational on 1 September 2012. It is the largest hydroelectric power station in Belarus.
