= Wave Dragon =

Wave Dragon is a concept wave energy converter of the overtopping type, developed by the Danish company Wave Dragon Aps. Incoming waves flow up a ramp into a reservoir, the water the drains back to sea level though a hydro-electric turbine, generating electricity. "Reflector arms" are used to focus incoming waves, to channel the waves towards the ramp, increasing the energy captured.

In May 2003, it was the world's first offshore wave energy converter, connected to the Danish electricity grid. Testing continued in Denmark for several years until 2010. Plans were developed for a full-scale pre-commercial prototype in Wales, but this was never built.

Part of the development of Wave Dragon was a joint EU research project, including partners from Austria, Denmark, Germany, Ireland, Portugal, Sweden, and the UK.

== History ==
The concept was formulated in 1987, by Danish engineer Erik Friis-Madsen, and patented thereafter.

Between 1998 and 2001, prototype testing of the device was conducted at small-scale (1:50) in the Aalborg University wave tank, and at University College Cork.

In March 2003, a 1:4.5 scale, 237 ton prototype Wave Dragon was towed to the first test site, at the Danish Wave Energy Test Center in Nissum Bredning fjord. It was tested until January 2005, when during a storm the mooring broke and the device drifted onto the beach. The failure was caused by a faulty load transducer.

In April 2006, a modified prototype was deployed to another test site with more energetic wave climate. It was re-deployed again in 2009, with a rated power of 20 kW, and operated until problems with drifting ice halted testing in March 2010. The prototype was scrapped in 2011.

In 2004, plans were announced to build a series of wave power plants off the coast of Milford Haven, Wales. Wave Dragon had hoped to commercialise their technology in Denmark, but following the success of offshore wind power, the Danish government cut funding for other renewable technologies. An environmental impact assessment was completed in 2007 in support of the statutory consents for the "Wave Dragon Pre-Commercial Demonstrator". This project was for a 7 MW Wave Dragon moored off the Pembrokeshire coast in approximately 25 metres (82 ft) water depth, 1.7 kilometres (1.1 mi; 0.92 nmi) west of Long Point. However, the 2008 financial crisis caused delays in financing, and the project was not built.

As of 2022, Wave Dragon is seeking further funding to continue development of the concept.

== Technology ==
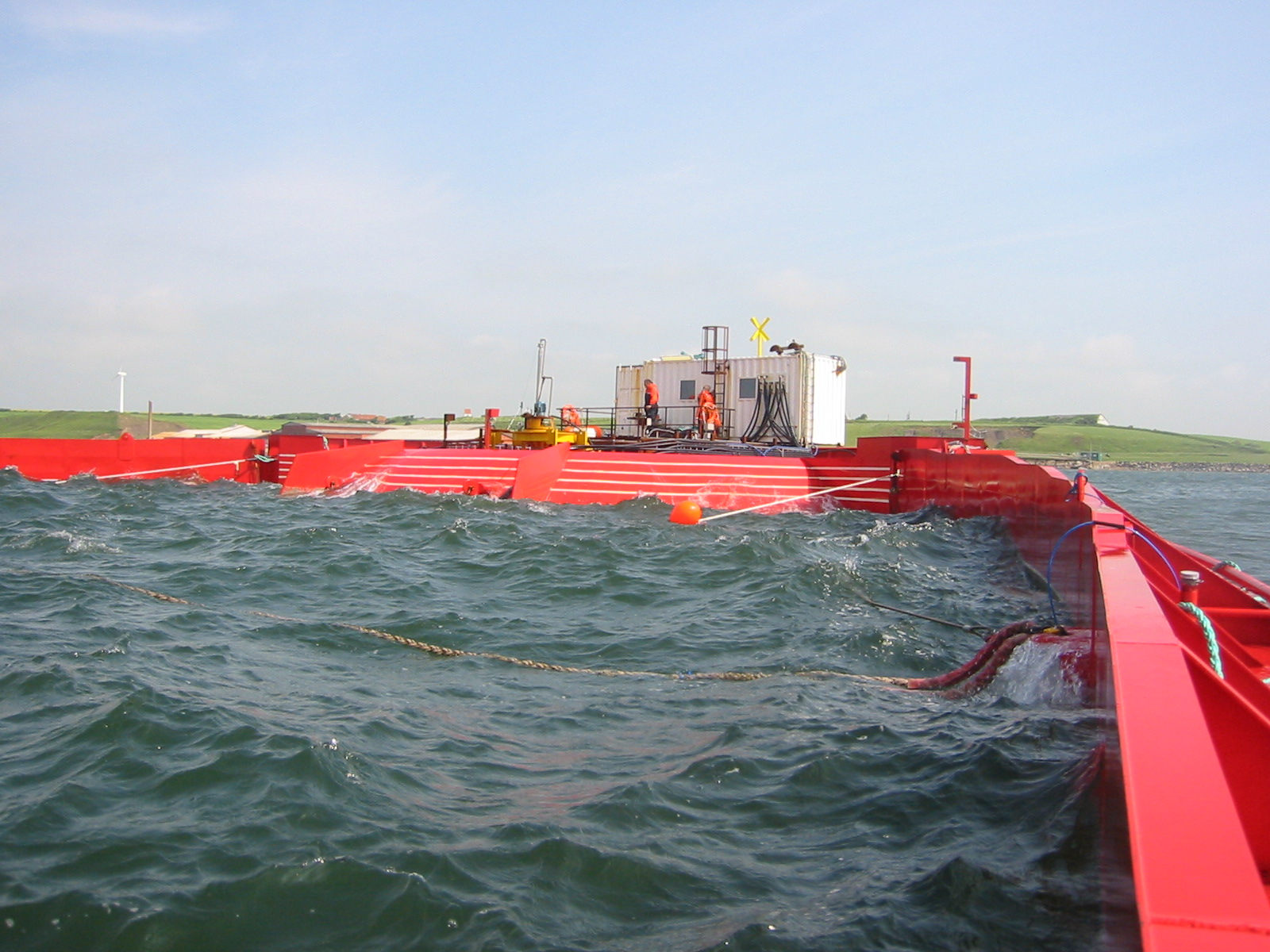
Wave Dragon seen from reflector, prototype 1:4½

Wave Dragon is a floating, slack-moored device, like a ship. As a wave energy converter, it functions as an 'overtopping' type which can be deployed as a single unit, or in arrays of up to 200 units; the output of such an array would have a capacity comparable to traditional fossil-fuel power plants.

The first prototype was connected to the power grid in 2003 and was deployed in Nissum Bredning, Denmark. Long term testing was conducted until 2010 to determine system performance; i.e. availability and power production under different weather and tide conditions. A multi-MW deployment was expected in 2009.

The Wave Dragon concept combines existing, mature offshore and hydro turbine technology. In the Wave Dragon, the Kaplan turbine is being tested at the Technical University of Munich. This turbine uses a siphon inlet whereas the next 6 turbines to be installed will be equipped with a cylinder gate to start and stop water inlet to the turbine.

== Principles ==
=== Construction ===
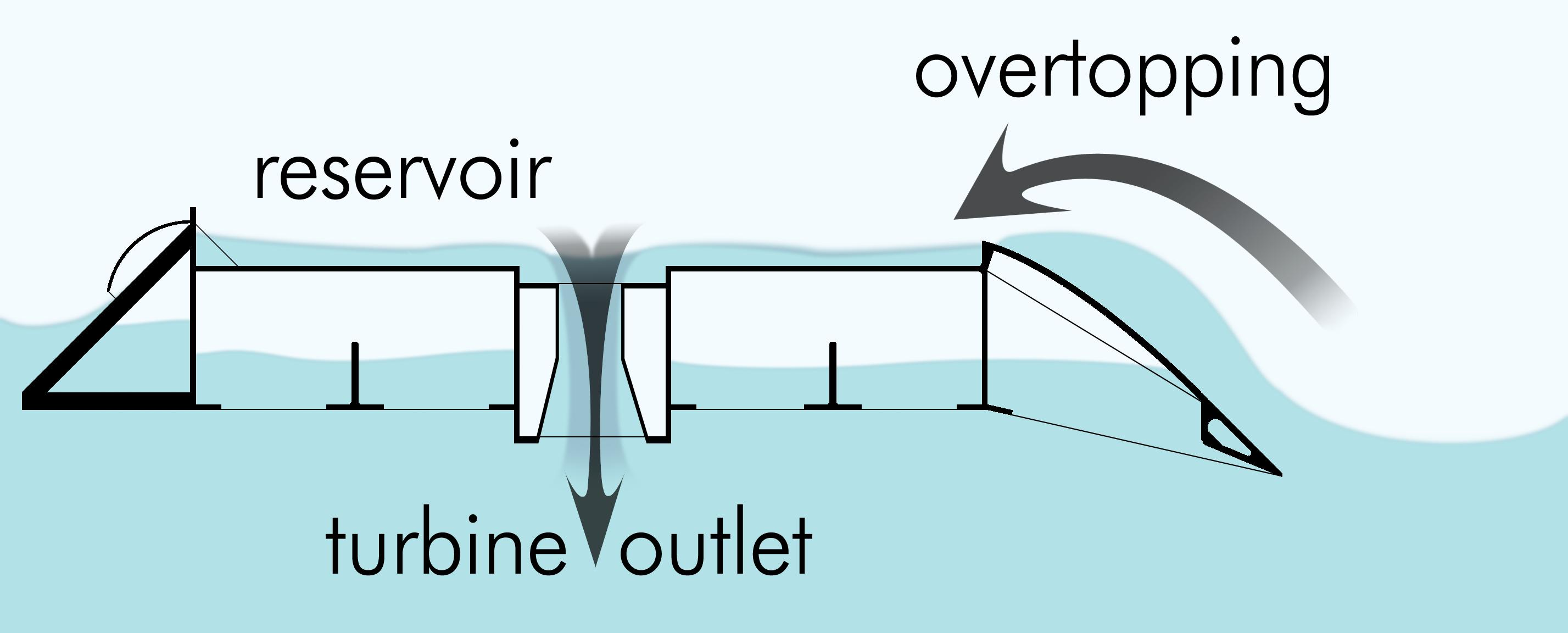
Over topping principle of Wave Dragon

Wave Dragon uses principles from traditional hydropower plants in an offshore floating platform to use wave energy.

The Wave Dragon consists of two wave reflectors that direct the waves towards a ramp. Behind the ramp, a large reservoir collects the directed water, and temporarily stores the water. The reservoir is held above sea level. The water leaves the reservoir through hydro turbines.

Three-step energy conversion:

Overtopping (absorption) -> Storage (reservoir) -> Power-take-off (low-head turbines)

Main components of a Wave Dragon:

- Main body with a double curved ramp (reinforced concrete and/or steel construction)
- Two wave reflectors in reinforced concrete and/or steel
- Mooring system
- Propeller turbines
- Permanent Magnet Generators

=== Design ===
Wave energy converters make use of the mechanical motion or fluid pressure. Wave Dragon does not have any conversion, e.g. oscillating water/air columns, hinged rafts, and gyroscopic/hydraulic devices. The Wave Dragon directly utilises the energy of the water's motion.

The Wave Dragon is of heavy, durable construction and has only one kind of moving parts: the turbines. This is essential for any device bound for operations offshore, where extreme conditions and fouling, etc., seriously affect any moving parts.

Wave Dragon model testing has been used in order to:

- Optimize 'overtopping'
- Refine hydraulic response: anti-pitching and anti-rolling.
- Reduce stress on wave reflectors and the mooring system, etc.
- Reduce construction costs, maintenance and running costs.

==== Main body ====
The main body to or platform consists of one large floating reservoir. To reduce rolling and keep the platform stable, the Wave Dragon must be large and heavy. The prototype used in Nissum is of a traditional (ship-like) plate construction of plates of 8 mm steel. The total steel weight of the main body plus the ramp is 150 tons, so that 87 tons of water must be added to achieve the 237 tons total weight needed for stable continuous operation.

== See also ==
- Wave power
