= List of largest energy companies =

As of March 28, 2026, the following is a list of public energy companies ranked by market capitalization.

The list is expressed in USD, using exchange rates from the selected day to convert other currencies.

Rank	Company	Country	Market capitalization	Revenue	Total assets	Total equity	Employees
1	Saudi Aramco	(Saudi Arabia)	$1.741 trillion	$480.44 billion (2024)	$646.3 billion (2024)	$440.36 billion (2024)	75,118
2	ExxonMobil	(United States)	$712.475 billion	$349.6 billion (2024)	$453.5 billion (2024)	$263.7 billion (2024)	60,900
3	Chevron Corporation	(United States)	$422.164 billion	$202.7 billion (2024)	$256.9 billion (2024)	$152.3 billion (2024)	45,298
4	PetroChina	(China)	$319.589 billion	$402.5 billion (2024)	$377.12 billion (2024)	$234.21 billion (2024)	370,799
5	Shell plc	(United Kingdom)	$260.494 billion	$266.9 billion (2025)	$370.4 billion (2025)	$175.3 billion (2025)	96,000
6	GE Vernova	(United States)	$231.48 billion	$38.07 billion (2025)	$63.02 billion (2025)	$11.18 billion (2025)	70,000
7	TotalEnergies	(France)	$193.963 billion	$237.1 billion (2023)	$283.6 billion (2023)	$119.4 billion (2023)	102,887
8	NextEra Energy	(United States)	$190.434 billion	$24.8 billion (2024)	$190.1 billion (2024)	$60.5 billion (2024)	370,799
9	ConocoPhillips	(United States)	$163.549 billion	$56.95 billion (2024)	$122.8 billion (2024)	$64.8 billion (2024)	11,800
10	Iberdrola	(Spain)	$148.985 billion	$46.55 billion (2024)	$164.39 billion (2024)	-	42,200
11	China Shenhua Energy	(China)	$145.978 billion	$46.357 billion (2024)	-	-	83,351
12	Siemens Energy	(Germany)	$142.378 billion	$46.2 billion (2025)	$52.93 billion (2024)	-	102,000
13	Petrobras	(Brazil)	$133.849 billion	$124.47 billion (2022)	$174.3 billion (2021)	$69.8 billion (2021)	45,532
14	BP	(United Kingdom)	$119.578 billion	$189.33 billion (2025)	$278.52 billion (2025)	$74 billion (2025)	100,500
15	Enbridge	(Canada)	$119.124 billion	$32.942 billion (2023)	$136.085 billion (2023)	$46.379 billion (2023)	13,400
16	Constellation Energy	(United States)	$109.228 billion	$25.5 billion (2025)	$57.2 billion (2025)	$14.5 billion (2025)	15,339
17	Southern Company	(United States)	$106.958 billion	$26.72 billion (2024)	$145.18 billion (2024)	$36.67 billion (2024)	28,600
18	Enel	(Italy)	$105.219 billion	$82.151 billion (2024)	$194.734 billion (2024)	$51.166 billion (2024)	60,359
19	Canadian Natural Resources	(Canada)	$104.742 billion	$17.491 billion (2020)	$75.276 billion (2020)	$37.458 billion (2020)	9,709
20	Equinor	(Norway)	$103.517 billion	$102.5 billion (2024)	$131.1 billion (2024)	$42.34 billion (2024)	25,155

== See also ==
- Energy industry
- List of countries by energy consumption per capita
