= Pressure compounding in turbines =

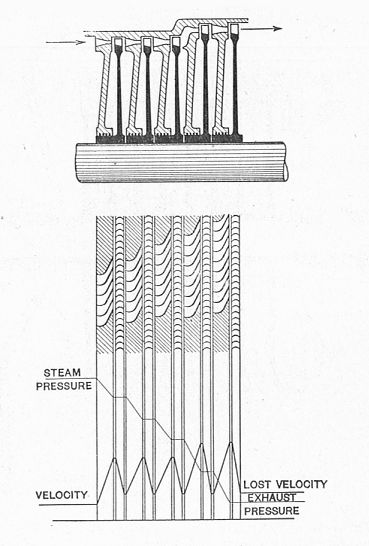
Diagram of a Rateau turbine

Pressure compounding is the method in which pressure in a steam turbine is made to drop in a number of stages rather than in a single nozzle. This method of compounding is used in Rateau and Zoelly turbines.

== Construction ==
The arrangement consists of a number of simple impulse turbines in series mounted on a common shaft. The exit steam from one turbine is made to enter the nozzle of the succeeding turbine. Each of the simple impulse turbines would then be termed a "stage" of the turbine. Each stage comprises its ring of nozzle and blades. The steam from the boiler passes through the first nozzle ring, where its pressure drops and velocity increases. The high-velocity jet steam is directed onto the first moving blades, wherein nearly all of its velocity is absorbed. The steam pressure remains unaltered. The steam from the first ring of moving blades enters the second ring of nozzles where its pressure is further reduced and velocity increased again. The next ring of moving blades absorbs the velocity obtained from this second ring nozzle. The process is repeated in the remaining rings until the whole of the pressure has been absorbed.

== Effect ==
The total pressure drop of the steam does not take place in the first nozzle, but is split equally between all the nozzle rings in the arrangement. The effect of absorbing the pressure drop in stages is to reduce the velocity of the steam entering the moving blades.

== See also ==
- Compound turbine
- Impulse turbine
- Steam turbine
- Compounding of steam turbines
