= Hygroelectricity =

Type of static electricity

Hygroelectricity is a type of static electricity that forms on water droplets and can be transferred from droplets to small dust particles. The phenomenon is common in the Earth's atmosphere but has also been observed in the steam escaping from boilers (see Armstrong effect). It was the basis for a proposal by Nikola Tesla to tap electricity from the air, an idea which has been recently revived. Hygroelectric charge is the likely source of the electric charge which, under certain conditions such as exist in thunderstorms, volcanic eruptions and some dust storms, gives rise to lightning.

As of 2023, a team at the Lisbon-based Catcher Project have generated a 1.5 V 10 mA current using a 4 cm-diameter device.
