= Kaplan turbine =

Propeller-type water turbine which has adjustable blades

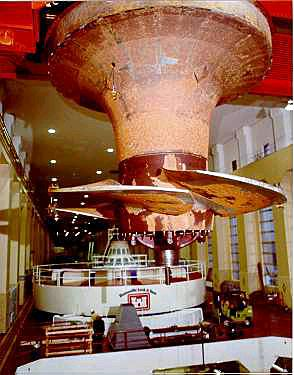
A Bonneville Dam Kaplan turbine after 61 years of service

The Kaplan turbine is a propeller-type water turbine which has adjustable blades. It was developed in 1913 by Austrian professor Viktor Kaplan, who combined automatically adjusted propeller blades with automatically adjusted wicket gates to achieve efficiency over a wide range of flow and water level.

The Kaplan turbine was an evolution of the Francis turbine. Its invention allowed efficient power production in low-head applications which was not possible with Francis turbines. The head ranges from 10 to 70 metres (33 to 230 ft) and the output ranges from 5 to 200 MW. Runner diameters are between 2 and 11 metres (6 ft 7 in and 36 ft 1 in). Turbines rotate at a constant rate, which varies from facility to facility. That rate ranges from as low as 54.5 rpm (Albeni Falls Dam) to 450 rpm.

Kaplan turbines are now widely used throughout the world in high-flow, low-head power production.

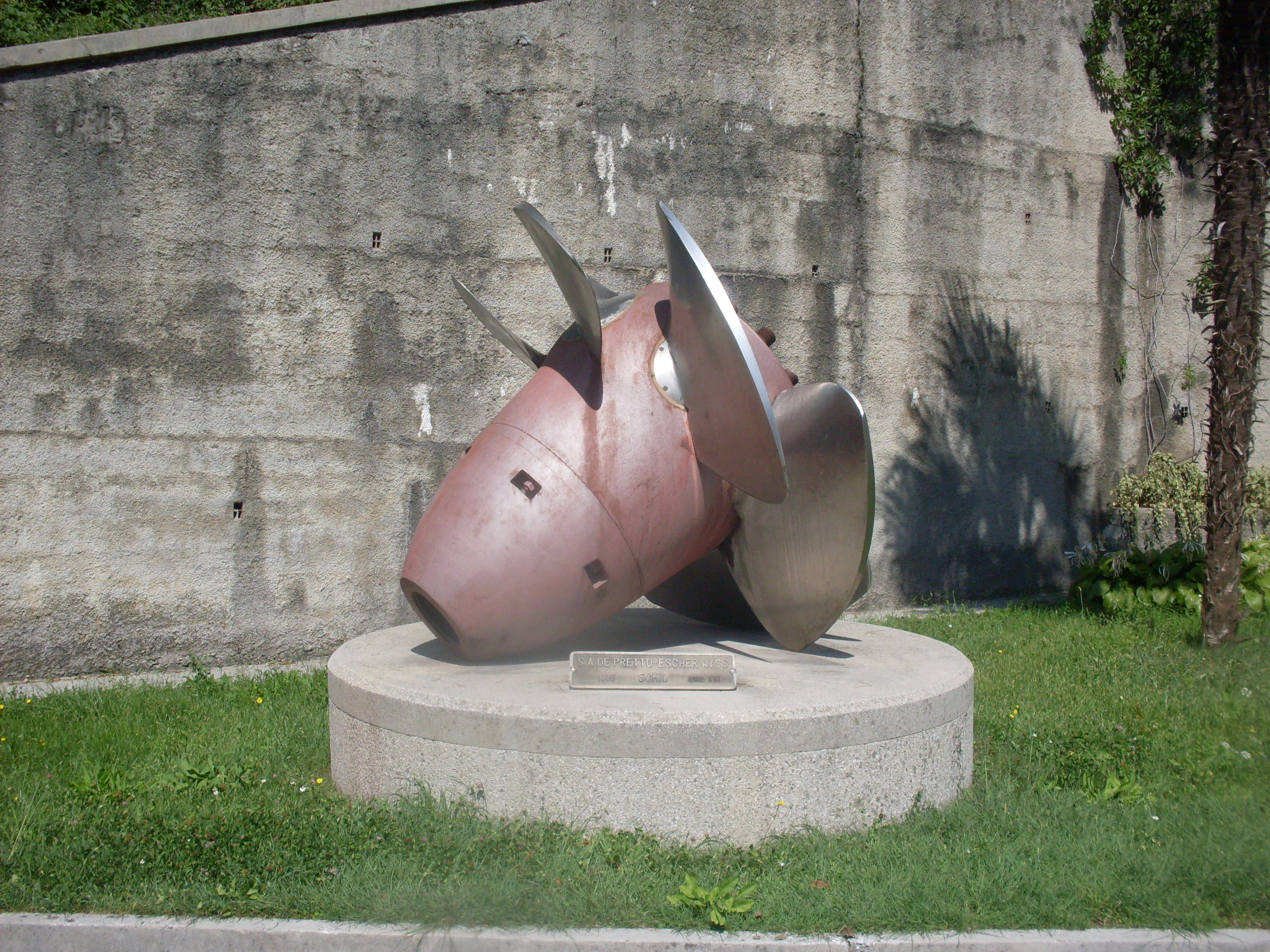
On this Kaplan runner the pivots at the base of the blade are visible; these allow the angle of the blades to be changed while running. The hub contains hydraulic cylinders for adjusting the angle.

== Development ==
Viktor Kaplan, living in Brno, Austria-Hungary (now in the Czech Republic), obtained his first patent for an adjustable blade propeller turbine in 1912. But the development of a commercially successful machine would take another decade. Kaplan struggled with cavitation problems, and in 1922 abandoned his research for health reasons.

In 1919, Kaplan installed a demonstration unit in Poděbrady (now in the Czech Republic). In 1922, Voith introduced an 1100 HP (about 800 kW) Kaplan turbine for use mainly on rivers. In 1924 an 8 MW unit went on line at Lilla Edet, Sweden. This launched the commercial success and widespread acceptance of Kaplan turbines.

== Theory of operation ==
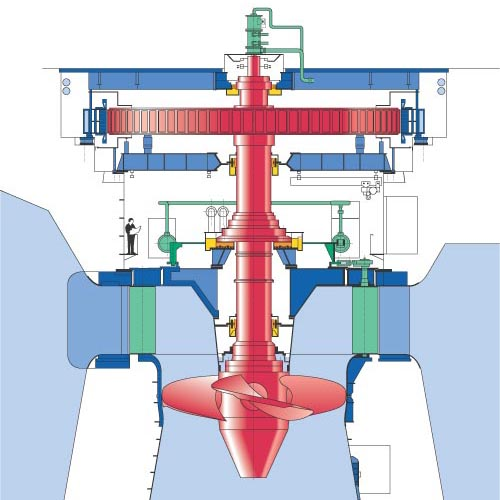
Vertical Kaplan Turbine (courtesy Voith-Siemens)

The Kaplan turbine is an inward flow reaction turbine, which means that the working fluid changes pressure as it moves through the turbine and gives up its energy. Power is recovered from both the hydrostatic head and from the kinetic energy of the flowing water. The design combines features of radial and axial turbines.

The inlet is a scroll-shaped tube that wraps around the turbine's wicket gate. Water is directed tangentially through the wicket gate and spirals on to a propeller shaped runner, causing it to spin.

The outlet is a specially shaped draft tube that helps decelerate the water and recover kinetic energy.

The turbine does not need to be at the lowest point of water flow as long as the draft tube remains full of water. A higher turbine location, however, increases the suction that is imparted on the turbine blades by the draft tube. The resulting pressure drop may lead to cavitation.

Variable geometry of the wicket gate and turbine blades allow efficient operation for a range of flow conditions. Kaplan turbine efficiencies are typically over 90%, but may be lower in very low head applications.

Current areas of research include computational fluid dynamics (CFD) driven efficiency improvements and new designs that raise survival rates of fish passing through.

Because the propeller blades are rotated on high-pressure hydraulic oil bearings, a critical element of Kaplan design is to maintain a positive seal to prevent emission of oil into the waterway. Discharge of oil into rivers is not desirable because of the waste of resources and resulting ecological damage.

== Applications ==
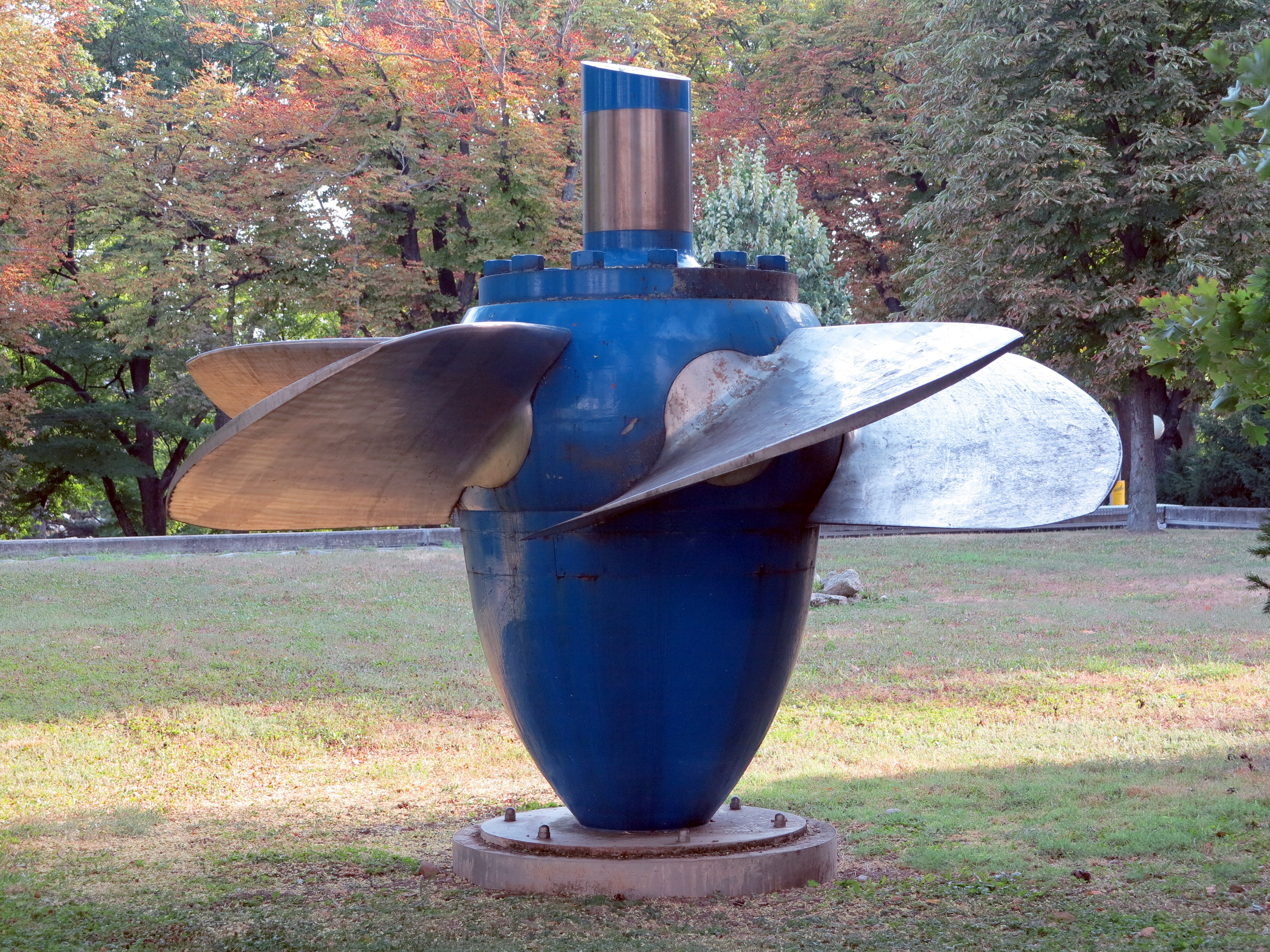
Viktor Kaplan Turbine, Technisches Museum Wien

Kaplan turbines are widely used throughout the world for electrical power production. They cover the lowest head hydro sites and are especially suited for high flow conditions.

Inexpensive micro turbines on the Kaplan turbine model are manufactured for individual power production designed for 3 m of head which can work with as little as 0.3 m of head at a highly reduced performance provided sufficient water flow.

Large Kaplan turbines are individually designed for each site to operate at the highest possible efficiency, typically over 90%. They are very expensive to design, manufacture and install, but operate for decades.

They have recently found a new application in offshore wave energy generation, see Wave Dragon.

== Variations ==
The Kaplan turbine is the most widely used of the propeller-type turbines, but several other variations exist:

- Propeller turbines have non-adjustable propeller vanes. They are used where the range of flow / power is not large. Commercial products exist for producing several hundred watts from only a few feet of head. Larger propeller turbines produce more than 100 MW. At the La Grande-1 generating station in northern Quebec, 12 propeller turbines generate 1368 MW.
- Bulb or tubular turbines are designed into the water delivery tube. A large bulb is centered in the water pipe which holds the generator, wicket gate and runner. Tubular turbines are a fully axial design, whereas Kaplan turbines have a radial wicket gate.
- Pit turbines are bulb turbines with a gear box. This allows for a smaller generator and bulb.
- Straflo turbines are axial turbines with the generator outside of the water channel, connected to the periphery of the runner.
- S-turbines eliminate the need for a bulb housing by placing the generator outside of the water channel. This is accomplished with a jog in the water channel and a shaft connecting the runner and generator.
- The VLH turbine is an open flow, very low head "kaplan" turbine slanted at an angle to the water flow. It has a large diameter >3.55 m, is low speed using a directly connected shaft mounted permanent magnet alternator with electronic power regulation and is very fish friendly (<5% mortality).
- The DIVE-Turbine is a vertical propeller turbine with double regulation by wicket gates and speed variation. It covers a range of application up to 4 MW with efficiencies comparable to standard Kaplan-Turbines. Due to the propeller design with fixed blades it is considered a fish friendly turbine.
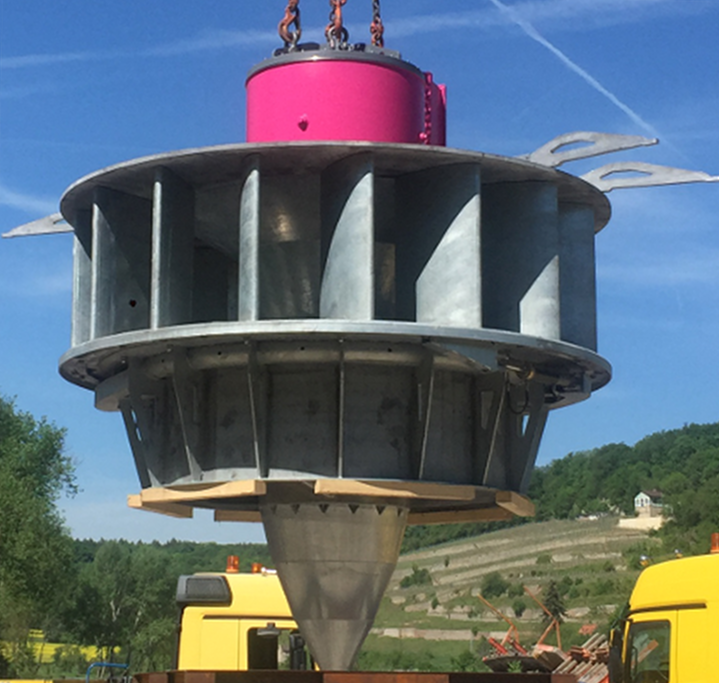
  DIVE-Turbine, a propeller turbine version, during installation
- Tyson turbines are a fixed propeller turbine designed to be immersed in a fast flowing river, either permanently anchored in the river bed, or attached to a boat or barge.
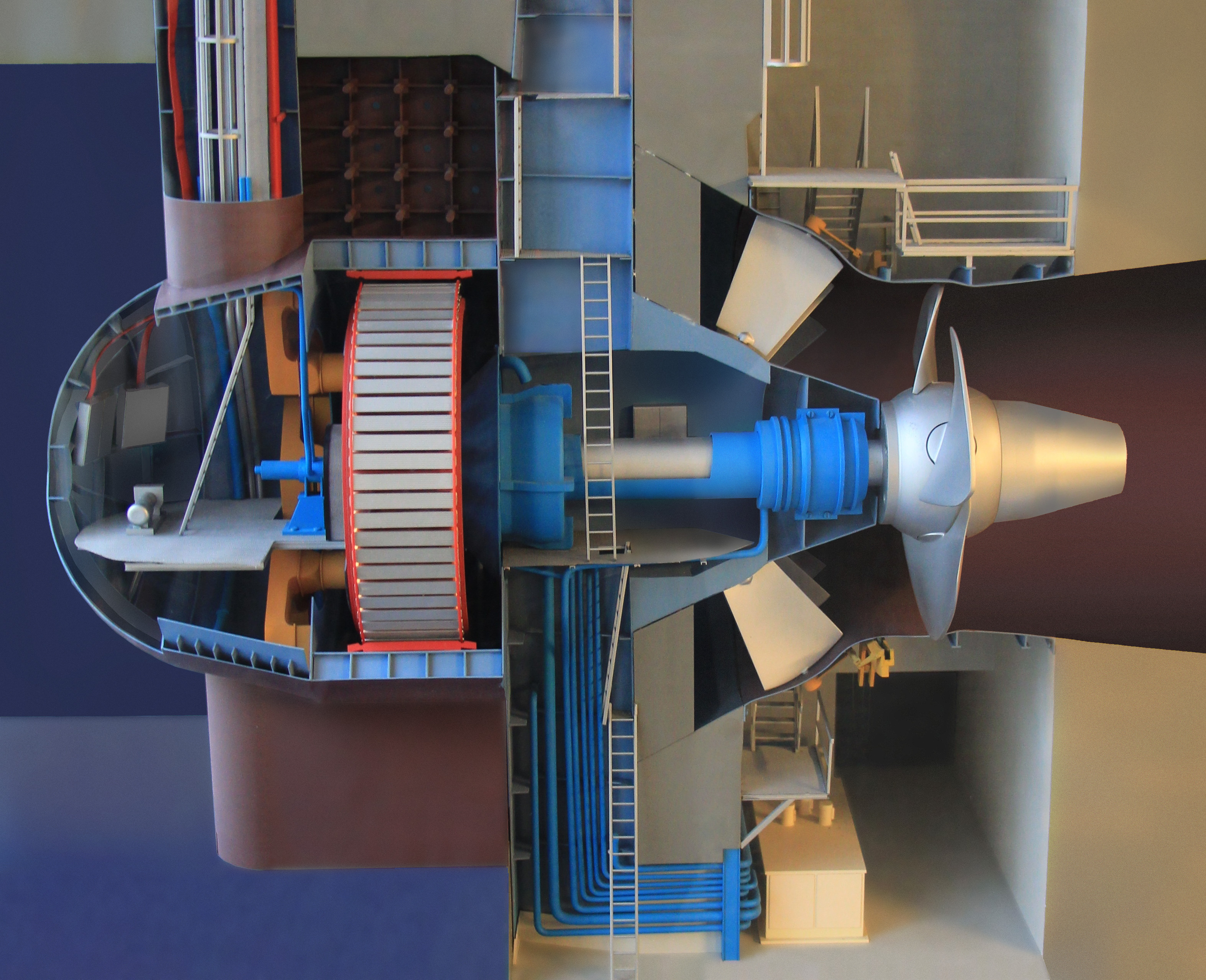
Model of a bulb or tubular turbine

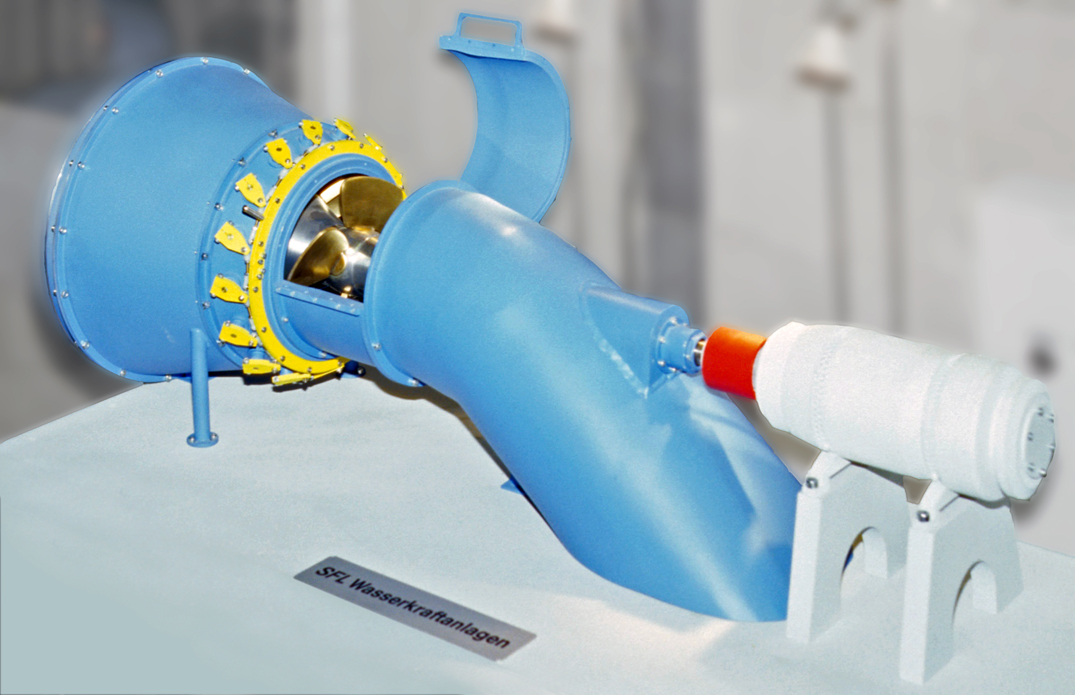
Model of a S-turbine

Schematic of a straflo-turbine

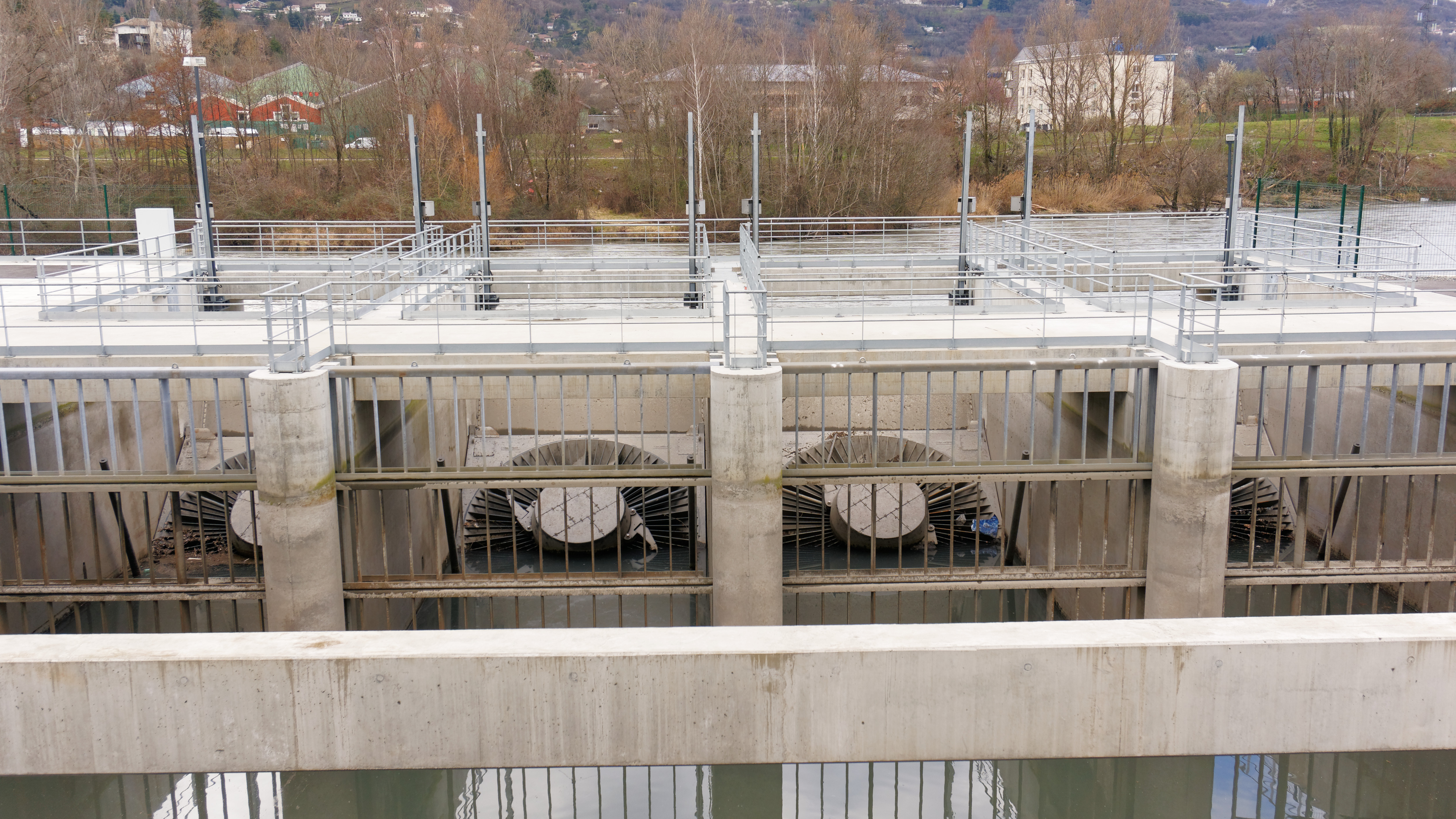
VLH turbines

Schematic of a DIVE-Turbine

== See also ==
- Banki turbine
- Draft tube
- Francis turbine
- Gorlov helical turbine
- Pelton wheel
- Screw turbine
- Sensor fish, a device used to study the impact of fish
  travelling through the Francis and Kaplan turbines
- Three-dimensional losses and correlation in turbomachinery
- Turbine
- Water turbine
