= Compounding of steam turbines =

Use of multiple stages in a single turbine

In steam turbine design, compounding is a method of extracting steam energy in multiple stages rather than a single one. Each stage of a compounded steam turbine has its own set of nozzles and rotors. These are arranged in series, either keyed to the common shaft or fixed to the casing. The arrangement allows either the steam pressure or the jet velocity to be absorbed incrementally.

== Purpose ==
Compounded steam turbines are used to reduce rotor speeds to achieve optimal operating revolutions per minute. The steam produced in the boiler has sufficiently high enthalpy when superheated. In all turbines the blade velocity is directly proportional to the velocity of the steam passing over the blade. Now, if the entire energy of the steam is extracted in one stage, i.e. if the steam is expanded from the boiler pressure to the condenser pressure in a single stage, then its velocity will be very high. Hence the velocity of the rotor (to which the blades are keyed) can reach to about 30,000 rpm, which is too high for practical uses due to very high vibration. Moreover, at such high speeds the centrifugal forces are immense, and can damage the structure. Hence, compounding is needed. The high velocity steam just strikes on a single ring of rotor that causes wastage of steam ranging 10% to 12%. To overcome the wastage of steam, compounding of steam turbines are used.

== Types ==
In an impulse steam turbine, compounding can be achieved in the following three ways:

1. Velocity compounding
2. Pressure compounding
3. Pressure-Velocity Compounding

In a reaction turbine, compounding can be achieved only by pressure compounding.

In general, the types of steam turbine include:

1. Impulse: There is no change in the pressure of the steam as it passes through the moving blades. There is change only in the velocity of the steam flow.
2. Reaction: There is change in both pressure and velocity as the steam flows through the moving blades.

== Velocity compounding of impulse turbine ==
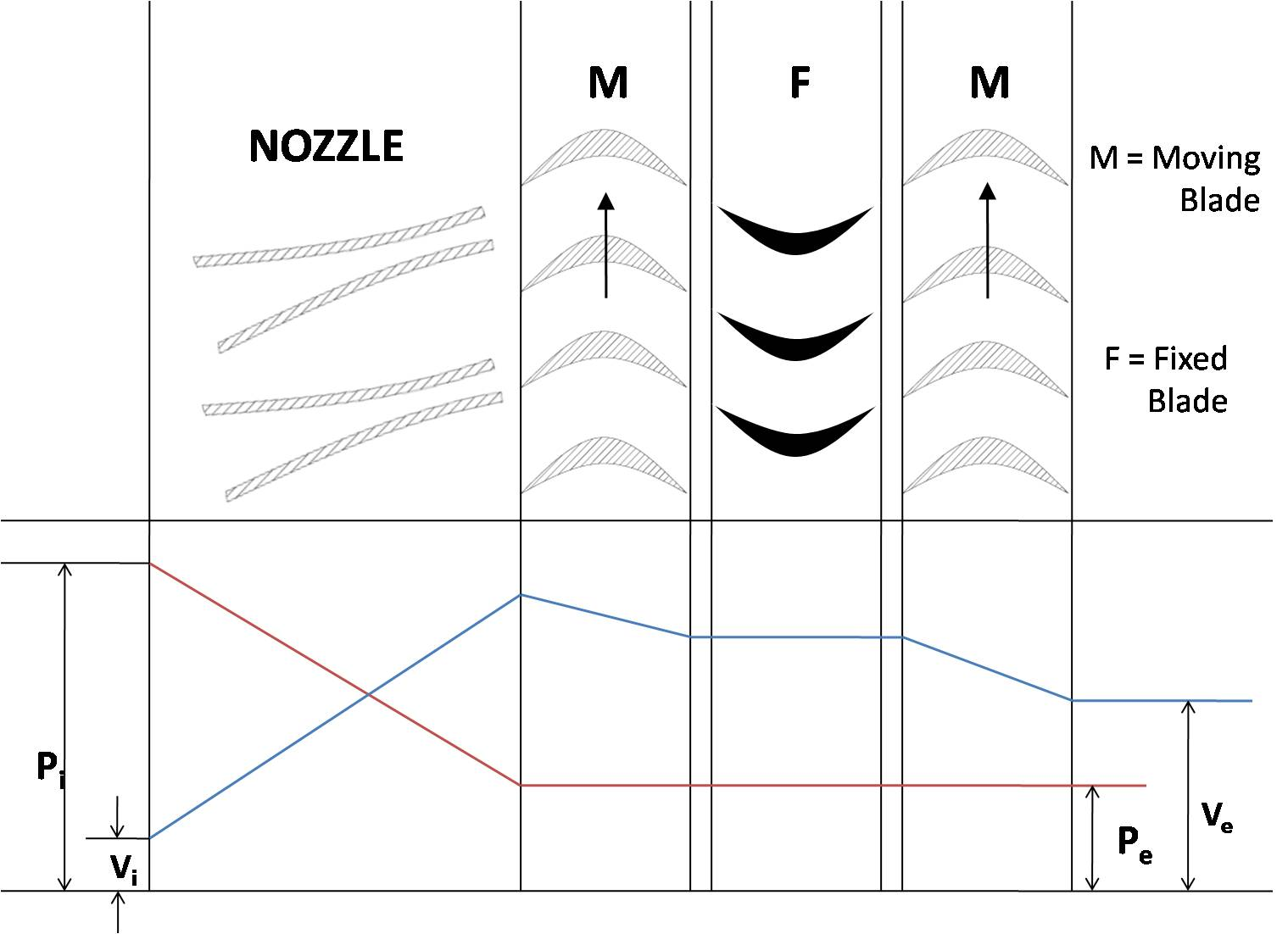
Fig-1: Schematic Diagram of Curtis Stage Impulse Turbine

The velocity compounded Impulse turbine was first proposed by C.G. Curtis to solve the problem of single stage Impulse turbine for use of high pressure and temperature steam.

The rings of moving blades are separated by rings of fixed blades. The moving blades are keyed to the turbine shaft and the fixed blades are fixed to the casing. The high pressure steam coming from the boiler is expanded in the nozzle first. The Nozzle converts the pressure energy of the steam into kinetic energy. The total enthalpy drop and hence the pressure drop occurs in the nozzle. Hence, the pressure thereafter remains constant.

This high velocity steam is directed on to the first set (ring) of moving blades. As the steam flows over the blades, due to the shape of the blades, it imparts some of its momentum to the blades and loses some velocity. Only a part of the high kinetic energy is absorbed by these blades. The remainder is exhausted on to the next ring of fixed blade. The function of the fixed blades is to redirect the steam leaving from the first ring of moving blades to the second ring of moving blades. There is no change in the velocity of the steam as it passes through the fixed blades. The steam then enters the next ring of moving blades; this process is repeated until practically all the energy of the steam has been absorbed.

A schematic diagram of the Curtis stage impulse turbine, with two rings of moving blades, and one ring of fixed blades is shown in figure 1. The figure also shows the changes in the pressure and the absolute steam velocity as it passes through the stages.

Where:

$P_i$ = pressure of steam at inlet
$V_i$ = velocity of steam at inlet
$P_e$ = pressure of steam at outlet
$V_e$ = velocity of steam at outlet

In the above figure there are two rings of moving blades separated by a single of ring of fixed blades. As discussed earlier the entire pressure drop occurs in the nozzle, and there are no subsequent pressure losses in any of the following stages. Velocity drop occurs in the moving blades and not in fixed blades.

=== Velocity diagram ===
As shown in the above diagram there are two rings of moving blades separated by a ring of fixed blades. The velocity diagram in figure 2, shows the various components of steam velocity and the blade velocity of the moving blades.

Where:

$V_a$ = absolute velocity of steam
$V_r$ = relative velocity of steam
$V_b$ = Blade velocity
$\theta$ = Nozzle angle
$\Phi$ = Blade entrance angle
$\gamma$ = Blade exit angle
$\delta$ = fluid exit angle

From the above figure it can be seen that the steam, after exiting from the moving blades, enters into the fixed blades. The fixed blades redirect the steam into the next set of moving blades. Hence, steam loses its velocity in multiple stages rather than in a single stage.

==== Optimum velocity ====
It is the velocity of the blades at which maximum power output can be achieved. Hence, the optimum blade velocity for this case is:

$$V_{b,optimum} = \frac{V_{a1}\cos\theta_{1}}{2n}$$

where $n$ is the number of stages.

This value of optimum velocity is 1/n times that of the single stage turbine. This means that maximum power can be produced at much lower blade velocities.

However, the work produced in each stage is not the same. The ratio of work produced in a 2-stage turbine is 3:1 as one move from higher to lower pressure. This ratio is 5:3:1 in three stage turbine and changes to 7:5:3:1 in a four-stage turbine.

=== Disadvantages of velocity compounding ===
- Due to the high steam velocity there are high friction losses.
- Work produced in the low-pressure stages is much less.
- The designing and fabrication of blades that can withstand such high velocities is difficult.

== Pressure compounding of impulse turbine ==
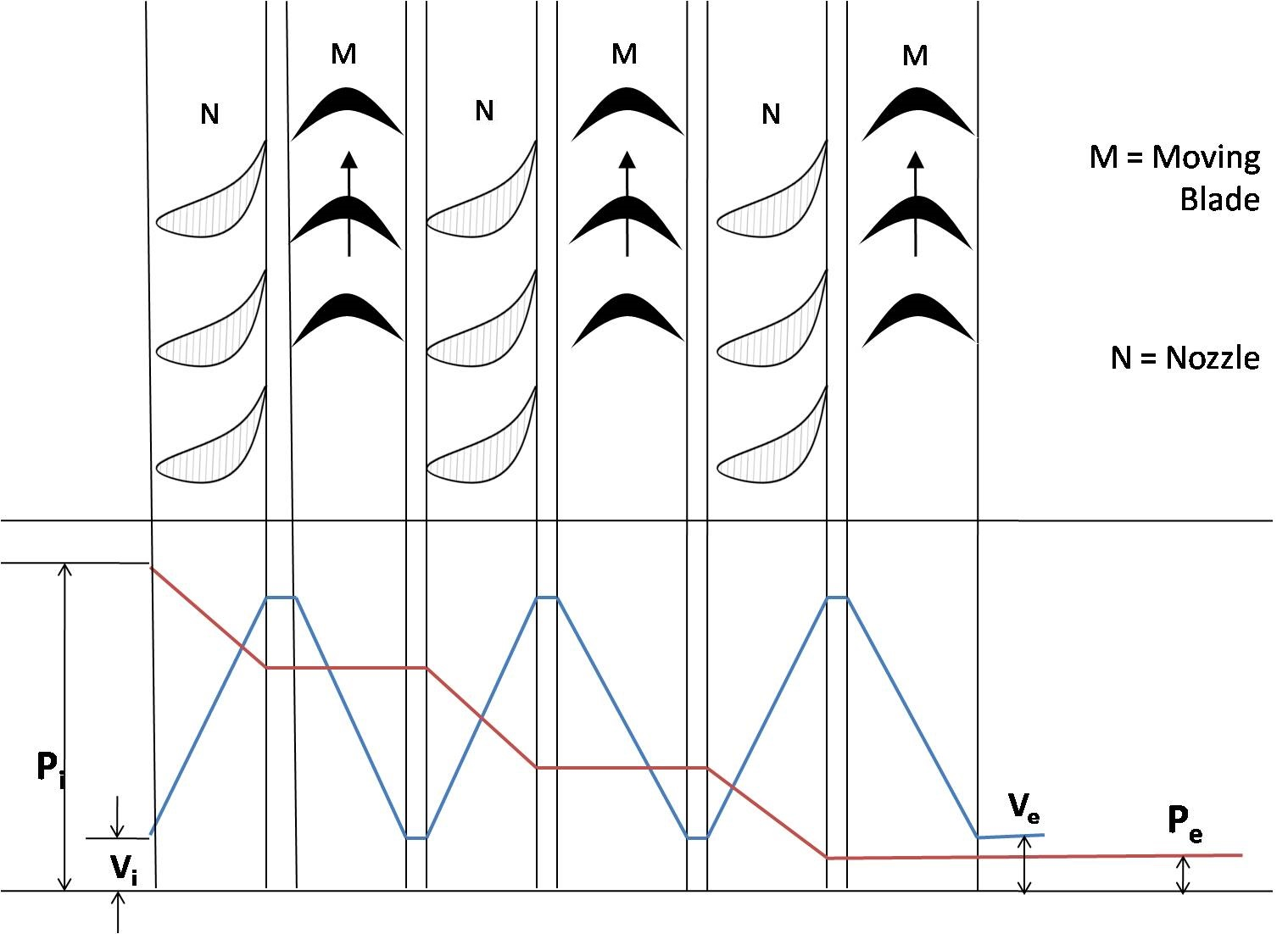
Fig-3: Schematic Diagram of Pressure compounded Impulse Turbine

The pressure compounded Impulse turbine is also called a Rateau turbine, after its inventor. This is used to solve the problem of high blade velocity in the single-stage impulse turbine.

It consists of alternate rings of nozzles and turbine blades. The nozzles are fitted to the casing and the blades are keyed to the turbine shaft.

In this type of compounding, the steam is expanded in a number of stages, instead of just one (nozzle) in the velocity compounding. It is done by the fixed blades which act as nozzles. The steam expands equally in all rows of fixed blade. The steam coming from the boiler is fed to the first set of fixed blades i.e. the nozzle ring. The steam is partially expanded in the nozzle ring. Hence, there is a partial decrease in pressure of the incoming steam. This leads to an increase in the velocity of the steam. Therefore, the pressure decreases and velocity increases partially in the nozzle.

This is then passed over the set of moving blades. As the steam flows over the moving blades, nearly all its velocity is absorbed. However, the pressure remains constant during this process. After this it is passed into the nozzle ring and is again partially expanded. Then it is fed into the next set of moving blades, and this process is repeated until the condenser pressure is reached.

This process has been illustrated in figure 3 where the symbols have the same meaning as given above.

It is a three-stage pressure compounded impulse turbine. Each stage consists of one ring of fixed blades, which act as nozzles, and one ring of moving blades. As shown in the figure, pressure drop takes place in the nozzles and is distributed in many stages.

An important point to note here is that the inlet steam velocities to each stage of moving blades are essentially equal. It is because the velocity corresponds to the lowering of the pressure. Since, in a pressure compounded steam turbine, only a part of the steam is expanded in each nozzle. The steam velocity is lower than in the previous case. It can be explained mathematically from the following formula i.e.

$$\frac{V_{1}^2}{2}+{h_{1}} = \frac{V_{2}^2}{2}+{h_{2}}$$

where,

$V_1$ = absolute exit velocity of fluid

$h_1$ = enthalpy of fluid at exit

$V_2$ = absolute entry velocity of fluid

$h_2$ = enthalpy of fluid at entry

One can see from the formula that only a fraction of the enthalpy is converted into velocity in the fixed blades. Hence, velocity is less as compared to the previous case.

=== Velocity diagram ===
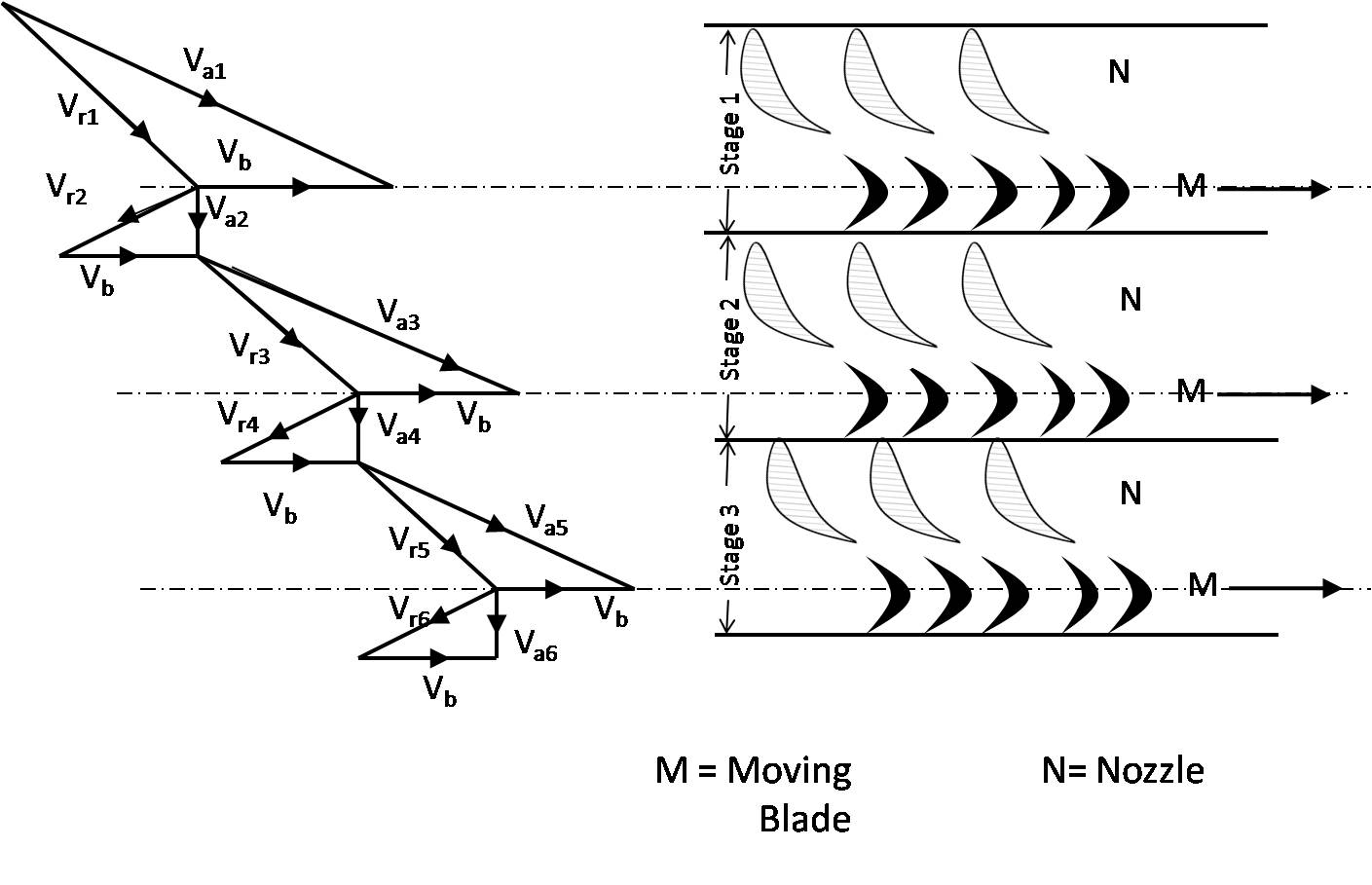
Fig-4: Velocity Diagram of Pressure compounded Impulse Turbine

The velocity diagram shown in figure 4 gives detail about the various components of steam velocity and Blade velocity.

where, symbols have the same meaning as given above.

An important point to note from the above velocity diagram is that the fluid exit angle (δ) is 90⁰. This indicates that the whirl velocity of fluid at exit of all stages is zero, which is in compliance with the optimum velocity concept (as discussed earlier).

The ratio of work produced in different stages is similar to the above type.

=== Disadvantages of pressure compounding ===
- Since there is pressure drop in the nozzles, it has to be made air-tight.
- They are much larger at 34 inches

== Pressure-velocity compounded impulse turbine ==
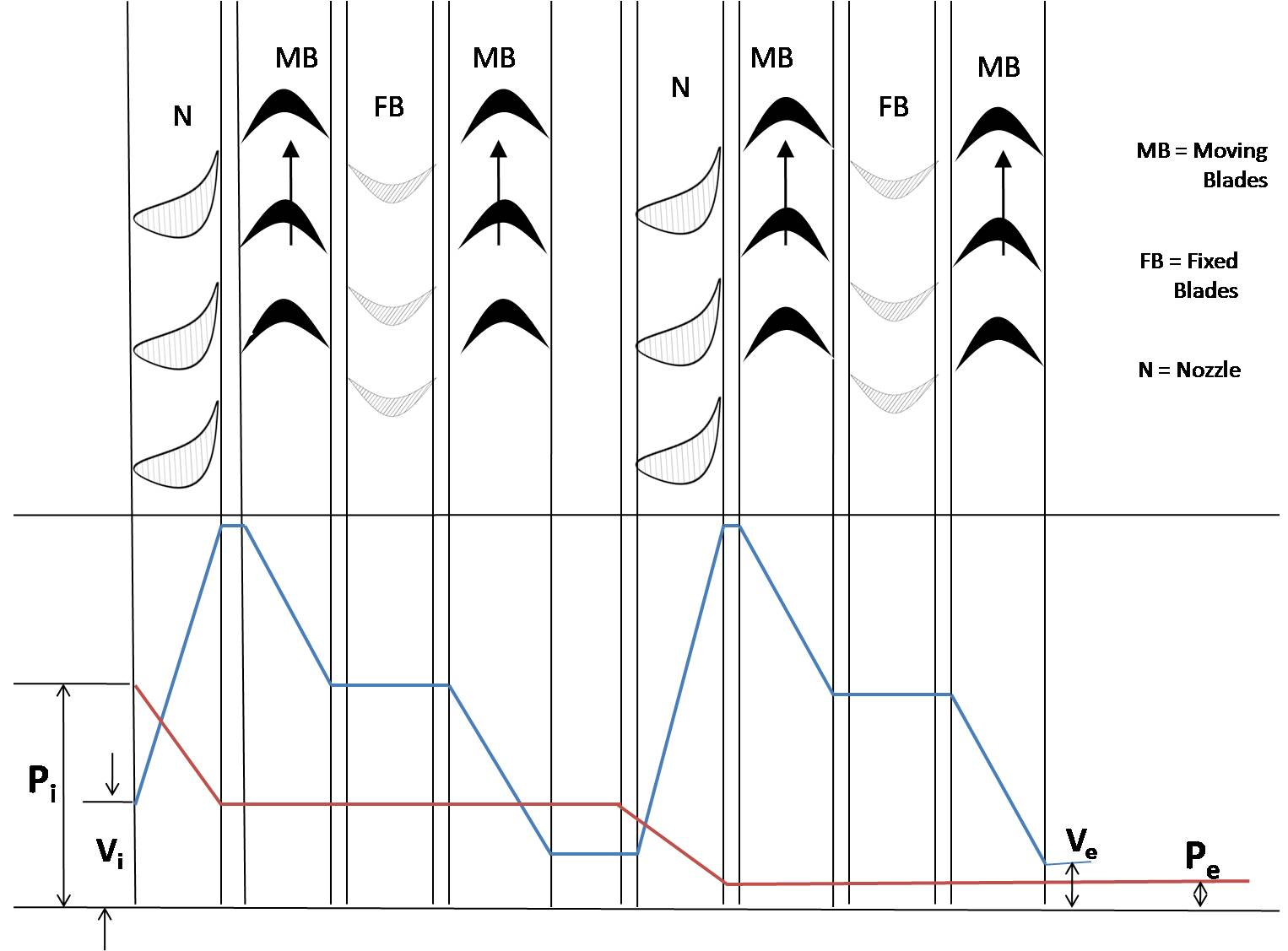
Fig-5: Schematic Diagram of Pressure-Velocity compounded Impulse Turbine

It is a combination of the above two types of compounding. The total pressure drop of the steam is divided into a number of stages. Each stage consists of rings of fixed and moving blades. Each set of rings of moving blades is separated by a single ring of fixed blades. In each stage there is one ring of fixed blades and 3–4 rings of moving blades. Each stage acts as a velocity compounded impulse turbine.

The fixed blades act as nozzles. The steam coming from the boiler is passed to the first ring of fixed blades, where it gets partially expanded. The pressure partially decreases and the velocity rises correspondingly. The velocity is absorbed by the following rings of moving blades until it reaches the next ring of fixed blades and the whole process is repeated once again.

This process is shown diagrammatically in figure 5.

where, symbols have their usual meaning.

== Pressure compounding of reaction turbine ==
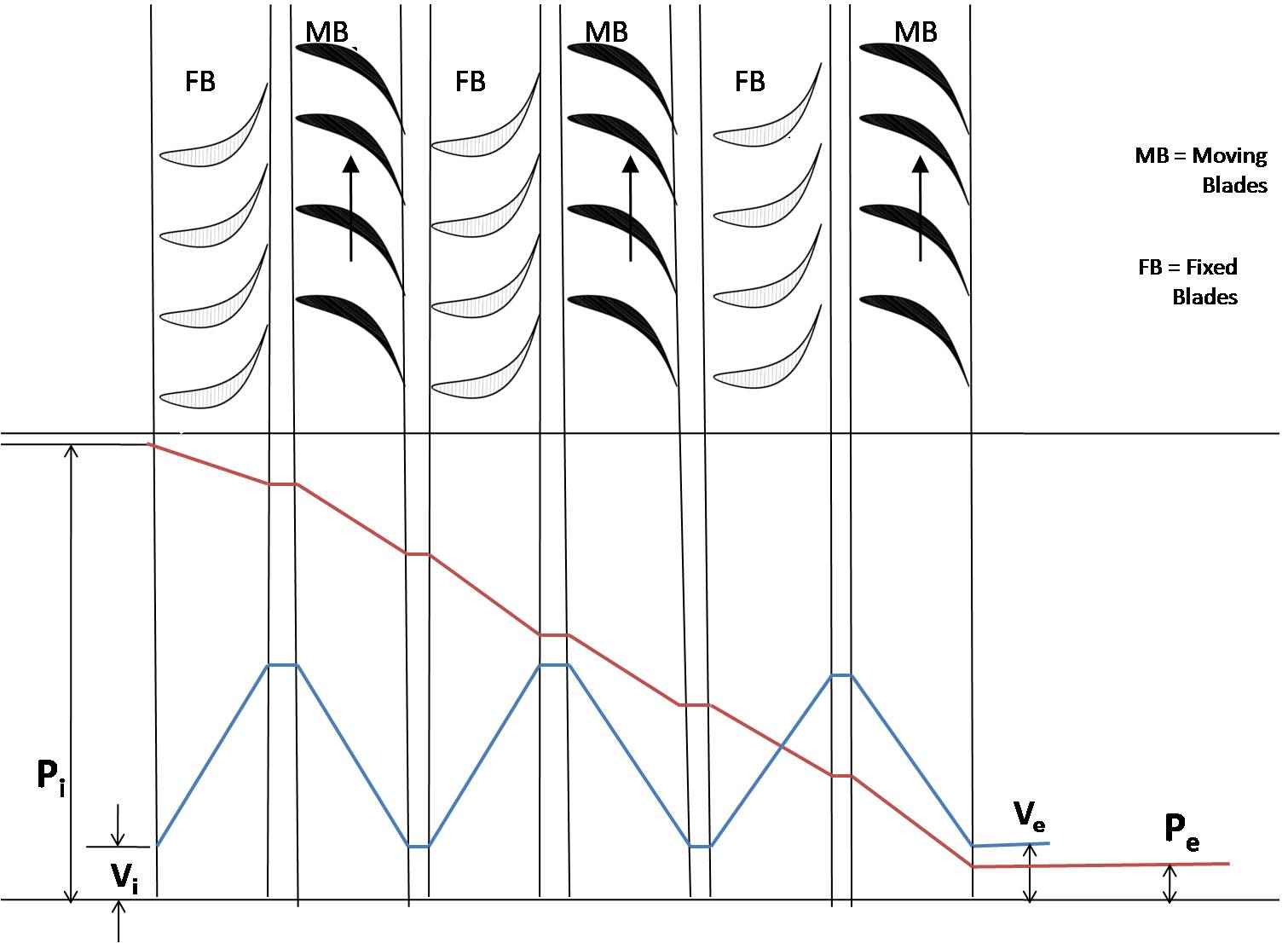
Fig-6: Schematic Diagram of Pressure compounded Reaction Turbine

As explained earlier a reaction turbine is one in which there is pressure and velocity loss in the moving blades. The moving blades have a converging steam nozzle. Hence when the steam passes over the fixed blades, it expands with decrease in steam pressure and increase in kinetic energy.

This type of turbine has a number of rings of moving blades attached to the rotor and an equal number of fixed blades attached to the casing. In this type of turbine the pressure drops take place in a number of stages.

The steam passes over a series of alternate fixed and moving blades. The fixed blades act as nozzles i.e. they change the direction of the steam and also expand it. Then steam is passed on the moving blades, which further expand the steam and also absorb its velocity.

This is explained in figure 6.

where symbols have the same meaning as above.

=== Velocity diagram ===
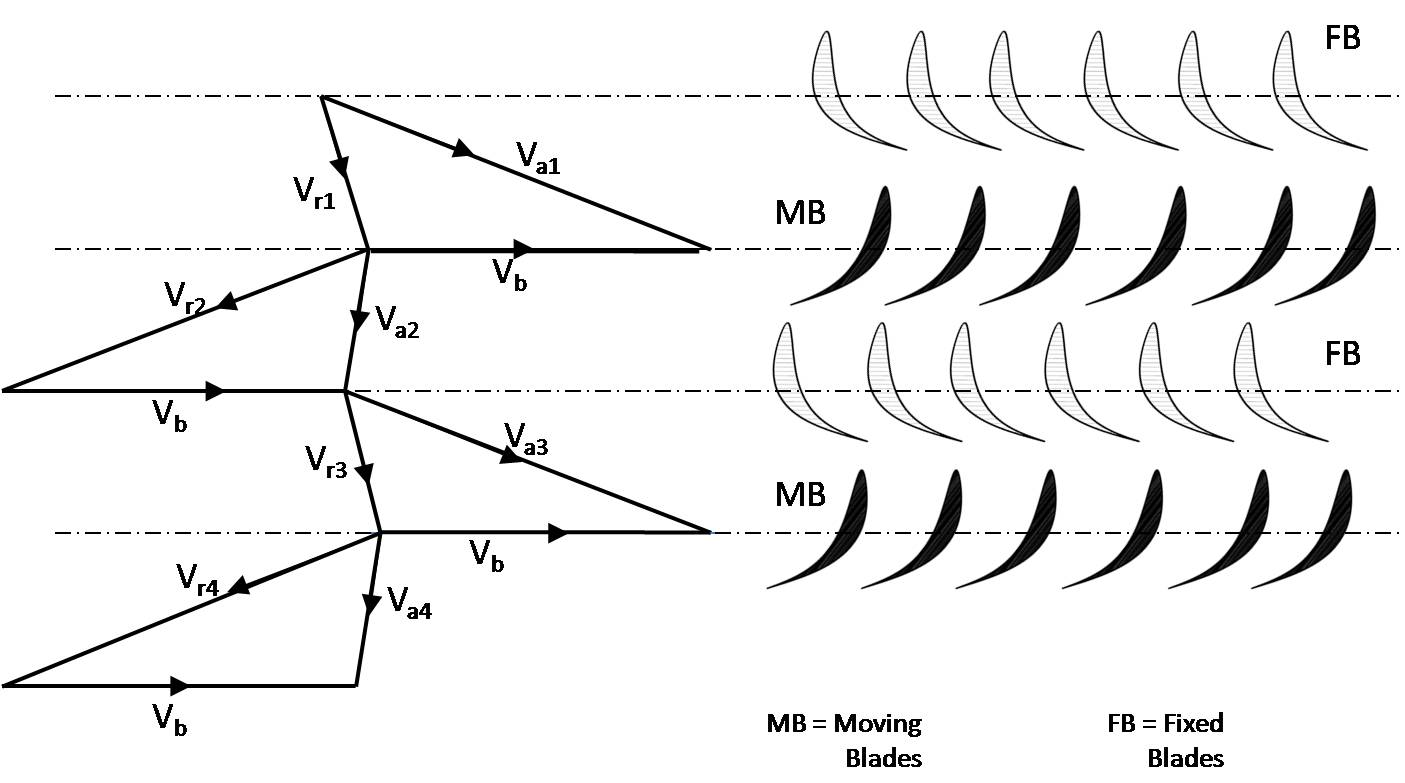
Fig-7: Velocity Diagram of Pressure Compounded Reaction turbine

The velocity diagram given in figure 7 gives a detail about the various components of steam velocity and blade velocity (symbols have the same meaning as above).

== See also ==
- Pressure compounding in turbines
