= Tyson turbine =

Conical water turbine

Animatic of a tyson turbine rotating in a flow

The Tyson turbine is a conical water turbine with helical blades emerging partway down from the apex gradually increasing in radial dimension and decreasing in pitch as they spiral towards the base of the cone. This design doesn't need a casement, as it is inserted directly into flowing water.

Marketed as part of a hydropower system that extracts power from the flow of water, the turbine is mounted below a raft, driving a power system, typically a lift irrigation pump or generator, on top of the raft by belt or gear. The turbine is towed into the middle of a river or stream, where the flow is the fastest, and tied off to shore. It requires no local engineering, and can easily be moved to other locations.
