= Caledonian Forest =

Ecoregion in the British Isles

Coordinates: 57.1200°N 4.7100°W

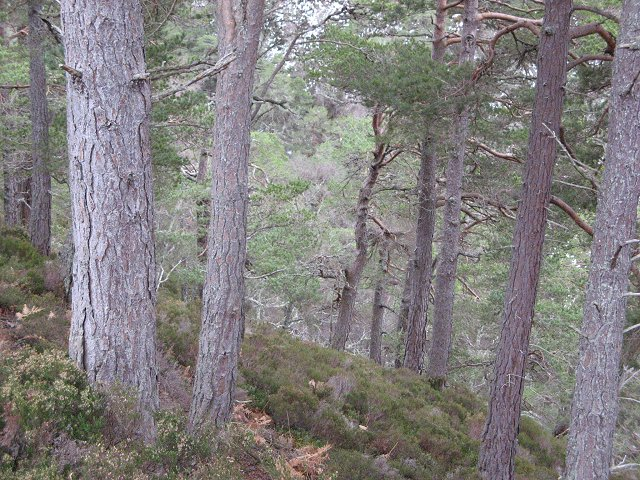
- Caledonian Forest above the Allt Ruadh in Glen Feshie

- Map of the ecoregion

Ecology
- Realm: Palearctic
- Biome: Temperate coniferous forest
- Borders: Celtic broadleaf forests; North Atlantic moist mixed forests

Geography
- Area: 180 km^{2} (69 mi^{2})

The Caledonian Forest is the ancient (old-growth) temperate forest of Scotland. The forest today is a reduced-extent version of the pre-human-settlement forest, existing in several dozen remnant areas.

The Scots pines of the Caledonian Forest are directly descended from the first pines to arrive in Scotland following the Late Glacial; arriving about 7000 BCE. The forest reached its maximum extent about 5000 BC after which the Scottish climate became wetter and windier. This changed climate reduced the extent of the forest significantly by 2000 BC. From that date, human actions (including the grazing effects of sheep and deer) together with further climate shifts reduced it to its current extent. Exactly how far human activity should be blamed is difficult to determine (discussed below).

The forest exists as 35 remnants, as authenticated by Steven & Carlisle (1959) (or 84 remnants, including later subjective subdivisions of the 35) covering about 180 square kilometres (69 sq mi) or 18,000 hectares (44,000 acres). The Scots pines of these remnants are, by definition, directly descended from the first pines to arrive in Scotland following the ice age. These remnants have adapted genetically to different Scottish environments, and as such, are globally unique; their ecological characteristics form an unbroken, 9000-year chain of natural evolution with a distinct variety of soils, vegetation, and animals.

To a great extent the remnants survived on land that was either too steep, too rocky, or too remote to be agriculturally useful. The largest remnants are in Strathspey and Strath Dee on highly acidic, freely drained glacial deposits that are of little value for cultivation and domestic stock. An examination of the earliest maps of Scotland suggests that the extent of the Caledonian Forest remnants has changed little since 1600 AD.

The extent and nature of the ancient forest is much contested, as are the reasons for its decline. Authorities including Christopher Smout (of the Institute for Environmental History at St Andrews University) and Dr Alan Macdonald of Dundee University have pointed to the difficulty of defining a 'forest' and how that may be distinguished from an open landscape with varying degrees of light tree cover, and have argued that the idea of a continuous forest - sometimes called the Old Wood or the Great Wood of Caledon - covering much of Northern Scotland is 'myth'.

Much rhetoric has been introduced into the arguments regarding the destruction of the forest. Mabey claims that 'it was exploitation by the English that led to the destruction of the Old Wood of Caledon' and that this began in the 17th century, first to provide charcoal for iron foundries and then timber during the Napoleonic wars. But the evidence for this is poor. Extensive research (summarised by e.g. Tipping and Milburn) has shown that the decline of the forest had begun thousands of years earlier, and Smout, Macdonald and others have pointed out that Scottish landowners were entirely complicit in the felling for many and varied purposes (for example leather tanning using bark, and building works as Scotland's urban population grew), while as regards iron it would have been economic madness to invest heavily in iron production and then destroy the required fuel resource, and that this rarely happened.

== Etymology ==
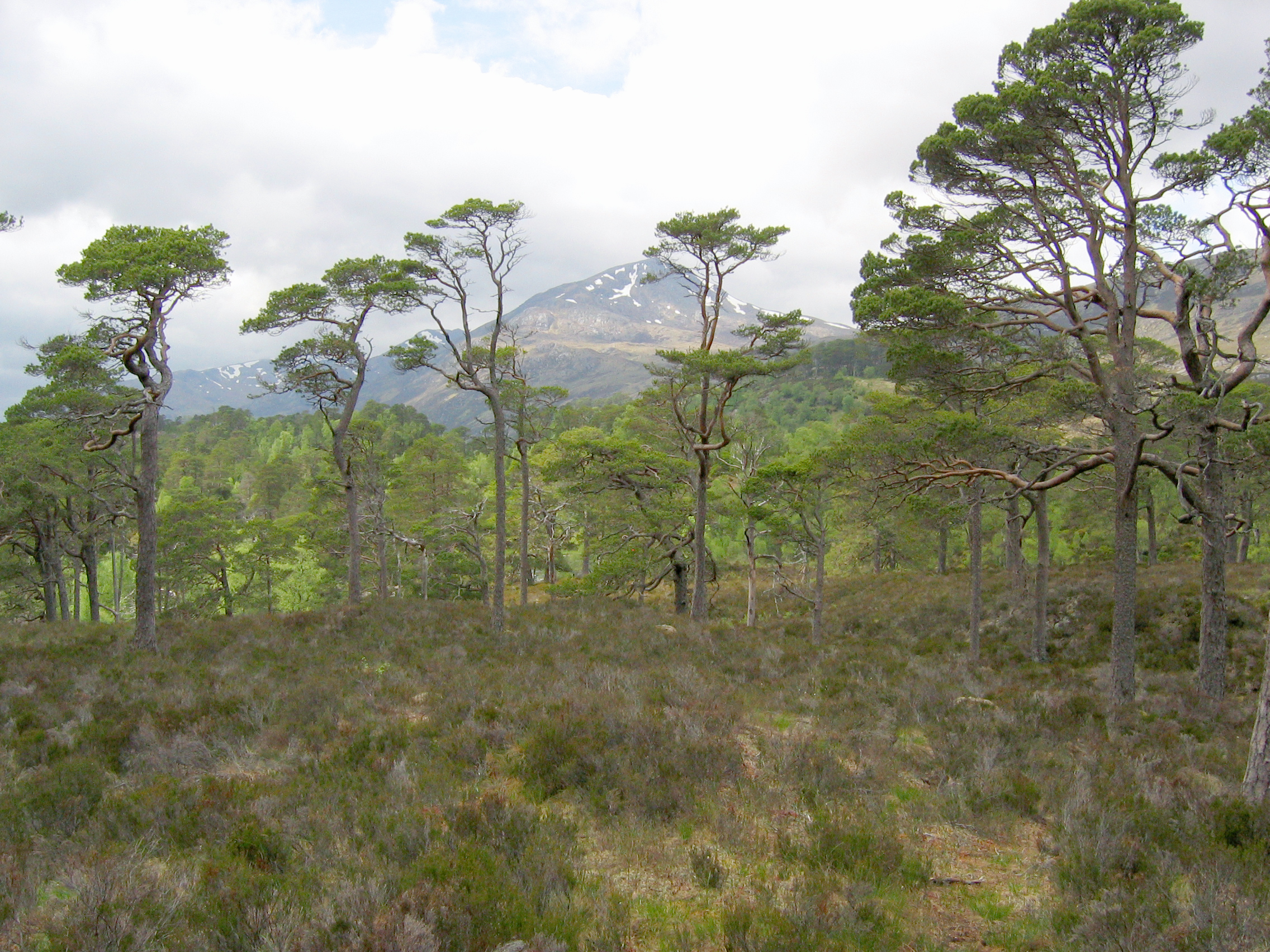
Mam Sodhail as seen from Glen Affric

The name comes from Pliny the Elder, who reveals that 30 years after the Roman invasion of Britain their knowledge of it did not extend beyond the neighbourhood of silva caledonia. He gives no information about where the silva caledonia was, but the known extent of the Roman occupation suggest that it was north of the River Clyde and west of the River Tay. DJ Breeze has examined the Roman and other sources for 'the Great Myth of Caledon', demonstrating the extreme vagueness of this evidence; it is suggested that Pliny's account may be seen in the Roman tradition of explaining away military defeat by referring to fearsome terrain.

== Diversity ==
=== Flora ===
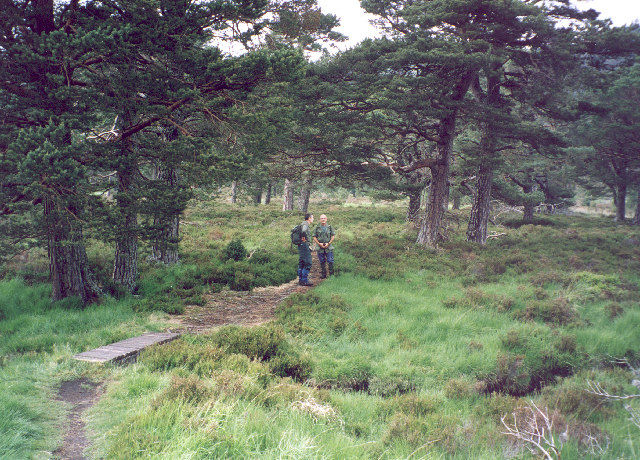
Caledonian pinewoods near Loch an Eilein

Following the last glacial period, trees began to recolonise what is now the British Isles over a land bridge which is now beneath the Strait of Dover. Forests of this type were found all over what is now the island of Great Britain for a few thousand years, before the climate began to slowly warm in the Atlantic period, and the temperate coniferous forests began retreating north into the Scottish Highlands, the last remaining climatic region suitable for them in the British Isles (see Climate of Scotland).

The native pinewoods that formed this westernmost outpost of the taiga of post-glacial Europe are estimated to have covered 15,000 km^{2} (3,700,000 acres) as a vast wilderness of Scots pine, birch, rowan, aspen, juniper, oak and a few other hardy species. On the west coast, oak and birch predominated in a temperate rainforest ecosystem rich in ferns, mosses and lichens.

The charity Trees for Life (Scotland) has been working to conserve the remaining forest, and reforest areas where it has been lost, using fences to prevent deer from eating saplings. This involves the reintroduction of the full range of native flora, including mycorrhizal fungi that assist soil regeneration.

=== Fauna ===
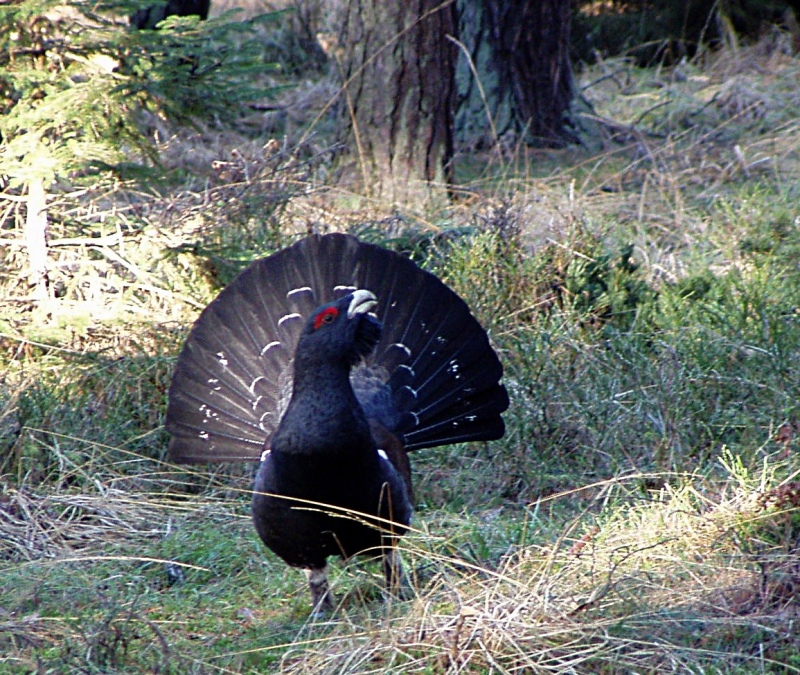
Western capercaillie – a species that depends on the Caledonian Forest

Being a unique ecosystem in the British Isles, the Caledonian Pinewoods are home to some of the islands' rarest wildlife. It is considered to be one of the last remaining wildernesses in the British Isles.

Breeding bird species in Caledonian pine forests found breeding nowhere else in the British Isles:

- Western capercaillie
- Common goldeneye
- Crested tit
- Parrot crossbill
- Scottish crossbill

Breeding bird species in Caledonian pine forests rare elsewhere in the British Isles:

- Black grouse
- Red crossbill
- Goosander
- Siskin
- Redpoll
- Long-eared owl
- Osprey
- Red-breasted merganser
- Redwing
- Temminck's stint
- Wood sandpiper
- Horned grebe
- Golden eagle

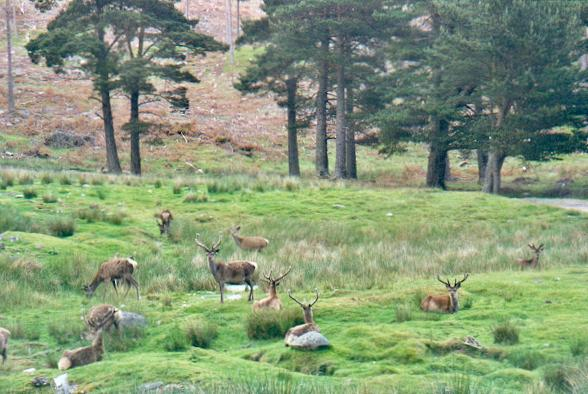
Red deer near a patch of Caledonian pinewood

Mammal species present in Caledonian pine forests:

- Reindeer: Reintroduced in the 1950s.
- Eurasian beaver: Reintroduced in the 2000s or earlier.
- Wild boar: Reintroduced from escaped farm boar in the late 20th century.
- Feral goat
- Mountain hare
- European pine marten
- Red deer
- Red fox
- Red squirrel
- Roe deer
- European wildcat

Insect species in the Caledonian pine forests:

- Scottish wood ant: A mound building species in the Formica genus that is almost exclusively found near and inside Caledonian pine forests, as they primarily feed on honeydew that they collect from various scale insects living on the Scots pines found in the forest.

Mammal species extinct in Caledonian pine forests:

- Aurochs
- Brown bear
- Eurasian lynx
- Grey wolf
- Eurasian elk (Called moose in North American English)
- Tarpan (wild horse)

=== Reintroductions ===
In recent years, there has been a growing interest to reintroduce animals which are native to but currently extinct in Great Britain, back into Caledonian pine forests. Corporations have been set up to persuade the government to allow this. The long-running campaign to reintroduce the Eurasian beaver to Knapdale in Argyll has been successful, and there is some support for the reintroduction of the grey wolf and Eurasian lynx.

Recently, some landowners have announced plans to build large game reserves on their land and release the species within them. Paul Lister plans to release Eurasian lynx, brown bear, grey wolf, elk, wild boar and species already present in Scotland into a huge 200 km^{2} (49,000-acre) enclosure at his estate, Alladale Wilderness Reserve, although releasing top predators such as wolves and bears has become a difficult proposition with local and national regulations. An initial trial enclosure of 5.5 km^{2} (1,400 acres) was built with elk, wild boar, red deer and roe deer.

== Conservation ==
A review of the native pinewoods of Scotland, Steven & Carlisle (1959) highlighted the plight of the remaining 35 ancient pinewood sites, many of which had been damaged by felling, fire and intensive grazing from sheep and deer. A later review in the 1980s showed that further damage had occurred through ploughing and planting with non-native conifers with less than 12,000 ha of the ancient habitat remaining. A subsequent guide to the ancient pinewoods reviews the conservation story and provides a summary of the management in each site as well as a guide on how to reach all the woods using public transport, walking, and cycling. Much of the remaining Caledonian pine forest is fully protected with most of the forest lying within the Cairngorms National Park. The Royal Society for the Protection of Birds (RSPB) and Forestry and Land Scotland also own several areas of pinewood on their reserves. One of the largest remaining areas is Ballochbuie Forest on the Balmoral Estate, which is protected as a Special Area of Conservation under the European Union Habitats Directive.

Scientific research continues on the ecology of the Caledonian Forest and its restoration. Populations of the rare groundcover, Linnaea borealis, may be too isolated from one another to produce viable seed. Diversity of fungi has also been affected by the decrease in habitat. The agaric fungus Mycena purpureofusca is commonly found in Caledonian pine woods, and it is considered an indicator species for that habitat type. Fire appears to increase the natural recruitment of Scots pine seedlings.

== Legend, folklore and literature ==
In the Matter of Britain, the forest is the site of one of King Arthur's Twelve Battles, according to the Historia Brittonum, in which the battle is called Cat Coit Celidon. Scholars Rachel Bromwich and Marged Haycock suggest that the army of trees animated by sorcerers in the Old Welsh poem Cad Goddeu ("Battle of the Trees") are intended to be the Caledonian Forest.

In related Merlin literature, the figure of Myrddin Wyllt retreated to these woods in his madness after the Battle of Arfderydd in the year 573. He fled from the alleged wrath of the king of Strathclyde, Rhydderch Hael, after the slaying of Gwenddoleu ap Ceidio. This is written in the two Merlinic poems in Middle Welsh Yr Oianau and Yr Afallennau in the Black Book of Carmarthen. The forest is also the retreat of another character named Lailoken from the Vita Kentigerni, who also fled into the woods in a fit of madness and who may be the original model for Myrddin Wyllt. William A. Young argues that Brocéliande, the forest which features in Chrétien de Troyes' Arthurian romance, Le Chevalier au lion, may be the forest of Celython.

In the Middle Welsh story Culhwch and Olwen, the main character Culhwch is the grandson of a king named Celyddon Wledig, who may or may not be related to the forest in name. Another figure from the same story, Cyledyr Wyllt hints at a close relationship of the forest being a retreat for people who suffered from a special kind of madness or gwyllt (Irish geilt). In line 994 to 996 of the story, it is briefly explained, "a Chyledyr Wyllt y uab, a llad Nwython a oruc a diot y gallon, a chymhell yssu callon y dat, ac am hynny yd aeth Kyledyr yg gwyllt." ("and his son Kyledyr the Wild. Gwynn killed Nwython and cut out his heart, and forced Kyledyr to eat his father's heart, and that is how Kyledyr went mad"). Though not named directly, the very name Kyledyr Wyllt is close to the two related notions of the forest of Celyddon being where people suffering madness or gwyllt hide.

In John Buchan's 1927 historical novel Witch Wood, Scottish villagers conduct nighttime pagan ceremonies in a surviving fragment of Caledonian Forest (referred to as The Black Forest of Melanudrigill in the book) on Beltane and Lammas Tide.

== Remaining pinewoods ==
Bain (2013) lists 38 ancient pinewood sites in Britain which have been identified as the most genuinely native and natural. All of them occur in the Scottish Highlands. The Caledonian Pinewood Inventory breaks these down into 84 smaller sub-units of the main sites. In March 2019, as part of the implementation of the Forestry and Land Management (Scotland) Act 2018, the Scottish Government listed 84 sites as Caledonian pinewood in regulations, given below.

- Abernethy Forest
- Achlain
- Achnaconeran
- Achnasaul
- Achnashellach Forest
- Allt Broighleachan
- Allt Chaorunn
- Allt Coire Bhiochair
- Allt Cul
- Allt Mheuran
- Amat
- An Slochd
- Ard Trilleachan
- Ardessie
- Attadale
- Baddengorm
- Ballochbuie
- Beinn Eighe
- Black Wood of Rannoch
- Breda
- Bunloyne
- Callop River
- Carn Na Loinne
- Ceannacroc
- Coille Coire Chuilc
- Coir a' Ghamhna
- Conaglen
- Cougie
- Crannach
- Crathie
- Creag Ghuibhais
- Dark Mile
- Doire Darach
- Dubh Uisge
- Dundreggan
- Easan Dorcha
- Gleann Fuar
- Glen Affric
- Glen Avon
- Glen Barisdale
- Glen Brown
- Glen Buck
- Glen Cannich
- Glen Derry
- Glen Einig
- Glen Falloch
- Glen Ferrick
- Glen Feshie
- Glen Garry
- Glen Gour
- Glen Kinglass
- Glen Loy
- Glen Loyne
- Glen Lui
- Glen Mallie
- Glen Nevis
- Glen Quoich
- Glen Scaddie
- Glen Strae
- Glen Strathfarrar
- Glen Tanar
- Glen Tromie
- Glen Ure
- Glenmore
- Guisachan
- Kinveachy
- Loch Clair
- Loch Dochard
- Loch Hourn
- Loch Leven
- Loch Maree Islands
- Loch Shiel
- Lochindorb
- Lochourn River
- Meggernie
- Rhidorroch
- Rothiemurchus
- Shieldaig
- South Loch Airkaig
- Strath Oykel
- Strath Vaich
- Taodail
- Torphantrick
