= Loch Garten =

- Location within Scotland
- Location: Cairngorms National Park, Scottish Highlands, Scotland
- Coordinates: 57.244°N 3.690°W
- Type: loch

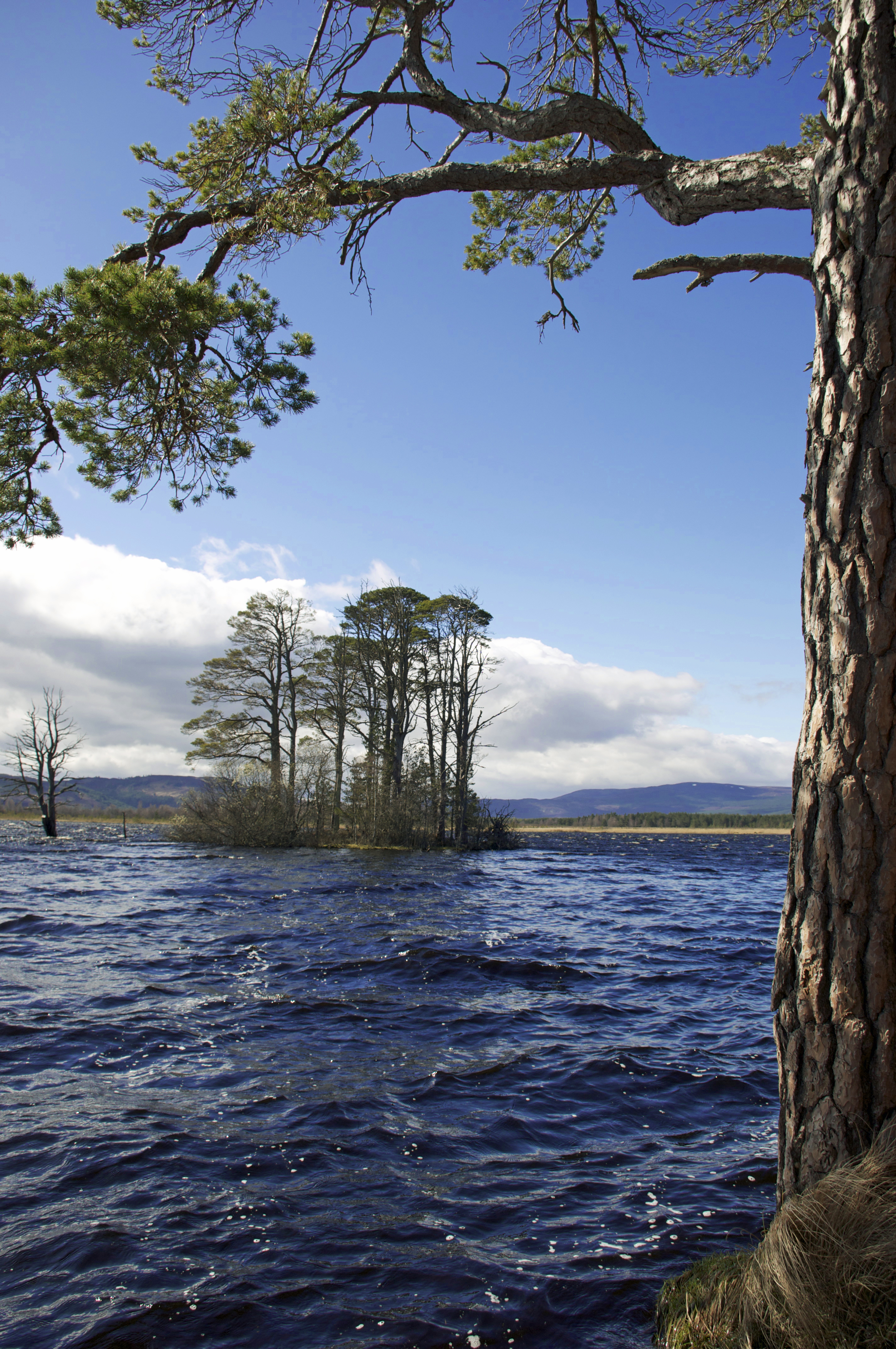

Loch Garten (Scottish Gaelic: Loch a' Ghartain) is a large Highland freshwater loch near Boat of Garten, in the Strathspey area of the Cairngorms National Park, in Scotland. It is surrounded by the tall pine trees of the Abernethy Forest, a large area (adjacent to the loch) of which is an RSPB nature reserve. The loch is renowned for its breeding population of ospreys, which lend Boat of Garten its nickname "The Osprey Village".

== Loch Garten Osprey Centre ==
Careless behaviour towards the osprey in Britain throughout the 19th century meant that the species became extinct as a breeding bird by the early 20th century. However, in 1954, two Scandinavian breeding birds arrived at Loch Garten of their own accord and established a nest in the forest beside the loch. Slowly, the species recolonised Scotland with the support of the RSPB and other conservation organisations. The reserve was subsequently purchased by the charity, and the nest has been closely monitored ever since.

Recently, a viewing hide was built near the nest to allow visitors to observe these birds of prey with ease. The hide is equipped with telescopes and other optical devices, as well as television screens displaying close-up footage of the fledglings and their parents. Live video and still photographs of the nest can also be viewed on the RSPB Loch Garten Reserve website.

Ospreys are not the only creatures to be found at Loch Garten. Western capercaillie, though elusive, inhabit the remoter parts of the reserve and can be observed performing their annual lek via the springtime "Caperwatch". Red squirrel are frequently seen around the hide, particularly at the feeders provided for them. Smaller birds, such as the Eurasian siskin, common chaffinch (in very large numbers), and great spotted woodpecker, are also present and easy to spot. Conversely, the crested tit and Scottish crossbill are more reserved and harder to find, while Eurasian wigeon can be seen swimming on the loch.

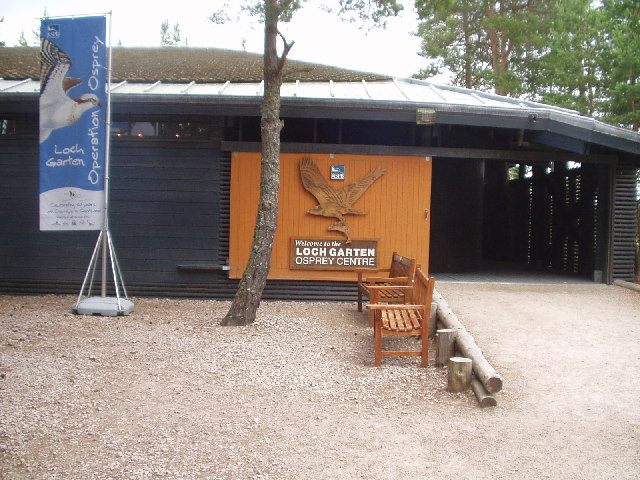
Entrance to the Osprey Centre

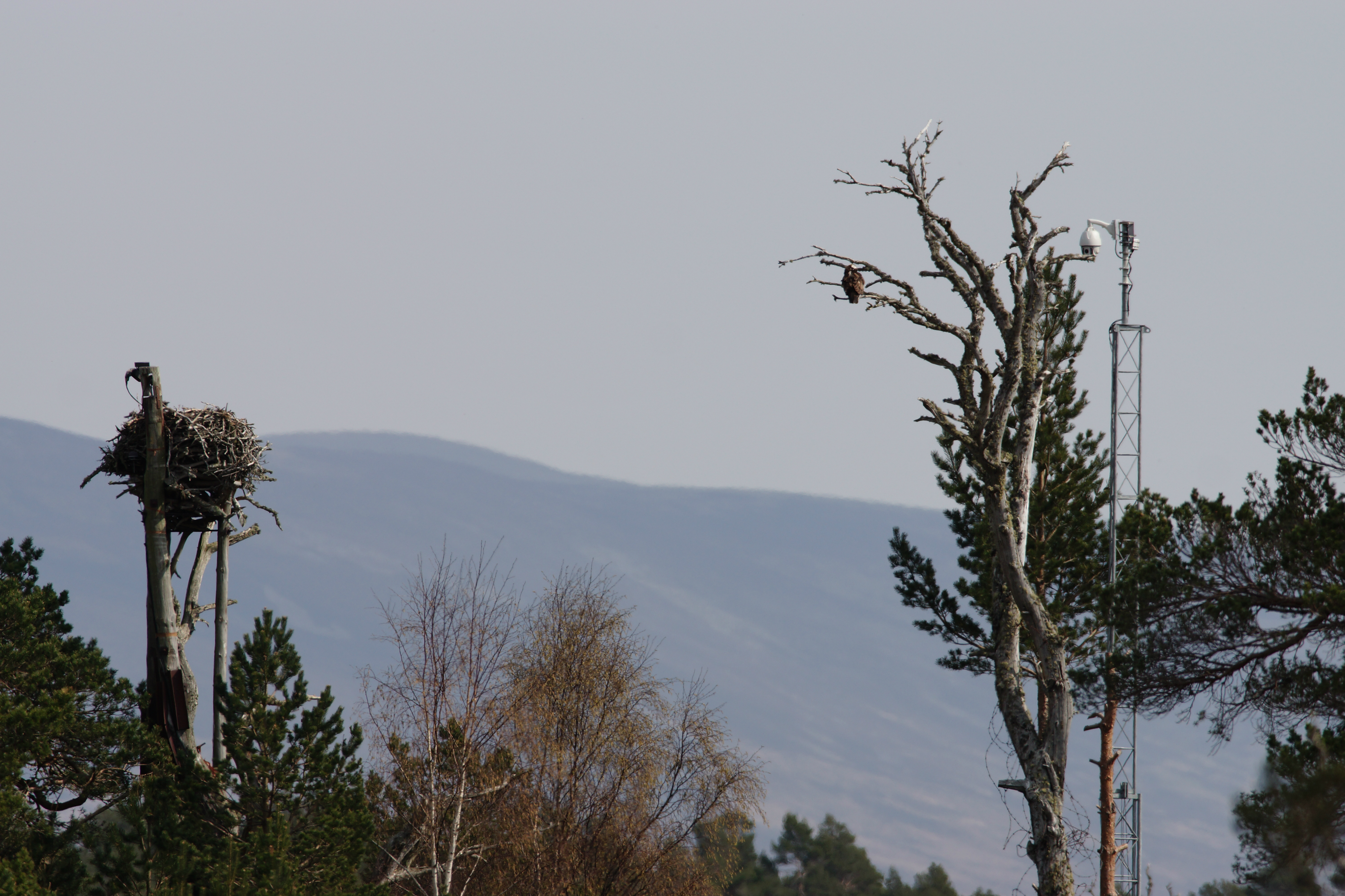
Osprey nest at Loch Garten

The Loch Garten Osprey Centre is a bird-watching facility on Loch Garten that focuses on the nest of two osprey. It is an RSPB facility located in the Abernethy Forest. The Abernethy Forest RSPB reserve protects a habitat of Caledonian pine forest and in turn forms part of the wider Abernethy National Nature Reserve.

The birds return to the nesting site every year and the numerous binoculars and telescopes within the centre allow for effective bird watching. Visitors can also see red squirrels and other small birds feeding in front of the bird hide. A pair of ospreys have nested at the site every year from 1959 to 2019, although no chicks fledged there between 2016 and 2019. The tree which houses the nest died due to the droppings and remains of prey from the nesting birds, and in the winter of 2021 the nest (which was largely artificial) was relocated to a healthy Scots pine a few metres away. The tree canopy surrounding the nest was also lowered in an effort to make the nest site more appealing to ospreys. In 2022 a new pair of ospreys took over the new nest site and raised two young. Two chicks fledged in 2023.

The surrounding forest includes walking different paths passing by a large loch which is also known as Loch Mallachie. Some of the trails link with the Speyside way.

== See also ==
- Abernethy Forest
- Ospreys in Britain
