= Abernethy Forest =

Forest in Highland, Scotland

Abernethy National Nature Reserve
- IUCN category II (national park)
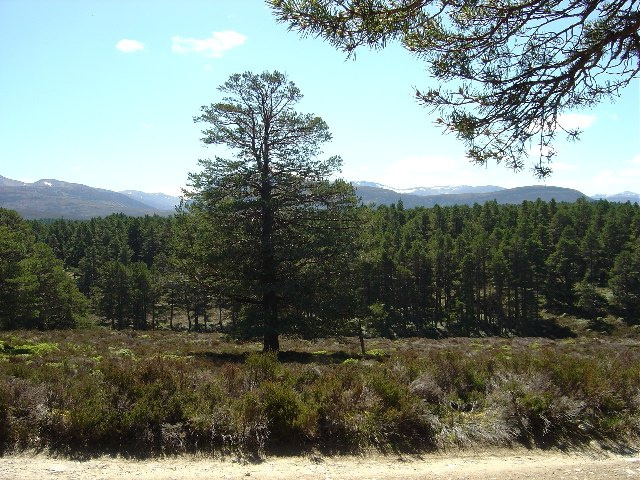
- Abernethy Forest, with the Cairngorms in the background.

- Location within Highland
- Location: Strathspey, Highland, Scotland
- Coordinates: 57°15′N 3°38′W
- Area: 12,754 ha (31,520 acres)
- Designation: NatureScot
- Established: 2007
- Owner: RSPB & NatureScot
- Website: Abernethy National Nature Reserve

Abernethy Forest is a remnant of the Caledonian Forest in Strathspey, in the Highland council area of Scotland. It lies within the Cairngorms National Park, close to the villages of Nethy Bridge, Boat of Garten, and Aviemore. The forest is an RSPB reserve, close to Loch Garten Osprey Centre, which is also owned by the RSPB. It is popular with walkers, as there are various trails throughout the reserve. The forest forms part of the wider Abernethy National Nature Reserve.

There is approximately 4,000 hectares of forest within the reserve, and just under half of this is native Caledonian pine forest. Abernethy Forest is one of the largest remaining remnant of Caledonian pine forest in Scotland. The forest is home to a variety of birds and mammals, including Scottish crossbill, red squirrel, Scottish wildcat, Scottish red deer, black grouse, crested tit and osprey. There is also a capercaillie lek.

== Abernethy National Nature Reserve ==
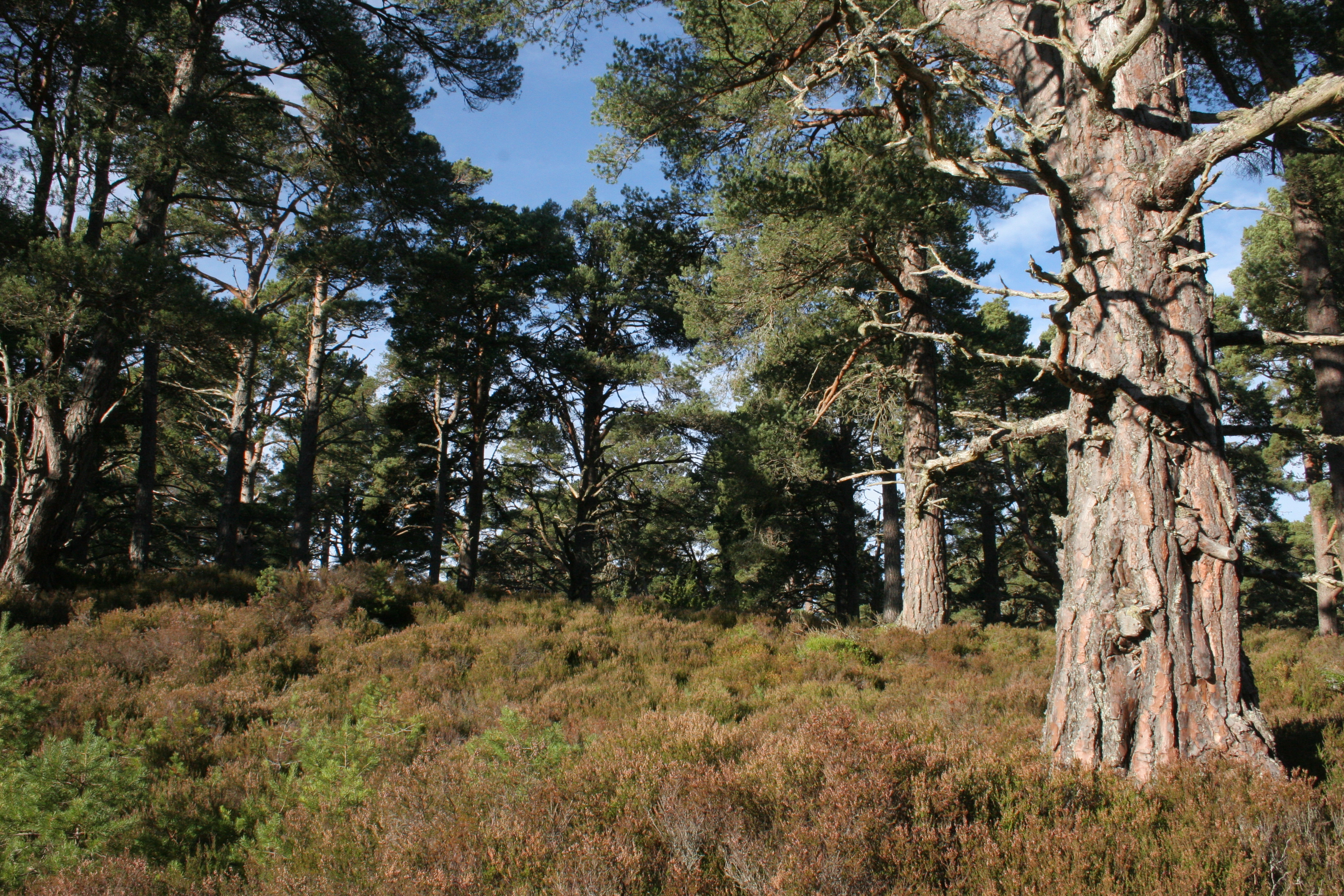
Scots pines in the forest.

The Abernethy National Nature Reserve (NNR) extends to 12,755 hectares, and encompasses the majority of Abernethy Forest along with much of the adjoining landscape. The Dell Woods section of Abernethy NNR is managed by NatureScot, whilst the rest is under the management of the Royal Society for the Protection of Birds (RSPB).

Originally the reserve covered only the core forested section of the currently designated area, and was named Abernethy Forest NNR. The Dell Woods section was added 1988, forming a 375 hectare extension to the existing NNR. In 2007, the NNR was greatly extended, becoming the new Abernethy National Nature Reserve, which extends from Abernethy Forest itself up into high Cairngorms, taking in Loch A'an and the mountains of Bynack More, Beinn Mheadhoin and the southern side of Cairn Gorm. The Abernethy NNR is classified as a Category II protected area by the International Union for Conservation of Nature.

Over 200 vascular plant species have been recorded at Abernethy NNR, including some nationally scarce species like twinflower and creeping lady's tresses. Heath cudweed is also present in the reserve, classed as an endangered species. The NNR also supports a diverse population of birds, with over 70 species recorded at the Reserve. These include the Scottish crossbill, crested tit and western capercaillie, which are all relatively rare species in Britain. Other birds present at the Reserve include buzzards, tawny owls, great spotted woodpeckers and sparrowhawks. A variety of mammals have also been recorded at the reserve, including Scottish red and roe deer; red squirrels; common pipistrelles; more elusive Eurasian otters and pine martens; and possible sightings of wildcats. NatureScot has reported fourteen species of butterfly at the Reserve, including the pearl-bordered fritillary, a UK Biodiversity Action Plan species.

== Conservation management ==
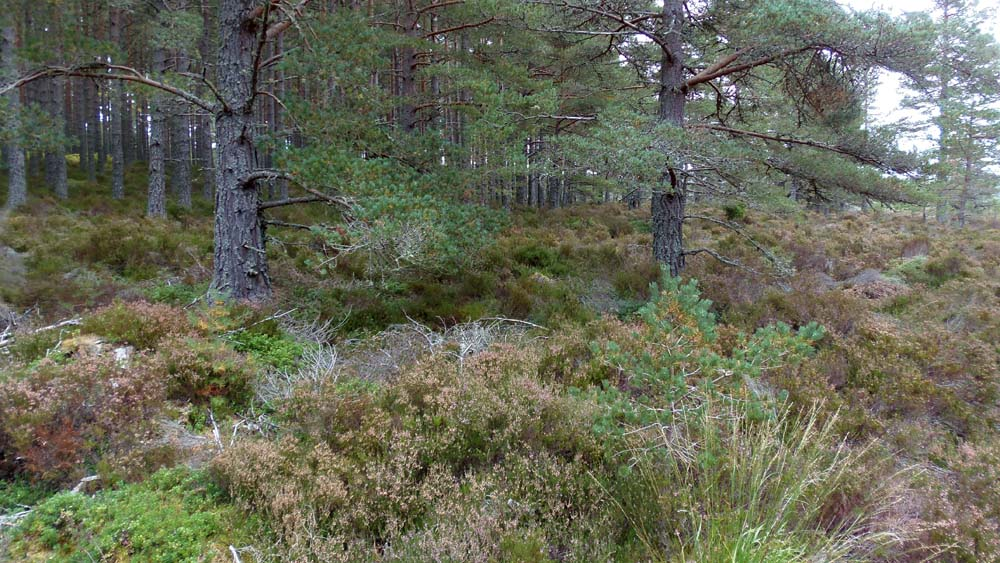
Regeneration in the northern forest.

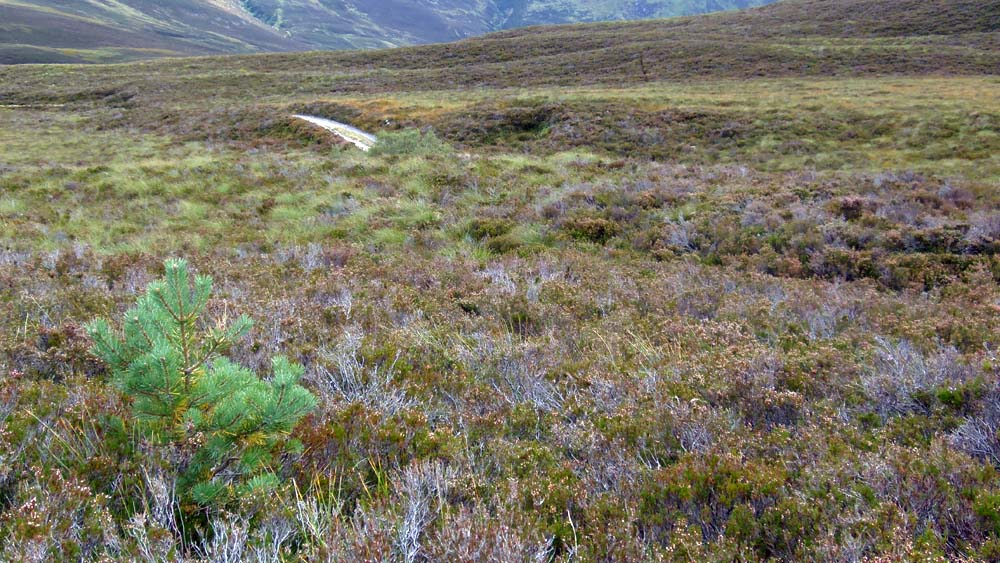
Regeneration of the forest in the southern part of the reserve.

The RSPB's primary conservation aim is to expand the area covered by the forest. On 24 August 2011 the RSPB received consent from the Forestry Commission to expand native woodland through natural regeneration and planting. Since then, they have begun the planting of 60,000 aspen, birch, juniper and willow trees within an area of approximately 590 hectares. They are also working to improve bog, moorland, scrub, rivers and mountain habitats, both within the area of the reserve and in partnership with neighbouring estates.

Historic forestry management practices have favoured the clearance of dead wood from the forest, and the RSPB are now seeking to increase the amount of lying dead wood, and dead trees and roots. To this end, on 19 October 2006, the RSPB began using explosives to blast off the crowns of nine Caledonian pine trees, between 100 and 200 years old. Referring to this use of explosives, Desmond Dugan, RSPB Site Manager at the Forest Lodge, said:

"Explosives may seem extreme but the effect will be no less catastrophic than a wind snapped, lightning struck or avalanched tree"

James Reynolds, RSPB Head of Media and Communications, said:

"We've been simply felling trees and trying to create dead wood habitats in that way before, but we don't think it allowed the process to get going quickly enough"

In 2026, parts of the Abernethy Forest were affected by a major wildfire which led to approximately 25 square kilometres (9.7 sq mi) of landscapes across the wider region being damaged.

== Other conservation designations ==
The Abernethy National Nature Reserve overlaps with several other designated areas, including:

- Abernethy Forest Site of Special Scientific Interest (SSSI)
- Abernethy Forest Special Protection Area (SPA)
- Cairngorm Lochs Ramsar Site
- Cairngorms Site of Special Scientific Interest
- Cairngorms Special Area of Conservation (SAC)
- Cairngorms Special Protection Area
- Cairngorms National Park
- Eastern Cairngorms Site of Special Scientific Interest
- Northern Corries, Cairngorms Site of Special Scientific Interest
- River Spey Special Area of Conservation

The reserve also borders two other national nature reserves, Mar Lodge Estate and Glenmore Forest.

== See also ==
- Caledonian Forest
- Loch Garten Osprey Centre
