= Alladale Wilderness Reserve =

Protected area in Highland, Scotland

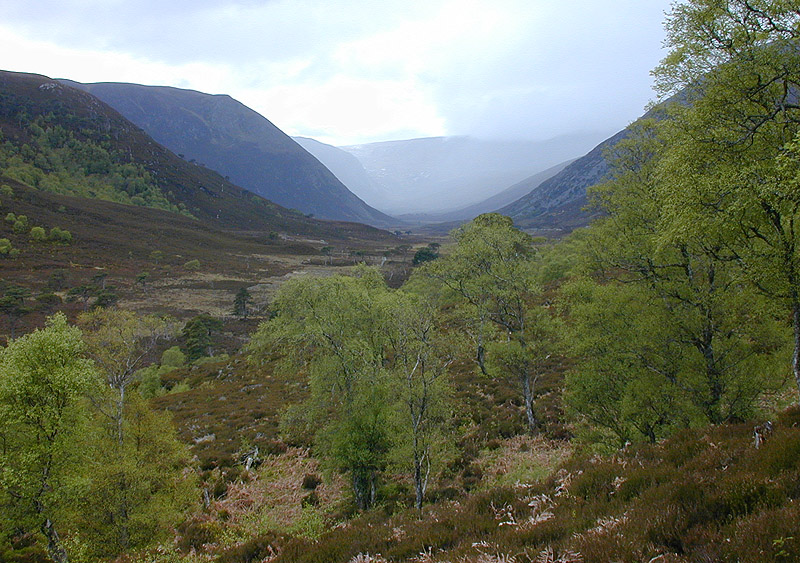
- Glen Alladale

- Location within Sutherland
- OS grid: NH439897
- Coordinates: 57.8697°N 4.6333°W
- Area: 23,000 acres (93 km^{2})
- Website: www.alladale.com

Alladale Wilderness Reserve is a 23,000-acre (93 km^{2}) highland estate in the Caledonian Forest in Sutherland, in the Scottish Highlands. The estate was purchased in 2003 by conservationist and philanthropist Paul Lister, who hopes to recreate a wooded landscape and reintroduce native animals including predators such as the Scottish wildcat and the Eurasian wolf. It is now being managed as a privately owned nature reserve that aims to promote biodiversity and associated tourism at the forefront of its mission. The idea of a wilderness reserve was inspired by Lister's visits to South Africa's game reserves, and to create an area of outstanding natural beauty, where a pack of European wolves could be released into a controlled reserve. This has been proven in South Africa, when over-grazed farmland has been returned to a more natural state.

As with all land in Scotland, there is a right of responsible access to the reserve for pursuits such as walking, cycling, horse-riding and wild camping, and the estate is an access route to the mountain Càrn Ban (845m). Ramblers and hillwalkers are concerned that the estate's plans may prevent access to grounds within the reserve. Enclosure would contravene principles of open access enshrined in the Land Reform (Scotland) Act 2003 unless stiles and gates were provided. Whilst the Ramblers support reintroductions, they see charging for access to fenced enclosures as a way for owners of large estates to subvert the Act.

== Flora and fauna ==
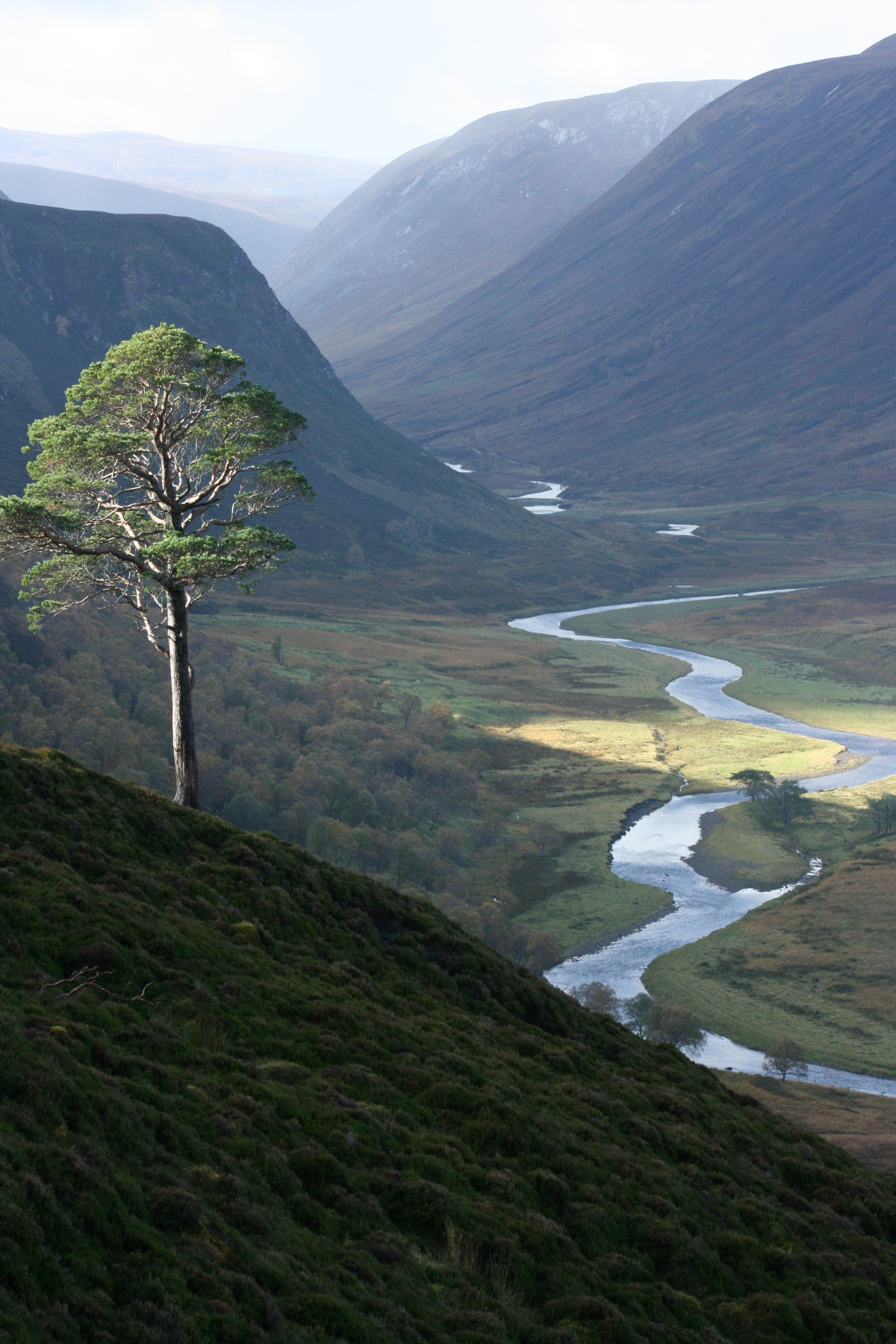
Glen Mor

The Alladale estate covers a variety of habitats, including glacial mountains, forests, rivers, and lochs. Between 2009 and 2012, 800,000 native trees (Scots pine, birch, rowan, willow, alder, aspen, holly, hazel, oak, and juniper) have been planted in protected enclosures.

Wild animals found living on the estate include red deer, roe deer, wild boar, Eurasian otter, red fox, mountain hare, European badger, pine marten, red squirrel, pipistrelle, and Britain's most threatened mammals, the water vole and Scottish wildcat. Salmon and brown trout are found in the rivers and lochs. The moors are clad in ling and bell heather and the reserve is home to three species of grouse: black grouse, red grouse and ptarmigan. Raptors and corvids include golden eagle, white-tailed eagle, osprey, buzzard, peregrine falcon, merlin, kestrel and raven.

A fold of Highland Cattle lives on the reserve as part of Alladale's conservation grazing project.

== Rewilding proposals ==
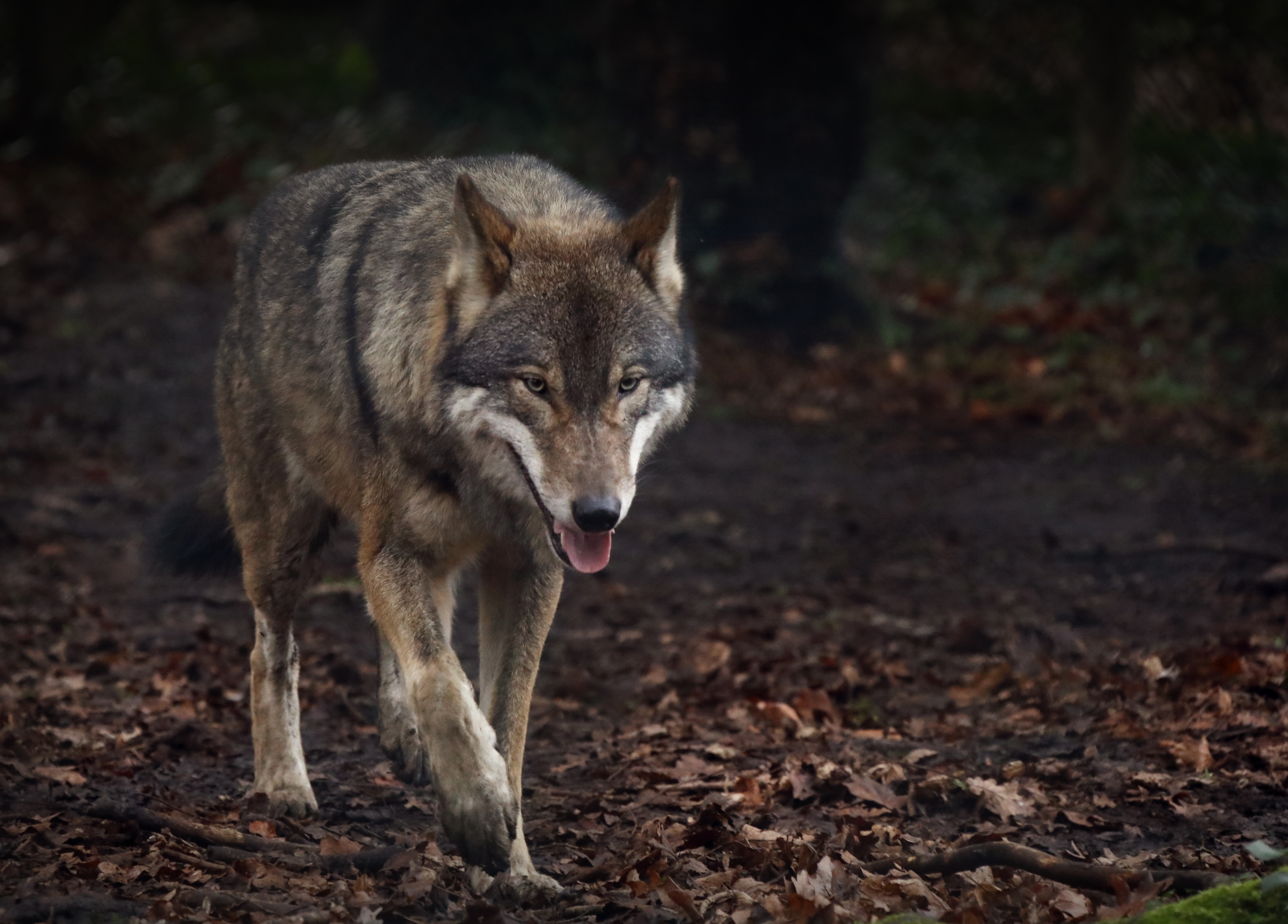
Eurasian wolf

Britain was once a largely forested landscape. It would have been home to the now extinct, large carnivores, wolves, bears, and lynx. Human habitation gradually began to deforest the countryside in order to make way for crops and livestock. Almost all the large mammals had been forced into extinction by various means. Wolves were the last to disappear in the early 1700s from Scotland. Britain 7,000 years ago would have looked more like the wildernesses still found today in parts of Romania, than the patchwork of farmland seen today. The Scottish Highlands provide the best opportunity for rewilding at scale in Britain.

Wolves would regulate deer numbers on the reserve and mitigate the browsing of young trees and encourage regeneration. This (in theory) should be a more effective way of managing deer numbers. The main benefit of the wolf project is biodiversity improvement and a more balanced ecosystem and a subsequent increase in tourism related revenues in local communities (see Yellowstone National Park), with annual visitors numbers anticipated to reach up to 20,000 per annum.

== Management ==
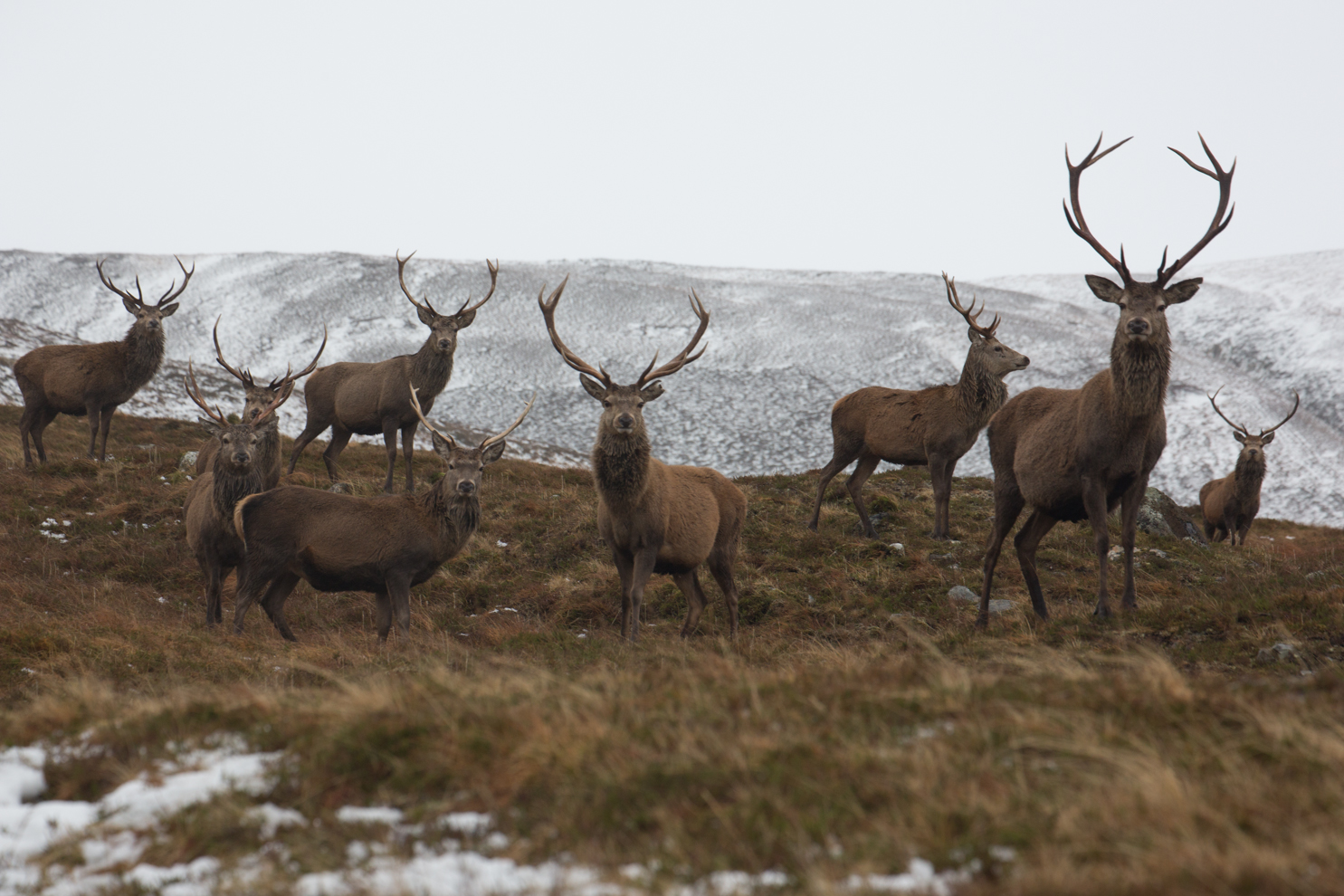
Red deer stags at Alladale

Alladale is a member of the travel industry certification protocol 'It Must Be Now'. Following the United Nations Sustainable Development Goals, this protocol uses the Earthcheck programme to benchmark all Alladale's business, operational, and rewilding efforts.

The European Nature Trust (TENT), a partner of Alladale Wilderness Reserve, is a charitable organisation which focuses on the protection of threatened wilderness areas in Europe. TENT considers that forest restoration is important "for many reasons, including supporting some of the UK’s rarest species, improving carbon sequestration, enrich the biodiversity of the rivers, improving spawning and feeding grounds for native fish and flood mitigation." TENT projects on the reserve involve the translocation of red squirrel, a Scottish wildcat breeding programme in partnership with the Royal Zoological Society Scotland, and funding of an education programme for local teenagers since 2008.

It was decided in early 2018 to stop all commercial deer stalking activities at Alladale, allowing the team of rangers to take full control of the deer cull. Deer numbers as per the start of 2020 are around 5 to 6 deer per square kilometre. 2020 saw the completion of an aquaponics vegetable garden at Alladale, while in 2023, a new education building, the Willow Centre, was opened.

== Commercial activities ==
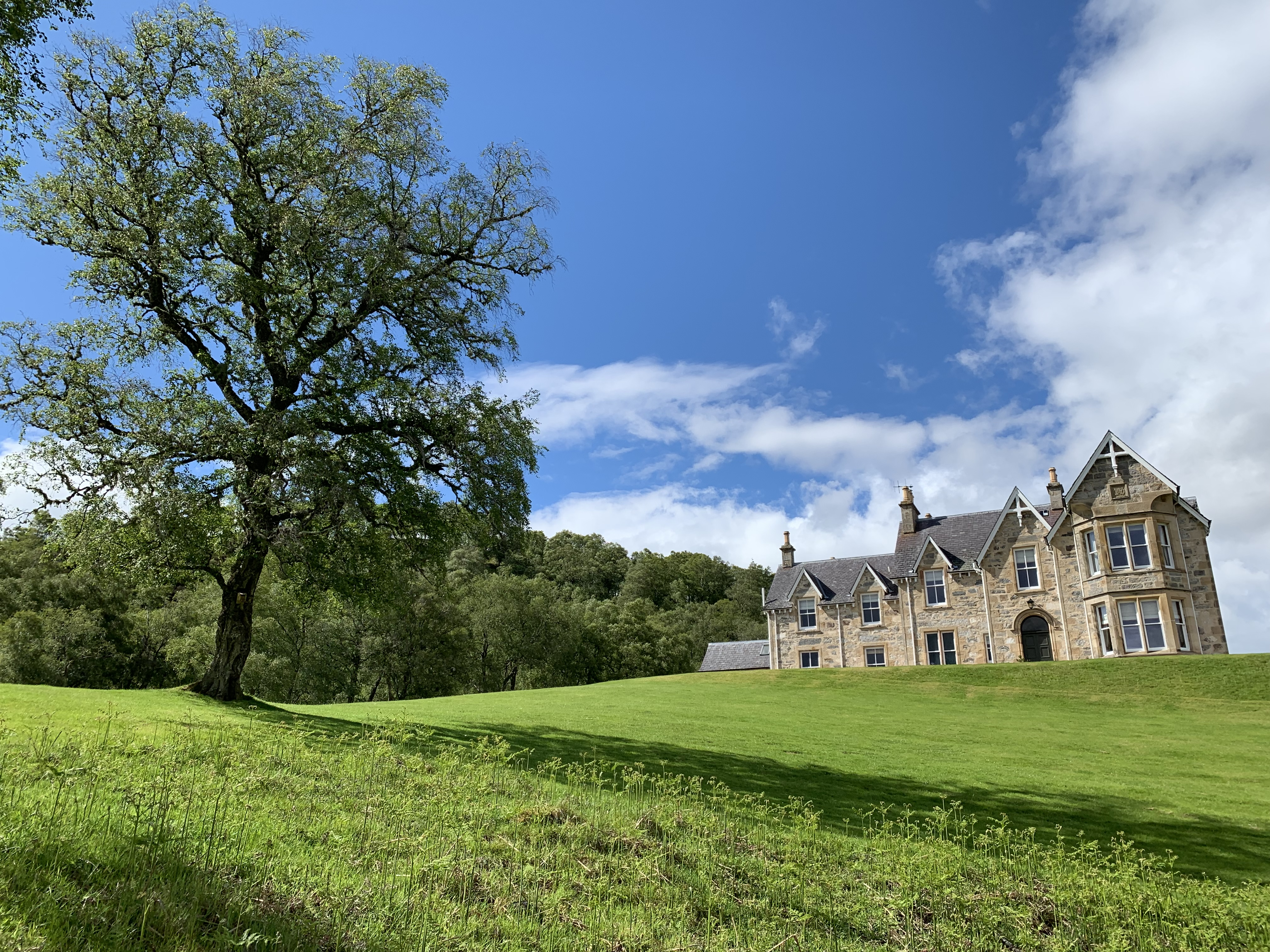
Alladale Lodge

Guests are able to book Alladale Lodge with its seven double en-suite rooms and private chef. There also are two cottages on the reserve offering accommodation to 4 and 8 guests respectively. Further into the reserve, one of Scotland's most remote buildings Deanich Lodge is available for groups up to 16. Various activities are available including guided hiking, clay pigeon shooting, angling, mountain biking, whisky tasting and safaris using off-road vehicles. Throughout the year, Alladale is home to a wide range of retreats offering yoga, mindfulness, culinary events, and nature-based transformative experiences. In winter, guests can challenge themselves to experience the Wim Hof Method.

The British adventurer and television presenter Bear Grylls has set up the Bear Grylls Survival Academy here. Participants learn such skills as self-sufficiency, trapping wild animals, fire lighting, building emergency shelters and unarmed combat.
