= Drumuillie =

Coordinates: 57.25779°N 3.74659°W

Drumuillie: Scottish Gaelic: Druim Mùillidh
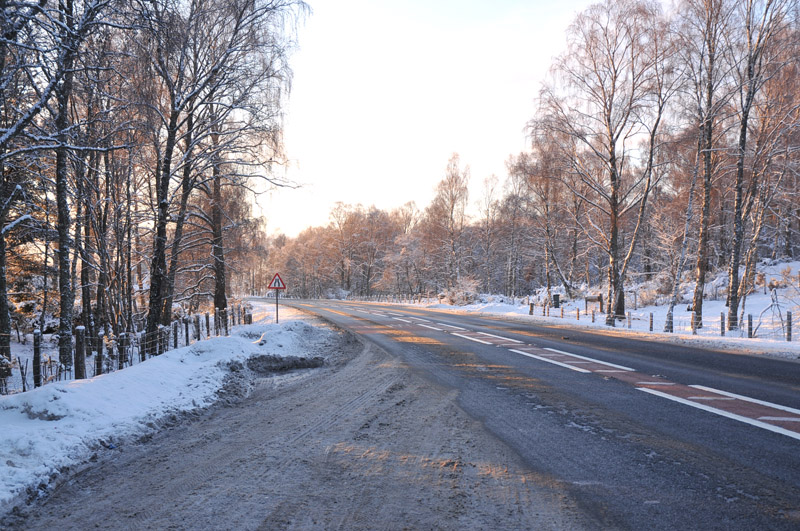
- The A95 at Drumuillie in winter

- Location within the Badenoch and Strathspey area
- OS grid reference: NH947199
- Council area: Highland
- Country: Scotland
- Sovereign state: United Kingdom
- Postcode district: PH24 3
- Police: Scotland
- Fire: Scottish
- Ambulance: Scottish

Drumuillie (Scottish Gaelic: Druim Mùillidh) is a small hamlet (or Clachan), which lies 1 mile (1.6 km) north of Boat of Garten and 10 miles (16 km) northeast of Aviemore in Inverness-shire, Scottish Highlands and is in the Scottish council area of Highland. The village is located at the centre of Abernethy Forest (to the north of Drumuillie is Deishar Wood) and just to the west of the River Spey.

== History ==
The remains of a medieval Motte-and-bailey castle known as Tom Pitlac (or the hill of Bigla or Matilda) is located to the west of Drumuillie adjacent to the Boat of Garten. The motte is a scheduled ancient monument and is believed to date to the 12th or 13th century, with an historic link in the 15th century to Bigla, a daughter of Gilbert Cumin, Lord of Glenchearnach. Associated with the castle, to the south of Drumuillie was the Spey 'miracle Stone', a stone erected in 1865 that commemorated a local legend in which the Spey river waters were divided to allow a funeral to proceed to nearby Duthil.

A small stream, Lynchurn Burn passes through the hamlet and near Lynchurn/Granish farm. The area has evidence of historic activity, including former lime kilns, a longhouse, and evidence of Pictish activity.

== Economy ==
The primary industries in the area are agriculture (a series of farm enclosures lie on the eastern edge adjacent to the railway and River Spey), tourism and forestry. A 56,000m3 capacity timber sawmill, Drumuillie Mill, is located to the west of the hamlet. An older sawmill existed near the current mill but stopped working in 1930 and was converted to a private house.

== Transport ==
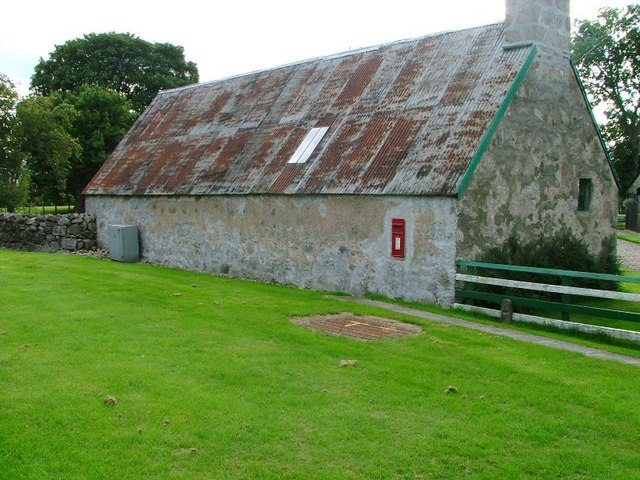
Drumillie postbox

Drumuillie lies on the A95 road and was located along the earlier route of the military road to Grantown-on-Spey built under the direction of General George Wade. The Strathspey railway, a working heritage line, passes through Drumuillie, lying between Broomhill railway station and the Boat of Garten railway station. The nearest mainline station is Aviemore railway station.

== Education ==
Drumuillie has no school; the nearest primary school is Deshar Primary School in Boat of Garten.
