= Chestnut Centre =

Wildlife park near Chapel-en-le-Frith, Derbyshire

- Location within Derbyshire
- Interactive map of Chestnut Centre
- Type: wildlife park
- Location: near Chapel-en-le-Frith, Derbyshire, UK
- Coordinates: 53°20′05″N 1°53′15″W
- Opened: 1984
- Closed: 2017
- Website: https://www.chestnutcentre.co.uk/

The Chestnut Centre (or in full, Chestnut Centre Otter, Owl and Wildlife Park) was a wildlife park near Chapel-en-le-Frith, Derbyshire, UK. It opened in 1984, and closed in 2017.

== History ==
Carol and Roger Heap, the owners of the park, started looking after a pair of Asian small-clawed otters in the 1970s. In 1981, they were able to buy Chestnut Farm, which was adjacent to their home. Their eldest son was also given a pair of tawny owls to look after around the same time. They opened the park in 1984. In the late 1990s, with Roger's retirement, it was operated more as a business with marketing and visits.

It had around 45,000 visitors per year, including 8,000 on school trips. It also had a tea room and souvenir shop.

The centre was the first place where giant otters were bred in captivity. it also was involved with breeding programmes for Scottish wildcats, European polecats, and Eurasian otters. It had more than 10 species of deer, four species of otter, and pine martens and Scottish wildcats.

The park closed at the end of 2017, after 30 years of operation, when the Heaps semi-retired. All animals were relocated to the New Forest Wildlife Park, which is operated by one of their sons, except for two species of owl which went to the National Centre for Birds of Prey at Duncombe Park, operated by their other son. This was because there was little room for expansion at the Chestnut Centre, but there was at the New Forest.

The centre was put up for sale in 2021, for an asking price of £850,000, including the Grade II listed house, a barn that was formerly used for classrooms, and 1.75 acres of land (with 27 acres sold separately). It also had planning permission to convert the barn to a house, and build an earth sheltered Eco House.
