= Boat of Garten =

Village in Scotland

Coordinates: 57.25129°N 3.74247°W

Boat of Garten: Scottish Gaelic: Coit a' Ghartain
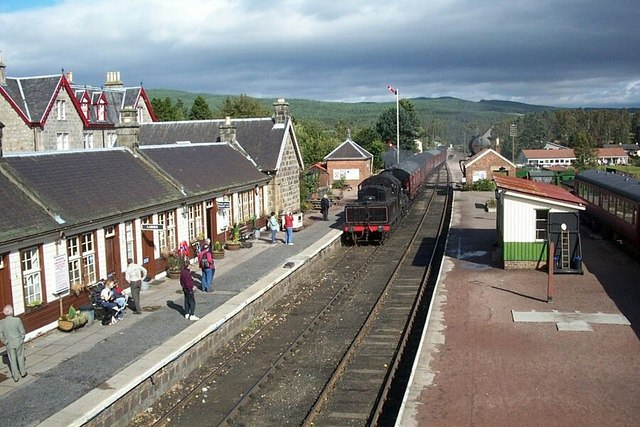

- Location within the Badenoch and Strathspey area
- OS grid reference: NH949191
- Council area: Highland
- Country: Scotland
- Sovereign state: United Kingdom
- Post town: BOAT OF GARTEN
- Postcode district: PH24
- Dialling code: 01479
- Police: Scotland
- Fire: Scottish
- Ambulance: Scottish
- UK Parliament: Moray West, Nairn and Strathspey
- Scottish Parliament: Inverness and Nairn

Boat of Garten (Scottish Gaelic: Coit a' Ghartain; originally: Garten) is a small village and post town in Badenoch and Strathspey, Highland, Scotland. In 1951, the population was less than 400; in 1971, it was almost 500; in 1981, it was almost 700, and the same in 2001.

== Toponymy ==
Boat of Garten is also known informally as "Osprey village", due to the significant population of ospreys in the area.

=== Etymology ===
The current name of the settlement, Boat of Garten, refers to the nearby site of the old ferry over the River Spey. However, Pont's map of 1600 and Roy's map of 1750 named the location simply "Garten".

== Geography and transportation ==
Boat of Garten is located between Aviemore and Grantown-on-Spey. It lies northeast of Aviemore, just north of Auchgourish and east of Kinveachy. Grantown is 7 1/2 miles (12 kilometres) away. Loch Garten lies to the southeast of the village. To the east of the village is the small settlement of Drumuillie.

Situated at an elevation of 220 metres (720 ft) above sea level, it lies 500 metres (1,600 feet) from the River Spey in the Cairngorms National Park. Being close to the Cairngorm Mountains. it is in view of the Lairig Ghru and the northern Braeriach corries.

The area between Boat of Garten and Loch Garten is within Abernethy Forest National Nature Reserve, Boat of Garten being on the forest fringe.

Boat of Garten is also an intermediate station between Aviemore and Broomhill on the Strathspey Railway, originally part of the Great North of Scotland Railway, now run by the Strathspey Railway Company.

== Flora and fauna ==
Alyssum alyssoides, Cerastium arvense, Vaccinium vitis-idaea and Koeleria macrantha are found in the village, as are Juniperus communis, Arctostaphylos uva-ursi, Empetrum nigrum and Ptilium crista-castrensis. Rare fungi include Amanita virosa, Leucocortinarius bulbiger, Pholiota spumosa, Tapinella atrotomentosa, Cantharellula umbonata, Sarcodon imbricatus, Dentipellis fragilis and Hydnellum scrobiculatum. Boat of Garten has also significant population of Ospreys.

== Landmarks ==
St Columba's Church was built in the summer of 1900, at a cost of £820, and the church hall was added in 1934.

The village is also renowned for the nearby RSPB reserve at Loch Garten, well known for ospreys. It is approximately 1 mile (1.6 km) to the east.

The village features a golf course, originally designed by James Braid. Built in 1898, it was expanded in 1931. It has been ranked as one of the top 35 courses in Scotland.

The Community Company created a garden in 2002 and in 2013 two sculptures and an information hub commissioned by the community were installed in the Station Square, adjacent to the Community Garden.

The remains of a medieval motte-and-bailey castle known as Tom Pitlac (or the hill of Bigla or Matilda) is located to the east of the village, adjacent to Drumuillie. It is a scheduled ancient monument, and is believed to date from the 12th or 13th century, with a historic link in the 15th century to Bigla, a daughter of Gilbert Cumin, Lord of Glenchearnach. Associated with the castle, to the south of Drumuillie was the Spey 'Miracle Stone', which commemorated a local legend in which the Spey river waters supposedly divided to allow a funeral to proceed to nearby Duthil. The commemoration stone was said to have been erected as a result of the Disruption of 1843. It was inscribed by one William Grant, and was erected in 1865 in memory of the wife of Patrick Grant. But as it was associated with scandal, the district residents destroyed it and threw it into the river.

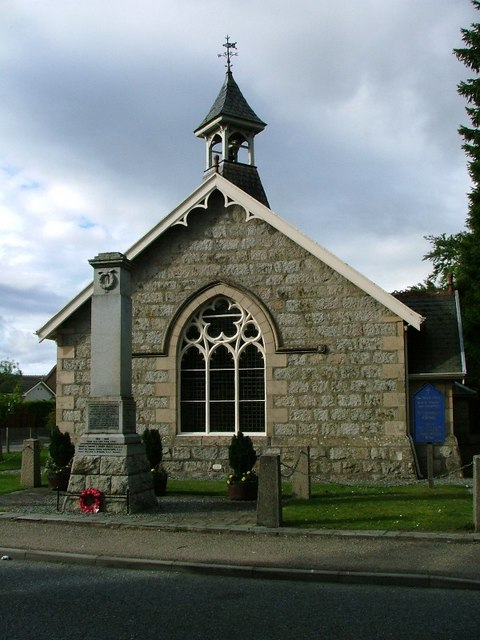
St Columba's Church and War Memorial

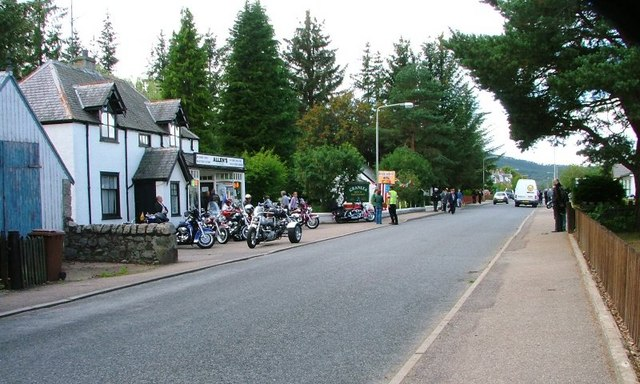
Deshar Road, Boat of Garten
