= New Forest Wildlife Park =

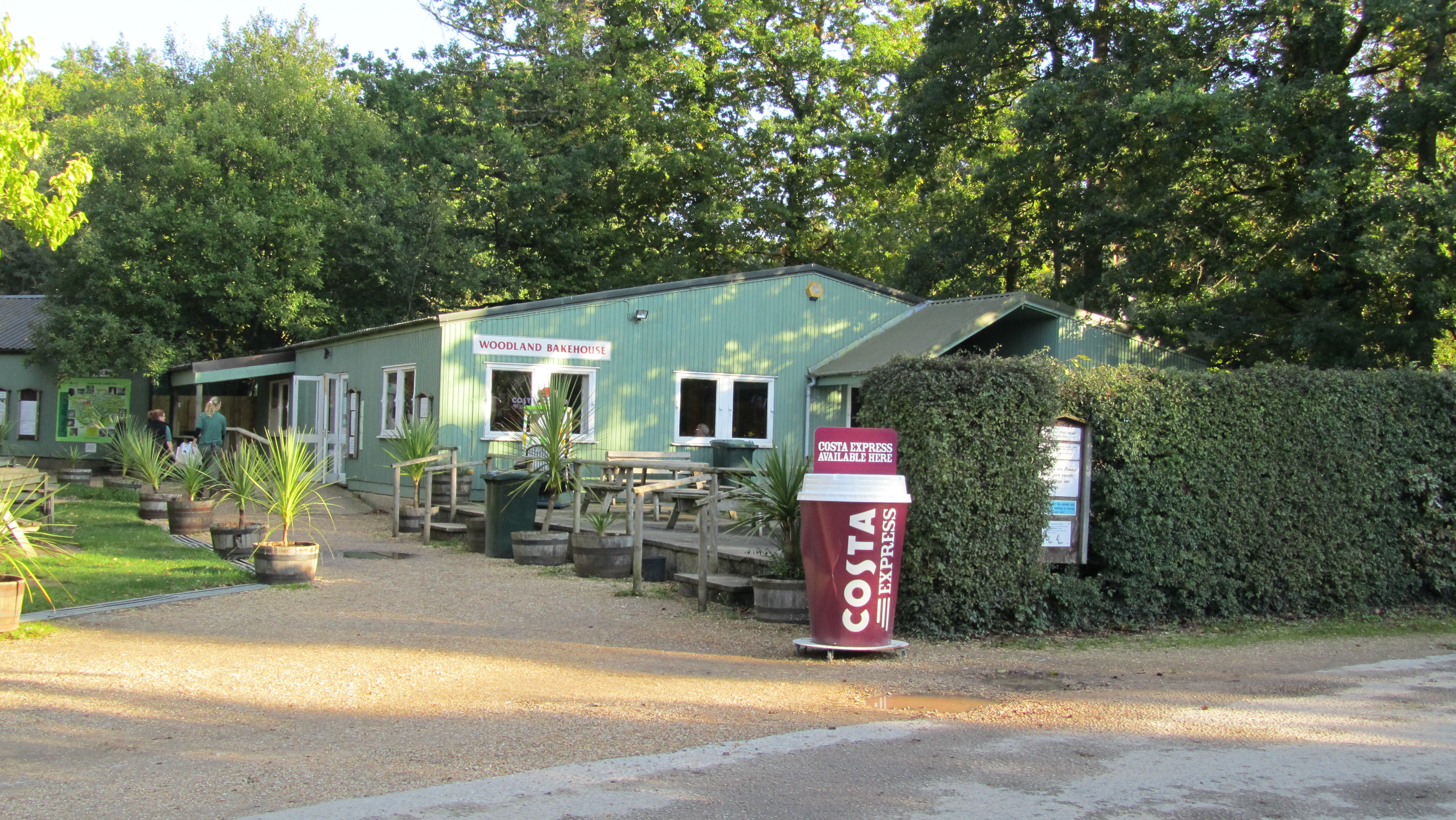
- Interactive map of New Forest Wildlife Park
- 50.8860°N 1.4983°W
- Date opened: 1998
- Location: Deerleap Lane, Longdown, Near Ashurst, Hampshire, England
- Land area: 25 acres (100,000 m^{2})
- No. of species: 49 (2011)
- Website: http://www.newforestwildlifepark.co.uk

The New Forest Wildlife Park (formerly The New Forest Otter, Owl and Wildlife Conservation Park) is located on the edge of The New Forest close to the towns of Ashurst and Lyndhurst. The park specialises in native and past-native wildlife of Britain and otters and owls from around the globe, housing four species of the former and ten of the latter.

The park is recognised as the UK's leading institution in the rescue and rehabilitation of sick, injured and orphaned wild otters, along with the rehabilitation of other wildlife such as owls, deer and foxes in similar situations, and it is involved in several conservation projects, including breeding programmes for endangered native species such as Scottish wildcats, water voles and harvest mice.

== History ==
The site was opened as The New Forest Butterfly Farm in 1981, and the main glasshouse complex that formed the farm still stands today. That venture was closed in the early 1990s, and it was taken over by entertainment company Vardon Plc. (which also owned the UK's numerous Sea Life Centres), who turned the site into New Forest Nature Quest, a collection specialising in native wildlife. However, when Vardon was taken over by Merlin Entertainments in 1998, the park was put up for sale. Some of the animal collection was taken over by a company called 'Nature Quest' owned by Kenneth West, that eventually was housed at the newly created Wildwood Discovery Park in Kent. The remainder of the collection was taken over by Roger Heap who had already been running the Chestnut Centre, an otter and owl specialised collection in Derbyshire, since 1984 when he took over ownership of the park.

Along with the many native animals that Nature Quest had fixed into the park, the Heap family added a large collection of otters and owls on par with the Derbyshire Park and The New Forest Otter, Owl and Wildlife Conservation Park was born. Twelve years later, the park was re-branded as The New Forest Wildlife Park to emphasise the large and expanding collection of native and past-native wildlife in addition to the many otters and owls.

== Animals at the park ==
The main bulk of the collection consists of animals that are or were at one time native to Britain, along with various species of otters and owls from around the globe and tropical butterflies in a walk-through exhibit that calls back to the park's early days as a butterfly farm. These include:

- Eurasian otter
- Asian small-clawed otter
- Smooth-coated otter
- Giant otter
- European badger
- European pine marten
- European polecat
- Ferret
- Eurasian wolf
- Red fox
- Eurasian lynx
- Scottish wildcat
- Red-necked wallaby
- European hedgehog
- House mouse
- Eurasian harvest mouse
- Wisent
- Wild boar
- Red deer
- European fallow deer
- Sika deer
- Common European adder

The Park's owl species include:

- Snowy owl
- Tawny owl
- Barn owl
- Little owl
- Eurasian eagle-owl
- Verreaux's eagle-owl
- Brown wood owl
- Great horned owl
- Mackinder's eagle owl
- Ural owl
- Southern white-faced owl
- Northern hawk-owl

== Facilities ==
The Woodland Bakehouse serves as the Park's restaurant and tearoom, and is open both to visitors and non-visitors to the park. The next-door Wildlife Gift Shop sells souvenirs and local produce, and during winter months is relocated to the Bakehouse on a smaller scale.
