= Clashindarroch Forest =

Forest in Aberdeenshire, Scotland

Coordinates: 57.32361°N 2.95647°W

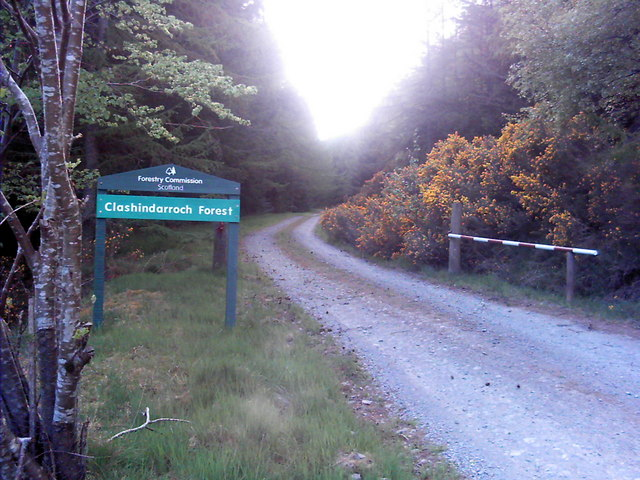
An entry track into the east side of the forest

Clashindarroch Forest is possibly the largest forest in Aberdeenshire, situated to the south-west of the market town of Huntly. It is managed by Forestry and Land Scotland. It is the location of a series of Nordic Skiing trails managed by the Nordic Ski Centre.

The forest is home to a small Scottish wildcat population, a species considered to be at the verge of extinction.

In 2006, a proposal was made to construct a 47 turbine windfarm in the forest which was the subject of a public inquiry in May 2006. Construction of the 18 Senvion MM82 turbine 36.9MW Clashindarroch Wind Farm phase 1 project was completed in 2015. In 2020 Vattenfall sought planning permission for a 77MW phase 2 development of 14 turbines.
