= Achnaconeran =

Coordinates: 57.22514°N 4.62474°W

Achnaconeran: Scottish Gaelic: Achadh nan Conbhairean
- Location within the Inverness area
- OS grid reference: NH416179
- Council area: Highland
- Country: Scotland
- Sovereign state: United Kingdom
- Postcode district: IV63 7
- Police: Scotland
- Fire: Scottish
- Ambulance: Scottish
- UK Parliament: Inverness, Skye and West Ross-shire
- Scottish Parliament: Skye, Lochaber and Badenoch

Achnaconeran is a remote crofting settlement in the Inverness committee area of Highland and is in the Scottish council area of Highland. Achnaconeran is on the northern bank of Loch Ness about 22 miles (35 km) south-west from Inverness and 6 miles (9.7 km) north-east from Fort Augustus.
