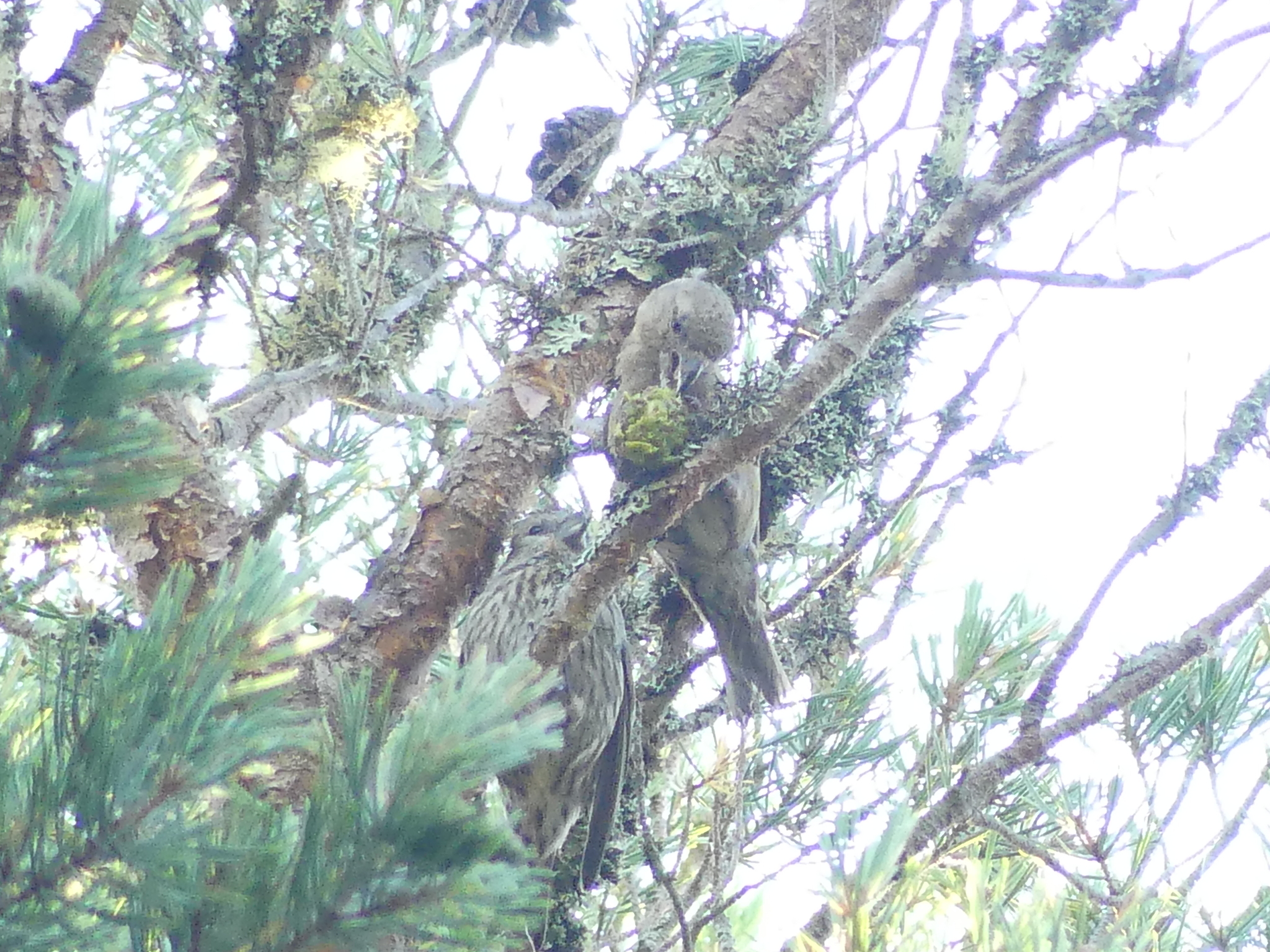

Conservation status
- Least Concern (IUCN 3.1)

Scientific classification
- Kingdom: Animalia
- Phylum: Chordata
- Class: Aves
- Order: Passeriformes
- Family: Fringillidae
- Subfamily: Carduelinae
- Genus: Loxia
- Species: L. scotica

Binomial name
- Loxia scotica Hartert, 1904

= Scottish crossbill =

Species of bird

The Scottish crossbill (Loxia scotica) is a small passerine bird in the finch family Fringillidae. It is endemic to the Caledonian Forests of Scotland.

The genus name Loxia is from Ancient Greek loxos, 'crosswise', and scotica is Latin for 'Scottish'. The Scottish Gaelic name for a crossbill is Cam-ghob, which means 'crooked beak'.

== History and current status ==
The British Ornithologists Union first classed the Scottish crossbill as a separate and distinct species in 1980, but some ornithologists believed there was insufficient scientific research for its status. It was considered to be possibly a race of either the red crossbill or the parrot crossbill, both of which also occur in the Caledonian Forest.

RSPB research showed that Scottish crossbills have quite distinct flight and excitement calls from other crossbills – some even stated they have "Scottish accents".

Research in Scotland has shown that red, parrot and Scottish crossbills are reproductively isolated, and the diagnostic calls and bill dimensions have not been lost. They are therefore good species.

The population is thought to be approximately 20,000 birds. It nests in pines or other conifers, laying 2-5 eggs.

The Scottish crossbill breeds in the native Scots pine (Pinus sylvestris), Caledonian forests of the Scottish Highlands, but often also in forestry plantations of exotic conifers, notably Larch (Larix decidua and L. kaempferi) and Lodgepole pine (Pinus contorta).

This species of crossbill is resident, and is not known to migrate. It will form flocks outside the breeding season, often mixed with other crossbills.

== Description ==
The crossbills are characterised by the mandibles crossing at their tips, which gives the group its English name. They are specialist feeders on conifer cones, and their unusual bill shape is an adaptation to assist the extraction of the seeds from the cone. The Scottish crossbill appears to be a specialist feeder on the cones of pines (Scots pine and Lodgepole pine) and larch.

Adult males tend to be red or orange in colour, and females green or yellow, but there is much variation.

The Scottish crossbill is extremely difficult to separate from the red and parrot, and plumage distinctions are negligible. The head and bill size is intermediate between and overlapping extensively with the other two, and extreme care is needed to identify this species. The metallic jip call is probably the best indicator, but even this needs to be recorded and analysed on a sonogram to confirm the identity.

=== Bill structure ===
According to a lengthy scientific study by the Royal Society for the Protection of Birds (RSPB), 'Celtic' crossbills differ in bill size from other crossbill species found in Great Britain, and they have also been found to have a distinct Scottish accent or call, thought to be the method used by the birds to make sure that, especially given the physical similarities with other crossbills, they only attract and pair with potential mates of the same species.

The most important evidence to come from the RSPB's long term study in the Highlands focused on discovering if the birds mate with those with a similar bill size and call, and whether young Scottish crossbills inherit their bill sizes from their parents.

Results showed that, of over 40 pairs of different types of crossbills caught, almost all matched closely for bill size and calls, so the different types of crossbills were behaving as distinct species.

=== Calls ===
The calls can be distinguished by sonograms. This provides the basis for a method to survey crossbills and, for the first time, gain a clear picture of their numbers and distribution in Scotland and help in any conservation programmes for the race.

== Conservation ==
The first survey of Scottish crossbills was undertaken in 2008.

Despite lacking data for population trends, British Birds places the crossbill on their Amber list for conservation concern on the basis of it being an endemic species and therefore of 'international importance'. A 2017 report by the British Trust for Ornithology identified the crossbill as being at high risk of extinction.

Breeding populations exist at Corrimony Nature Reserve, and Loch Garten Nature Reserve, one of the United Kingdom's most protected nature sites.

One of the main threats to the crossbill's habitat is wood and pulp plantations, plus underplanting conifers and grazing pressure.

The main active conservation initiative is the implementation of the EU's Biodiversity action plan, which seeks to protect the numerous species of birds throughout the EU. Further studies are needed to establish the species of trees Scottish crossbills are best adapted to, as well as population trends. It has also been suggested to prevent any further loss of habitat, and further restrict red deer grazing.
