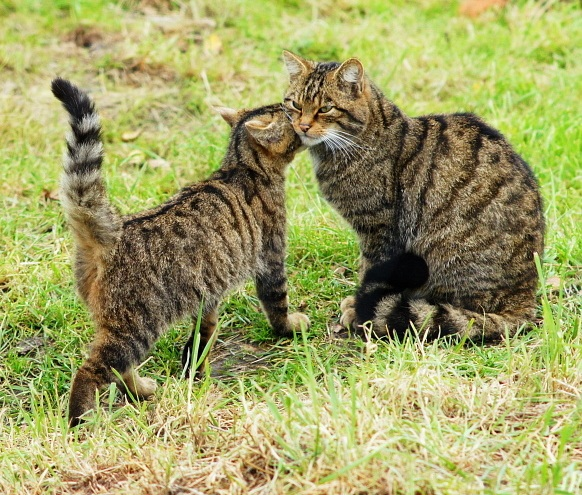
- Female and kitten at the British Wildlife Centre

Conservation status
- CITES Appendix II

Scientific classification
- Kingdom: Animalia
- Phylum: Chordata
- Class: Mammalia
- Order: Carnivora
- Family: Felidae
- Genus: Felis
- Species: F. silvestris
- Subspecies: F. s. silvestris
- Population: Scottish wildcat

Synonyms
- Felis grampia Miller 1907; Felis silvestris grampia Miller 1912

= Scottish wildcat =

Small wild cat

The Scottish wildcat is a European wildcat (Felis silvestris silvestris) population in Scotland. It was once widely distributed across Great Britain, but the population has declined drastically since the turn of the 20th century due to habitat loss and persecution. It is now limited to northern and eastern Scotland. Camera-trapping surveys carried out in the Scottish Highlands between 2010 and 2013 revealed that the Scottish wildcat lives foremost in mixed woodland. Since individuals sampled in recent years showed a high level of hybridisation with domestic cats (Felis catus), the wildcat population is thought to be functionally extinct in the wild. It is therefore listed as critically endangered in the United Kingdom.

== Taxonomy ==
Felis grampia was the scientific name proposed in 1907 by Gerrit Smith Miller Jr. who first described the skin and the skull of a wildcat specimen from Scotland. He argued that this male specimen from Invermoriston was the same size as the European wildcat (Felis silvestris), but differed by a darker fur with more pronounced black markings and black soles of the paws. In 1912, Miller considered it a subspecies, using Felis silvestris grampia after reviewing 22 skins from Scotland in the collection of the Natural History Museum, London. When Reginald Innes Pocock reviewed the taxonomy of the genus Felis in the late 1940s, he had more than 40 Scottish wildcat specimens in the collection of the Museum at his disposal. He recognized Felis silvestris grampia as a valid taxon.

Results of morphological and genetic analyses indicate that the Scottish wildcat descended from the European wildcat. The Great Britain population became isolated from the continental population about 7,000 to 9,000 years ago due to a rise of sea level after the last glacial maximum. Since 2017, the Cat Classification Task Force of the Cat Specialist Group recognizes Felis silvestris silvestris as the valid scientific name for all European wildcat populations and F. s. grampia as a synonym, arguing that it is doubtful that the Scottish wildcat is sufficiently distinct to accord it separate subspecific status.

== Characteristics ==
The male Scottish wildcat has a head-to-body length ranging from 578 to 636 mm (22.8 to 25.0 in) with 305–355 mm (12.0–14.0 in) long tails and of females from 504 to 572 mm (19.8 to 22.5 in) with 280–341 mm (11.0–13.4 in) long tails. Condylobasal length of skulls of females varies from 82 to 88 mm (3.2 to 3.5 in) and of males from 88 to 99 mm (3.5 to 3.9 in). Males weigh 3.77–7.26 kg (8.3–16.0 lb), while females are smaller at 2.35–4.68 kg (5.2–10.3 lb).

The Scottish wildcat's fur is distinctly striped with a solid tabby patterning. Its ringed tail is bushy with a black tip. It differs from the domestic cat by stripes on the cheeks and hind legs, the absence of spots, white markings and coloured backs of the ears. It is heavier than a domestic cat, has longer limb bones and a more robust skull. It is also larger in body size, but with a shorter gastrointestinal tract.

== Distribution and habitat ==
The Scottish wildcat has been present in Britain since the early Holocene, when the British Isles were connected to continental Europe via Doggerland. It was once common throughout all of Great Britain. In southern England, it likely became locally extinct during the 16th century. By the mid-19th century, its range had declined to west-central Wales and Northumberland due to persecution, and by 1880 to western and northern Scotland. By 1915, it occurred only in northwestern Scotland. Following the decreasing number of gamekeepers after World War I and a re-forestation programme, the wildcat population increased again to its current range. Urbanisation and industrialisation prevented further expansion to the southern parts of Scotland.

Its current distribution includes the Cairngorms, the Black Isle, Aberdeenshire, the Angus Glens and Ardnamurchan. It lives in wooded habitats, shrubland and near forest edges, but avoids heather moorland and gorse scrub. It prefers areas away from agriculturally used land and avoids snow deeper than 10 cm (3.9 in).

== Behaviour and ecology ==
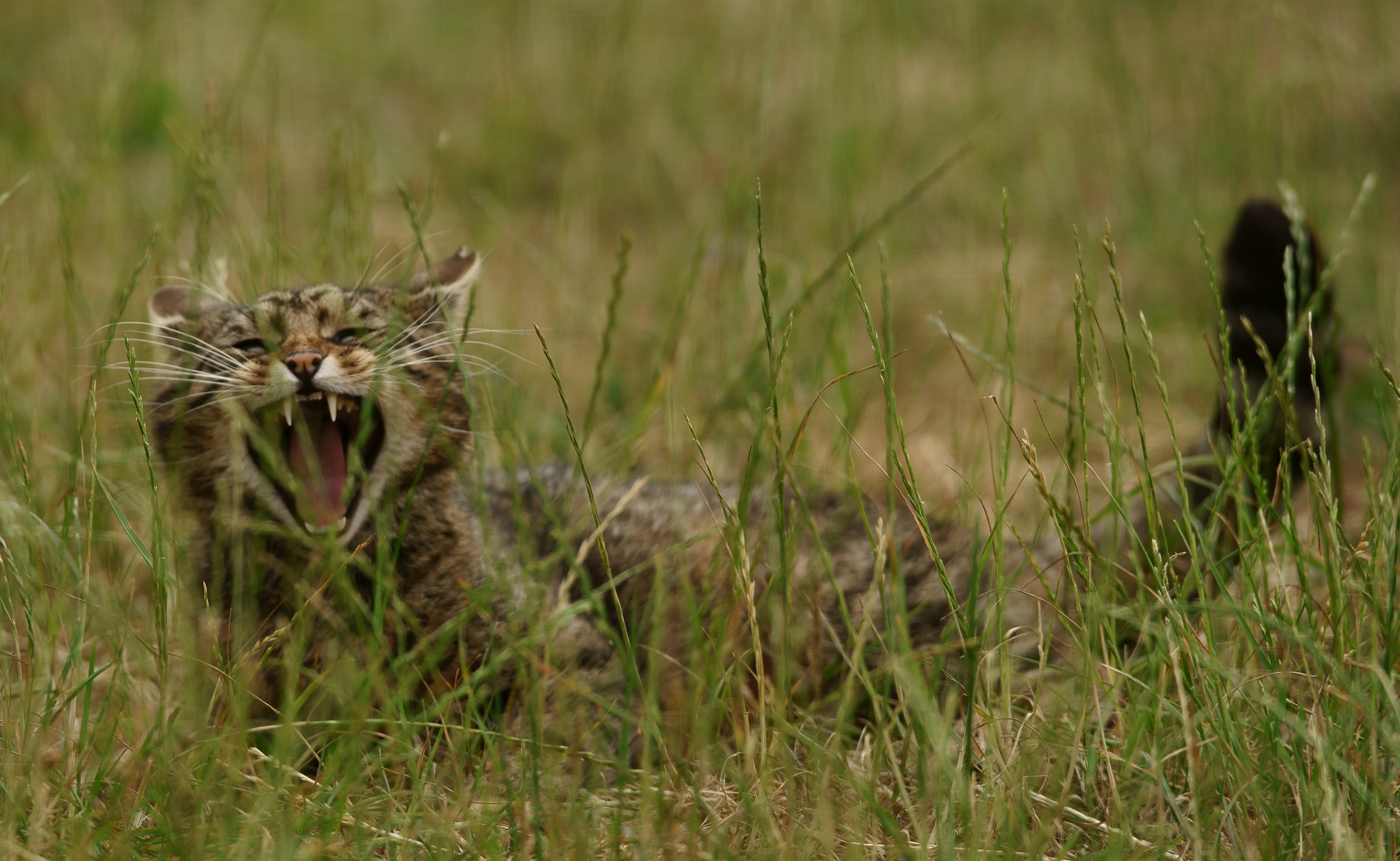
Scottish wildcat shows its fangs, 2013

Between March 1995 and April 1997, thirty-one Scottish wildcats were fitted with radio-collars in the area of the Angus Glens and tracked for at least five months. In all seasons, they were most active by night with activity decreasing at low moonlight and in windy weather. Home ranges of male wildcats overlap with home ranges of one or more females, whereas female ranges rarely overlap. Adult cats maintain larger territories than juveniles. They mark and defend their home ranges using scent marking through their scat. Home range size in and around Cairngorms National Park was estimated at 2.44 to 3.8 km^{2} (0.94 to 1.47 sq mi).

The wildcats mainly prey on European rabbits (Oryctolagus cuniculus) and field voles (Microtus agrestis). Scats collected in Drumtochty Forest and two more sites in the Scottish Highlands contained remains of rabbits, wood mice (Apodemus sylvaticus), field and bank voles (Myodes glareolus) and birds. Any uneaten remnants of a kill will be buried in a cache to save for later.

=== Reproduction ===
Male Scottish wildcats reach sexual maturity at around 10 months of age and the female at an age of less than 12 months. A female had one estrous in early March and a litter was born in early May after a gestation period of 63–68 days. Another estrous occurred about one month later and the second litter was born in August. Kittens open their eyes at 10–13 days old; their eyes are initially blue and change to green around seven weeks of age.

In the wild, mating occurs between January and March. Litter size varies from one to eight kittens, with a mean litter size of 4.3 young. Females rarely give birth in winter. Kittens are born in a den, which is hidden within a cairn, among brush piles and under tree roots. They begin learning how to hunt at 10–12 weeks and are fully weaned by 14 weeks of age. They leave their mothers around six months of age. Kitten mortality during the winter of 1975−1978 was high; most starved.

Captive Scottish wildcats have lived for 15 years, but the lifespan in the wild is much shorter due to road accidents and disease transmitted from feral domestic cats.

== Threats ==
It is listed as Critically Endangered in the United Kingdom and is threatened by hybridisation with domestic cats; continued threats to the Scottish wildcat population include habitat loss, and being hunted as vermin.

An extended controversy in Aberdeenshire pits Swedish energy firm Vattenfall Wind Power against the Scottish wildcat. The Scottish government considers Clashindarroch Forest outside the town of Huntly to be a "wildcat wonderland." The Scottish Wildcat Association states that the energy giant's efforts to raze the old-growth forest for their wind farms would wipe out the cats there, which number at least 35 as of 2018, a substantial proportion of the known surviving population. As of 2021, an online petition circulated by activists had garnered more than 800,000 signatures in support of protecting the forest. Vattenfall, however, has claimed that the company poses no threat.

Hybridisation with outdoor-roaming domestic cats is regarded as a threat to the wildcat population. It is likely that all Scottish wildcats today have at least some domestic cat ancestry. Unvaccinated and infected domestic cats may also transmit lethal diseases to the Scottish wildcat, such as feline calicivirus, feline coronavirus, feline foamy virus, feline herpesvirus, feline immunodeficiency virus and feline leukemia virus.

Scottish wildcats have also often been killed to protect game bird species, and were once widely considered vermin.

== Conservation ==
VOA report about conservation of the Scottish wildcat from 2016

The Scottish wildcat was given protected status under the United Kingdom's Wildlife and Countryside Act 1981. Since 2007, it has been listed in the U.K. Biodiversity Action Plan as a priority species.

The Scottish Wildcat Conservation Action Plan was developed by the Scottish Wildcat Conservation Action Group, which set national action priorities and defined responsibilities of agencies and funding priorities for the group's conservation efforts between 2013 and 2019. Its implementation is coordinated by Scottish Natural Heritage. In the wild, efforts to conserve wildcats include neutering feral cats and euthanizing diseased feral cats to prevent hybridization and the spread of disease.

By 2014, the project members had researched nine potential action areas, settling on six, which were considered as having the highest likelihood of conservation success, with work planned beginning in 2015: Morvern, Strathpeffer, Strathbogie, Strathavon, Dulnain and the Angus Glens. An area of the remote and largely undisturbed Ardnamurchan Peninsula was designated a Scottish wildcat sanctuary.

In 2018, the official efforts fell under the auspices of Scottish Wildcat Action, a coalition including government and academic institutions, with an updated list of five priority areas: Strathbogie, the Angus glens, Northern Strathspey, Morvern and Strathpeffer. As of 2019, the wildcat population in Scotland was considered no longer viable and at the verge of extinction.

In 2023, NatureScot approved a license for release of captive-bred wildcats into the Cairngorms region during the summer of that year. The first of 19 cats were released in early June 2023. In spring 2024, at least 2 of the cats released the previous year gave birth to kittens. By August 2025, 35 cats had been released, with a reported total of 7 births in 2024 and 5 in 2025. Plans are being made to expand the successful reintroduction project.

In 2026, Scotland's Wildcat Strategy (2025-2045) was published. It notably presented the vision for 2045 and the process of attaining the goals and objectives of the strategy. These included the expansion and supplementation of the native Scottish wildcat populations beyond the Cairngorms region into the wider Highlands, the down-listing of the species on the IUCN Red List, habitat restoration and domestic, feral and hybrid cat management.

=== In captivity ===
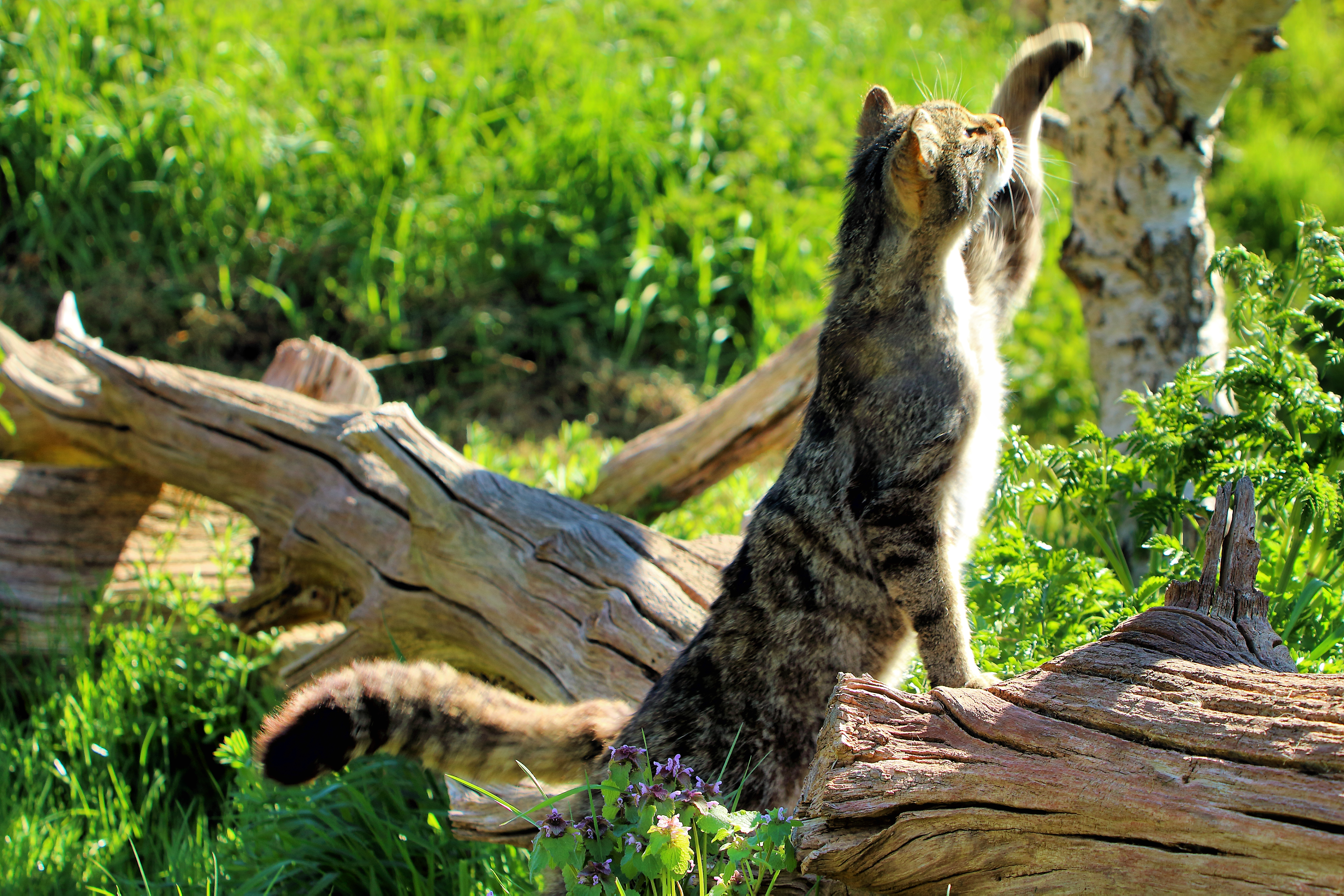
Scottish wildcat at British Wildlife Centre, 2015

A captive breeding programme for the Scottish wildcat has been established in the frame of the Scottish Wildcat Conservation Action Plan, with wild-caught individuals that pass genetic and morphological tests to be considered wildcats with less than 5% hybridization. Participating institutions include the Alladale Wilderness Reserve, Chester Zoo, British Wildlife Centre, Port Lympne Wild Animal Park, Highland Wildlife Park, New Forest Wildlife Park and Aigas Field Centre.

This captive breeding programme has drawn criticism from the Captive Animals Protection Society, an organization opposed to the existence of zoos, which stated the opinion that the breeding programme has "little to do with conservation and everything to do with these zoos stocking their cages".

Six kittens were born at the Highland Wildlife Park in 2015. From 2011 to 2016, there have been 15 surviving Scottish wildcat kittens born at the Highland Wildlife Park. As of December 2016, around 80 Scottish wildcats were in captivity.

== In culture ==
Another common name of the Scottish wildcat is "Highland tiger".

The Scottish wildcat is traditionally an icon of the Scottish wilderness. The Scottish wildcat or Kellas cat is the likely inspiration of the mythological Scottish creature cat-sìth. Since the 13th century, it has been a symbol of Clan Chattan. Most of the members of Clan Chattan have the Scottish wildcat on their crest badges, and their motto is "Touch not the cat bot a glove", bot meaning 'without'. The motto is a reference to the ferocity of the Scottish wildcat. Clan Chattan has participated in Scottish wildcat conservation efforts since 2010.

In 2010, as part of the International Year of Biodiversity, the Royal Mail issued a series of 10 stamps celebrating at-risk mammals, one of which depicted the Scottish wildcat.

The Scottish wildcat was the subject of a documentary film titled The Tigers of Scotland that was issued in 2017, narrated by Scottish actor Iain Glen. The 2024 release of the captive-bred wildcats was the subject of a two-part documentary titled Wildcats: Cait an ann Cunnart on BBC Alba. In 2019, Scottish wildcats were the central theme of the first issue of the Journal of Matters Relating to Felines, a student-led general interest magazine produced at the University of Aberdeen.
