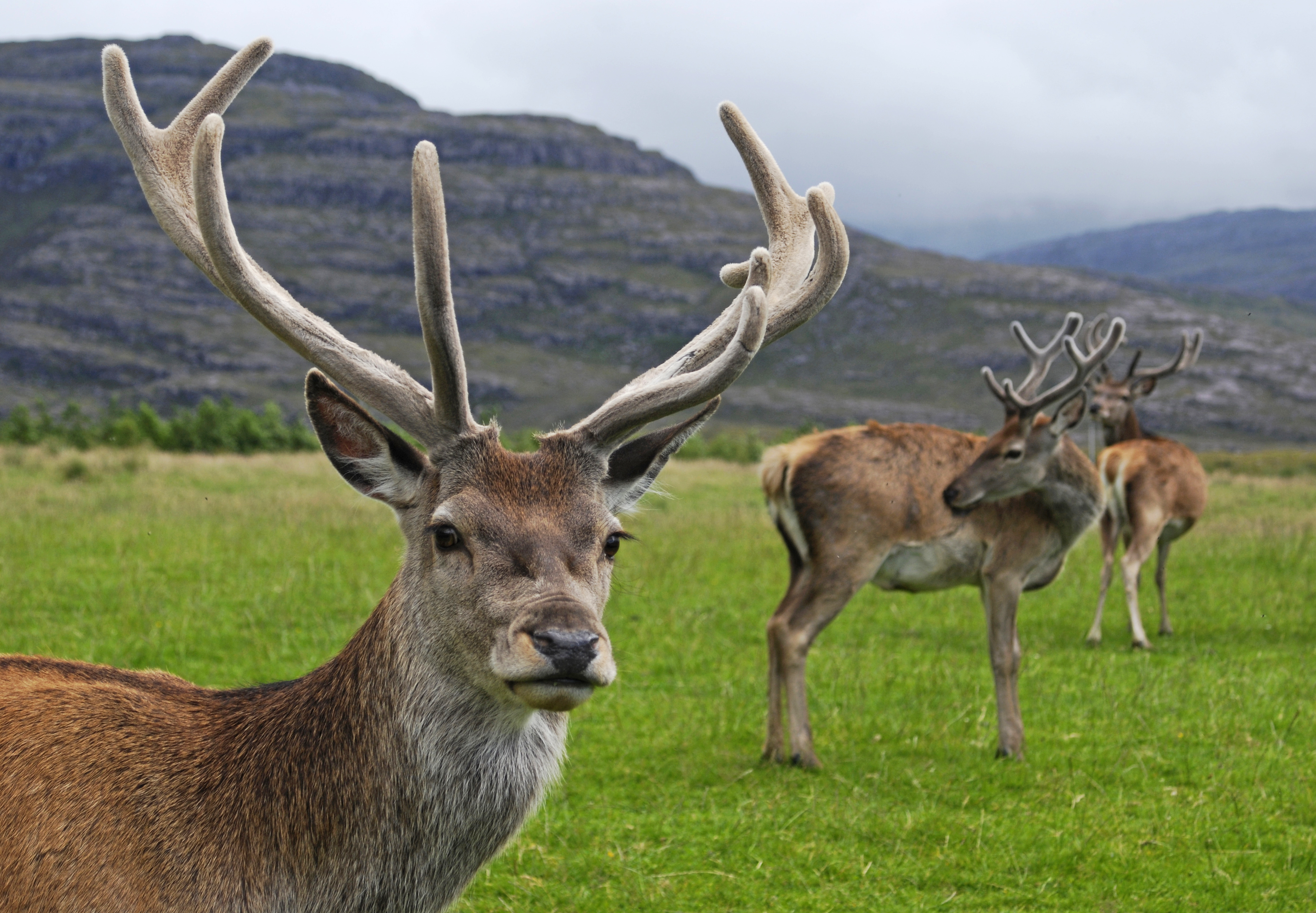

Conservation status
- Least Concern (IUCN 3.1)

Scientific classification
- Kingdom: Animalia
- Phylum: Chordata
- Class: Mammalia
- Order: Artiodactyla
- Family: Cervidae
- Genus: Cervus
- Species: C. elaphus
- Subspecies: C. e. scoticus

Trinomial name
- Cervus elaphus scoticus Lönnberg, 1906

= Scottish red deer =

Subspecies of mammal

The Scottish red deer (Cervus elaphus scoticus) is a subspecies of red deer, which is native to Great Britain. Like the red deer of Ireland, it migrated from continental Europe sometime in the Stone Age. The Scottish red deer is farmed for meat, antlers and hides.

== Description ==
This deer is slightly smaller than other Western European red deer, an example of insular dwarfism. In summer, the coat is lighter in colour with a distinct border to the lighter patch on the rump. The rest of the colour is dark reddish brown with a greyer face and neck. The legs are blackish brown. In winter the animal grows long hair on the neck. The brow and the bez tines of the antler are usually close together and at a distance above the burr.

== Range ==
This deer thrives in the Highlands and Islands of Scotland and in parts of England, such as Westmorland, Devon, Somerset, Wiltshire and the New Forest. It is also found in County Kerry and County Donegal in Ireland. However, most of the red deer kept in parks in the British Isles are derived from the larger subspecies brought from the European mainland, the Western European red deer (Cervus elaphus elaphus). This subspecies has also escaped from deer parks and has become feral in some areas.

Although mostly found in the north of Scotland, there are reports of deer being spotted in the Borders.

== Population ==
The UK's red deer population doubled in the 50 years leading up to 2018, with more than half of those animals found in Scotland. The rising population has sparked significant debate surrounding management, with proponents of culls citing the damage caused to forests and rare plants. They also pose a risk to drivers, with around 6,000 traffic collisions involving red deer taking place each year. Approximately 100,000 are culled each year, although a 2017 report by MSPs argued that efforts to manage the numbers are not succeeding.

Research by the Forestry Commission in 2014 stated that rising deer populations pose the biggest threat to Scotland's native ancient woodlands.

In November 2019 it was revealed that a 45-year study indicated that climate change had affected the gene pool of the red deer population on Rùm, one of the Inner Hebrides islands, Scotland. Warmer temperatures resulted in deer giving birth on average three days earlier for each decade of the study. The gene which selects for earlier birth has increased in the population because those with the gene have more calves over their lifetime. Dr Timothée Bonnet, of the Australian National University, leader of the study, said they had "documented evolution in action".
