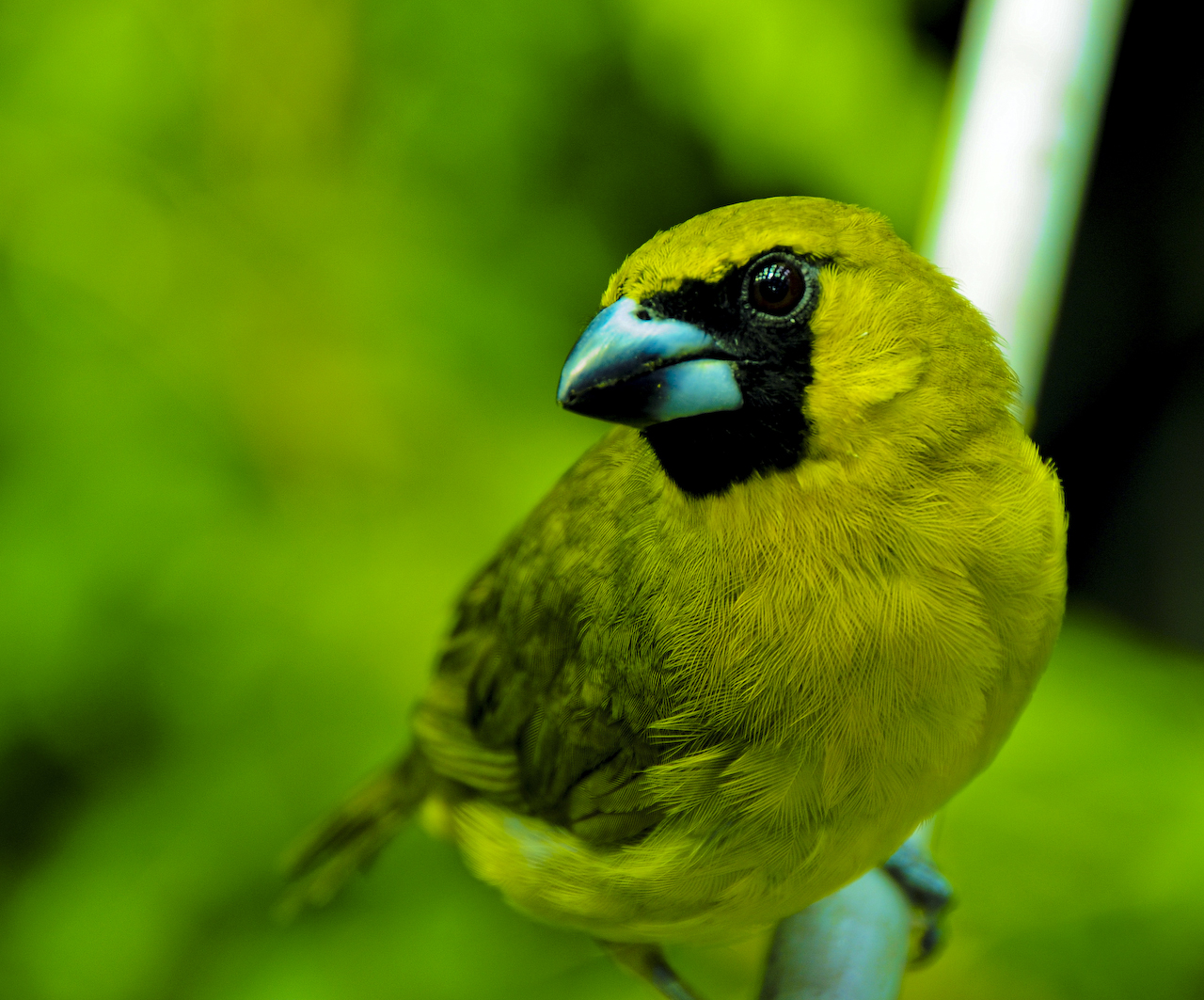

Conservation status
- Least Concern (IUCN 3.1)

Scientific classification
- Kingdom: Animalia
- Phylum: Chordata
- Class: Aves
- Order: Passeriformes
- Family: Cardinalidae
- Genus: Caryothraustes
- Species: C. canadensis

Binomial name
- Caryothraustes canadensis (Linnaeus, 1766)

Synonyms
- Loxia canadensis Linnaeus, 1766

= Yellow-green grosbeak =

Species of bird

The yellow-green grosbeak (Caryothraustes canadensis) is a species of bird in the family Cardinalidae, the cardinals, grosbeaks, and “tanager” allies. It is found in Brazil, Colombia, French Guiana, Guyana, Panama, Suriname, and Venezuela.

== Taxonomy and systematics ==
In 1760 the French zoologist Mathurin Jacques Brisson included a description of the yellow-green grosbeak in his Ornithologie based on a specimen collected in Cayenne in French Guiana. He used the French name Le Gros-bec de Cayenne and the Latin name Coccothraustes Cayanensis. Although Brisson coined Latin names, these do not conform to the binomial system and are not recognised by the International Commission on Zoological Nomenclature. When in 1766 the Swedish naturalist Carl Linnaeus updated his Systema Naturae for the twelfth edition he added 240 species that had been previously described by Brisson including the yellow-green grosbeak. Linnaeus included a terse description, used the binomial Loxia canadensis, and cited Brisson's work. Linnaeus mistakenly claimed that the species occurred in Canada rather than Cayenne and introduced the specific name canadensis for Canada where the bird does not occur.

The yellow-green grosbeak is now placed in the genus Caryothraustes that was introduced by the German naturalist Ludwig Reichenbach in 1850. According to most taxonomic systems it shares the genus with the black-faced grosbeak (C. poliogaster). However, BirdLife International's Handbook of the Birds of the World (HBW) also includes the crimson-collared grosbeak and the red-and-black grosbeak in the genus. The other systems assign them to the genus Periporphyrus.

The yellow-green grosbeak has these four subspecies:

- C. c. simulans Nelson, 1912
- C. c. canadensis (Linnaeus, 1766)
- C. c. frontalis (Hellmayr, 1905)
- C. c. brasiliensis Cabanis, 1851

== Description ==
The yellow-green grosbeak is 17 to 18.5 cm (6.7 to 7.3 in) long and weighs 31 to 36 g (1.1 to 1.3 oz). The sexes have the same plumage. Adults of the nominate subspecies C. c. canadensis have black lores, cheeks, and throat. The rest of their head and their upperparts and tail are yellowish green. Their wings are mostly yellowish green with yellow edges on the inner webs of the flight feathers. Their underparts are mostly bright yellow with a slight greenish tinge on the breast and flanks. Subspecies C. c. simulans has paler upperparts than the nominate with a gray tinge on the scapulars. C. c. frontalis is like the nominate with a black band above the bill. C. c. brasiliensis is larger than the nominate and has a brighter yellow forecrown. All subspecies have a brown iris, a heavy black bill with a bluish gray base, and gray legs and feet.

== Distribution and habitat ==
The yellow-green grosbeak has a disjunct distribution; each subspecies is separate from the others. The subspecies are found thus:

- C. c. simulans: Cerro Pirre and Serrania de Jungurundú in eastern Panama's Darién Province
- C. c. canadensis: from Guainía and Vaupés departments in southeastern Colombia east across southeastern Venezuela's Amazonas, Bolívar, and southern Delta Amacuro states and the Guianas and northern Brazil; in Brazil its southern border is an approximate line from west-central Amazonas to far northern Ceará with a southerly bulge in eastern Amazonas and western Pará
- C. c. frontalis: northeastern Brazil's Paraíba, Pernambuco, and Alagoas states
- C. c. brasiliensis: southeastern Brazil from eastern Bahia south to Rio de Janeiro state

The yellow-green grosbeak inhabits the interior and edges of humid evergreen forest in the tropical and lower subtropical zones. Sources differ on its elevational range. One states it is from sea level to 900 m (3,000 ft). According to another, subspecies C. c. simulans ranges between 750 and 1,250 m (2,500 and 4,100 ft). According to field guides to birds of the countries, it reaches 300 m (1,000 ft) in Colombia, 1,000 m (3,300 ft) in Venezuela, and 900 m (3,000 ft) in Brazil.

== Behavior ==
=== Movement ===
As far as is known, the yellow-green grosbeak is a sedentary year-round resident.

=== Feeding ===
The yellow-green grosbeak feeds on fruit and insects. It typically forages in flocks of 12 or more individuals which often join mixed-species feeding flocks. It forages from the forest's mid-level to its canopy.

=== Breeding ===
The yellow-green grosbeak's breeding season has not been fully defined. It is known to include March and November in French Guiana, January and February in Amazonian Brazil, and to span at least February to April in Venezuela. One nest was described as "an untidy cup" made from strips of bark. It and another were about 7 to 8 m (23 to 26 ft) above the ground in trees. The clutch is two eggs (possibly also three) that are cream-colored with brown spots. Nothing else is known about the species' breeding biology.

=== Vocalization ===
The yellow-green grosbeak's dawn song is "a rather lively but monotonously repeated chap, chap cheeweep... with scarcely a pause". When foraging it makes a "loud, buzzy rattle, b'z'z'et! and [a] loud, often-repeated teach-yerp! with rising then falling inflection".

== Status ==
The IUCN has assessed the yellow-green grosbeak as being of Least Concern. It has an extremely large range; its estimated population of at least five million mature individuals is believed to be decreasing. No immediate threats have been identified. It is considered common in its limited Colombian range, "uncommon to locally common" in Venezuela, and "common to frequent" in all three of its Brazilian ranges.
