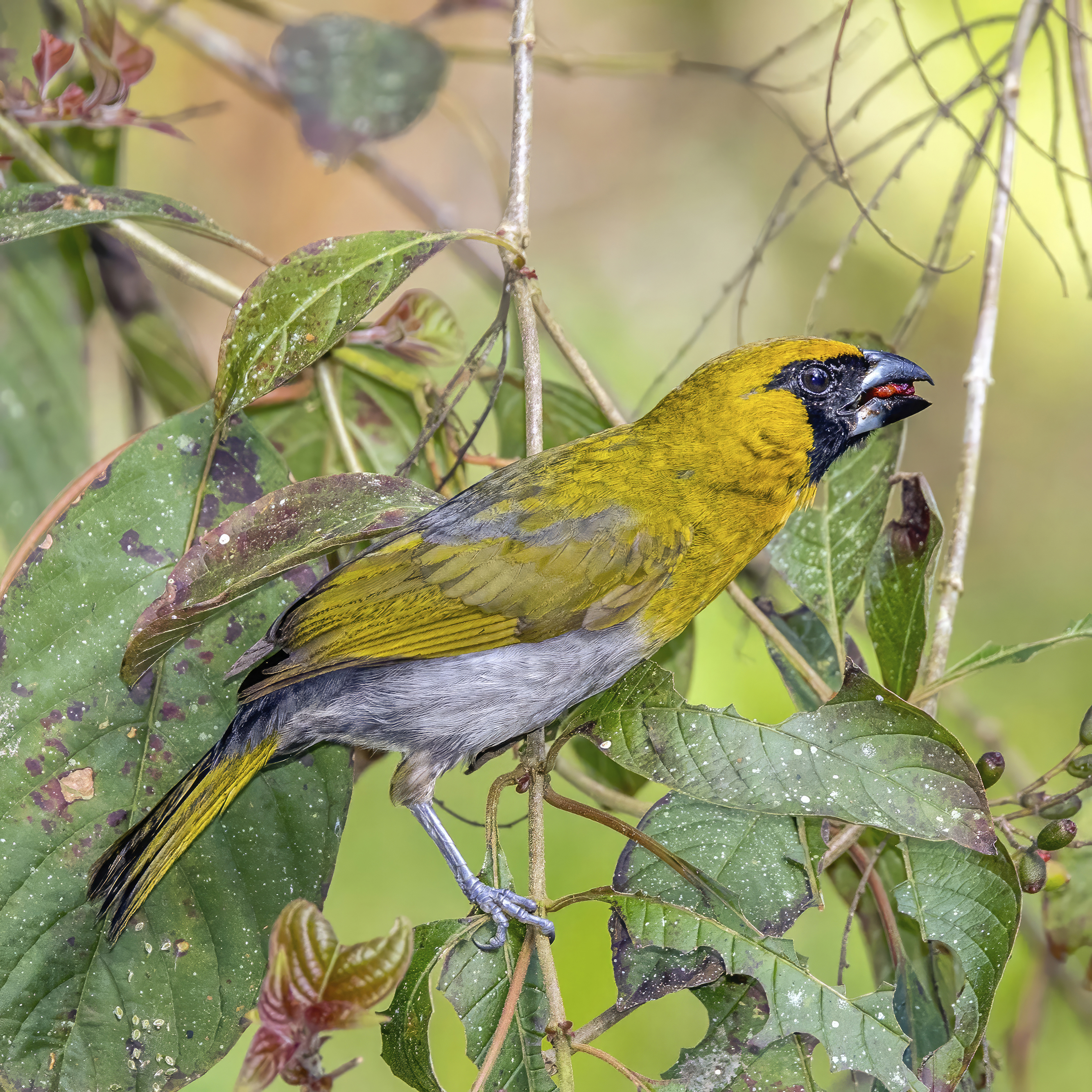
- In Belize

Conservation status
- Least Concern (IUCN 3.1)

Scientific classification
- Kingdom: Animalia
- Phylum: Chordata
- Class: Aves
- Order: Passeriformes
- Family: Cardinalidae
- Genus: Caryothraustes
- Species: C. poliogaster

Binomial name
- Caryothraustes poliogaster (Du Bus de Gisignies, 1847)

= Black-faced grosbeak =

Species of bird

The black-faced grosbeak (Caryothraustes poliogaster) is a species of bird in the family Cardinalidae, the cardinals, grosbeaks, and “tanager” allies. it is found from Mexico to Panama.

== Taxonomy and systematics ==
The black-faced grosbeak was formally described in 1847 with the binomial Pitylus poliogaster. According to most taxonomic systems it now shares the genus Caryothraustes with the yellow-green grosbeak (C. canadensis). However, BirdLife International's Handbook of the Birds of the World (HBW) also includes the crimson-collared grosbeak and the red-and-black grosbeak in the genus. The other systems assign them to the genus Periporphyrus.

The black-faced grosbeak has two subspecies, the nominate C. p. poliogaster (Du Bus de Gisignies, 1847) and C. p. scapularis (Ridgway, 1888).

== Description ==
The black-faced grosbeak is about 14 to 22 cm (5.5 to 8.7 in) long; five individuals weighed an average of 35 g (1.2 oz). The sexes have the same plumage. Adults of the nominate subspecies are black on their lores, face, and throat. Their forecrown is yellow and the rest of their head is yellow with an olive tinge. Their upper back, wings, and tail are yellowish olive-green. Their scapulars, lower back, rump, and uppertail coverts are slate gray. Their breast is yellow with an olive tinge on all but the edge of the throat. Their flanks are pale gray that becomes grayish white on the belly. Their undertail coverts are pale brownish gray with wide buffy whitish edges. Subspecies C. p. scapularis is smaller than the nominate. Their scapulars and lower back are the same yellowish olive-green as their upper back where the nominate is slate gray. Both sexes of both subspecies have a brown or reddish brown iris, a thick hooked bill with a black maxilla and a gray or blue-gray mandible, and bluish gray legs and feet. Juveniles are duller overall than adults and have a less distinct facial pattern.

== Distribution and habitat ==
The black-faced grosbeak has a disjunct distribution on the Caribbean side of Mexico and Central America; the subspecies' ranges are not contiguous. The nominate subspecies is the more northerly. It is found from central Veracruz and northeastern Oaxaca in southern Mexico south through northern Chiapas to southern Quintana Roo and continuing through northern Guatemala and most of Belize into northern Honduras. The nominate is found from eastern Honduras south through eastern Nicaragua and eastern Costa Rica into western Panama as far as Coclé Province. It occurs casually further east in Panama and formerly reached Panamá Province.

The black-faced grosbeak primarily inhabits the interior and edges of evergreen forest in the tropical and lower subtropical zones. It also occurs in secondary forest and pastures with some trees, on the edges of pine savanna, and in gardens near its primary habitat. Sources differ somewhat on its elevational range. One states it is from sea level to 900 m (3,000 ft). Another says it is mostly found up to 1,000 m (3,300 ft) but occurs up to 1,250 m (4,100 ft). A field guide that covers Guatemala, Belize, and Honduras says it reaches 1,200 m (3,900 ft) there. It reaches 900 m (3,000 ft) in Costa Rica.

== Behavior ==
=== Movement ===
The black-faced grosbeak is a year-round resident.

=== Feeding ===
The black-faced grosbeak feeds on fruit and insects. Most observations report its feeding on a wide variety of fruits, among them figs (Ficus sp.) and Cecropia. A study in Mexico found it feeding on fruits of Cymbopetalum mayanum, Bursera simaruba, and Trophis racemosa. Less detail is known about its insect prey but it is known to include adults and larvae. It gleans prey from leaves and branches and takes some insects on the wing. It forages mostly in the forest canopy though it sometimes feeds lower in clearings. It usually forages in groups of up to about five individuals that may constitute a family or a pair with helpers. It sometimes is in larger groups and often joins mixed-species feeding flocks.

=== Breeding ===
The black-faced grosbeak's breeding season has not been fully established, but it includes April in Mexico, March to May in Belize, and April to July in Costa Rica. Its nest is a shallow cup; one was made from fern rhizomes lined with leaves and Tillandsia. The clutch is three eggs that are white with brown spots or mottling. In one study the female alone incubated, for 13 days. Fledging occurs about 11 or 12 days after hatch. Both parents and in some cases other adult helpers provision nestlings.

=== Vocalisation ===
"The vocalizations of Black-faced Grosbeak are loud and arresting, and are often given by several flock members." Some examples include "a buzzy zzzrt or whrt, a ch-weést, tree-dreek, pt, pwtst, ree-ree-reek, or chew-chew-chew, often in combinations". Its song is "a short, sweet, and leisurely warble of sharp squeaky whistles...curtweét chrutweét churtweétcha or tai tsi-tsi tseu choo".

== Status ==
The IUCN has assessed the black-faced grosbeak as being of Least Concern. It has a very large range; its estimated population of at least 50,000 mature individuals is believed to be decreasing. No immediate threats have been identified. It is considered uncommon to fairly common in northern Central America and common in Costa Rica. "The flexibility that Black-faced Grosbeaks show regarding habitat types and their tolerance of edge and secondary forest also suggests that this bird is not facing imminent danger...However, several studies have failed to find them in disturbed landscapes...despite their presence in forests nearby."
