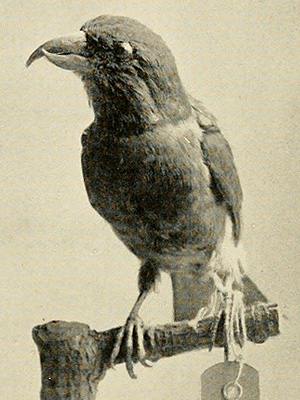
- Mounted specimen

Scientific classification
- Kingdom: Animalia
- Phylum: Chordata
- Class: Aves
- Order: Passeriformes
- Family: Fringillidae
- Subfamily: Carduelinae
- Genus: Loxia
- Species: L. curvirostra
- Subspecies: L. c. percna

Trinomial name
- Loxia curvirostra percna Bent, 1834

= Newfoundland crossbill =

Subspecies of bird

The Newfoundland red crossbill (Loxia curvirostra percna) is a subspecies of the red crossbill found on and believed to be endemic to the island of Newfoundland, and recently also discovered on Anticosti Island in the Gulf of Saint Lawrence, administratively part of Quebec. Its population on Newfoundland is greatly reduced (and had even been considered extinct by some), due to competition from introduced American red squirrels Tamiasciurus hudsonicus.

It is very similar to other North American subspecies of red crossbill, differing primarily in its stouter bill, 9–10 mm thick at the base, compared to 8 mm for other populations in Canada, and also marginally larger overall. Its calls are also distinct, given the designation 'vocal type 8' to distinguish it from other subspecies. The plumage is very similar to other subspecies, though on average slightly darker and duskier.

The taxonomy of the bird has been questioned.
