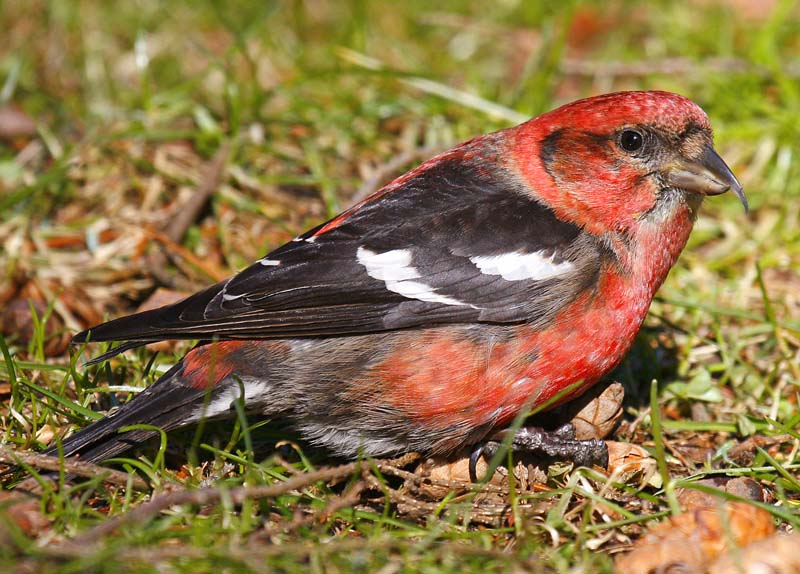

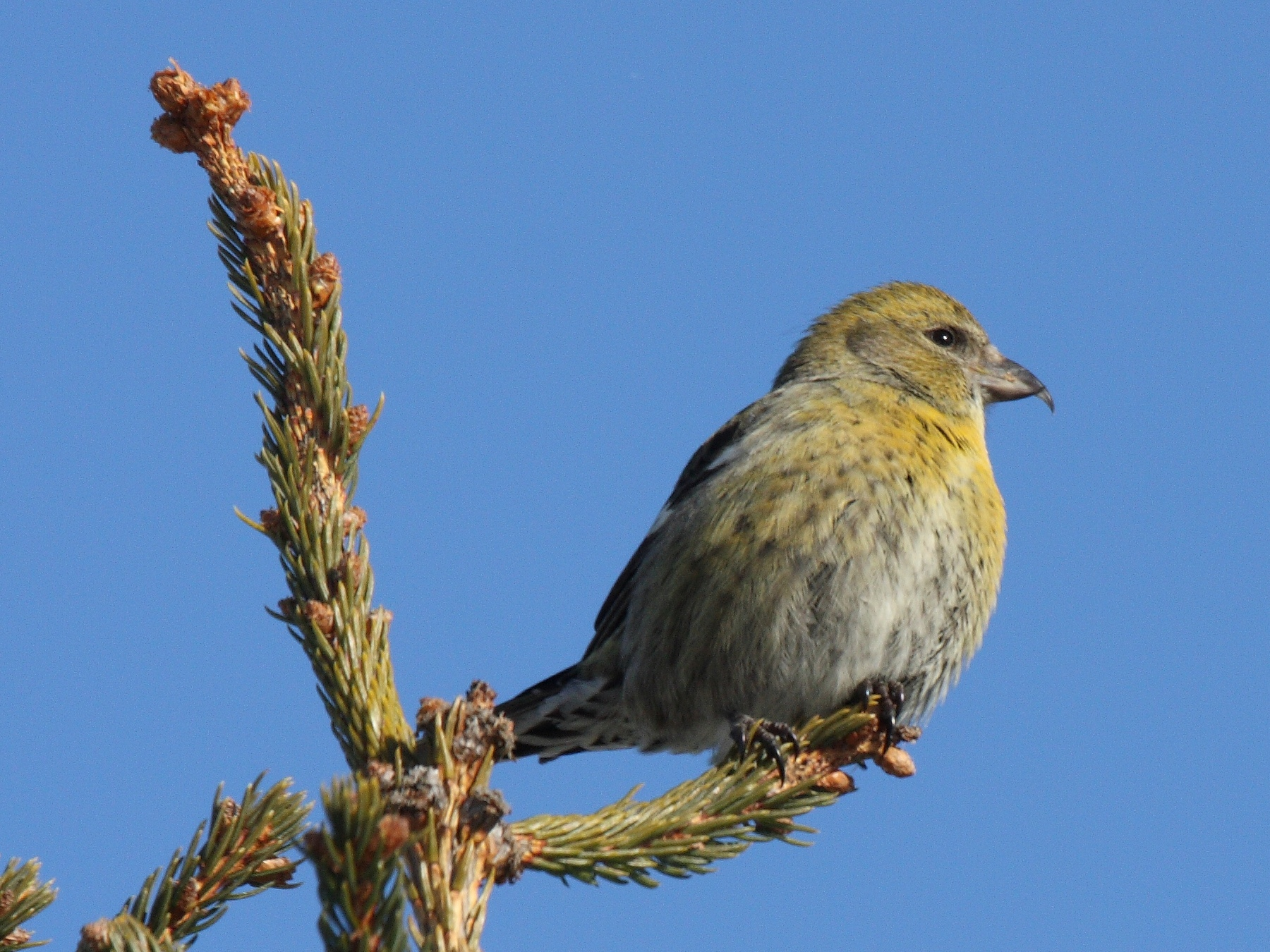
- Male above, female below

Conservation status
- Least Concern (IUCN 3.1)

Scientific classification
- Kingdom: Animalia
- Phylum: Chordata
- Class: Aves
- Order: Passeriformes
- Family: Fringillidae
- Subfamily: Carduelinae
- Genus: Loxia
- Species: L. leucoptera

Binomial name
- Loxia leucoptera Gmelin, JF, 1789
- Distribution Year-round Nonbreeding

= Two-barred crossbill =

Species of bird

The two-barred crossbill or white-winged crossbill (Loxia leucoptera) is a small passerine bird in the finch family Fringillidae. It breeds in the coniferous forests of North America and the Palearctic.

== Taxonomy ==
The two-barred crossbill was formally described in 1789 by the German naturalist Johann Friedrich Gmelin in his revised and expanded edition of Carl Linnaeus's Systema Naturae. He placed it with the crossbills in the genus Loxia and coined the binomial name Loxia leucoptera. Gmelin specified the locality as Hudson Bay and New York. The specific epithet leucoptera is from Ancient Greek leukopteros meaning "white-winged" (leukos means "white" and pteron means "wing"). Gmelin based his account on the "white winged crossbill" that had been described in 1783 by the English ornithologist John Latham in his multi-volume work A General Synopsis of Birds. Latham had examined a specimen in the Leverian Museum in London.

Two subspecies are recognised:

- L. l. bifasciata (Brehm, CL, 1827) – north Europe to east Siberia and northeast China
- L. l. leucoptera Gmelin, JF, 1789 – Alaska, Canada and north USA

== Description ==
The two-barred crossbill is 14.5–17 cm (5.7–6.7 in) in length and weighs 25–40 g (0.88–1.41 oz). It has short legs, a forked tail, a crossed bill and two prominent white wing-bars. The male of the nominate subspecies has forehead, crown, nape and upper-parts bright raspberry-red. The scapulars are black or blackish brown with pink edges. The upper tail coverts are black with white fringes. The female lacks the pink and instead has greenish-yellow head and upperparts.

The two-barred is easier to identify than other crossbills, especially in North America, where only the red crossbill (Loxia curvirostra) and this species occur. Within its Palearctic range, this species is smaller-headed and smaller-billed than the parrot crossbill and Scottish crossbill, so the main confusion between species both there and in North America is with the red or common crossbill.

The main plumage distinction from the red crossbill is the white wingbars which give this species its English and scientific names. There are also white tips to the tertials. The adult male is also a somewhat brighter (pinker) red than other male crossbills. Some red crossbills occasionally show weak white wingbars, so care is needed with the correct identification of this species. The chip call is weaker and higher than that of the red crossbill.

Another crossbill species on Hispaniola in the Caribbean was previously treated as a subspecies (Loxia leucoptera megaplaga), but is now treated as a distinct species: the Hispaniolan crossbill (Loxia megaplaga). It is associated with the Hispaniolan pine tree (Pinus occidentalis), and differs from the two-barred crossbill in darker plumage, a stouter bill, and its geographic isolation compared to other crossbill species.

== Distribution and habitat ==
This bird breeds in the coniferous forests of Alaska, Canada, the northernmost United States and across the Palearctic extending into northeast Europe. It nests in conifers, laying 3–5 eggs.

This crossbill is mainly resident, but will irregularly irrupt south if its food source fails. The American race seems to wander more frequently than the Eurosiberian subspecies. This species will form flocks outside the breeding season, often mixed with other crossbills. It is a rare visitor to western Europe, usually arriving with an irruption of red crossbills.

== Behaviour ==
=== Food and feeding ===
They are specialist feeders on conifer cones, and the unusual bill shape is an adaptation to assist the extraction of the seeds from the cone. The two-barred crossbill has a strong preference for larch (Larix), in Eurosiberia using Siberian larch (Larix sibirica) and Dahurian larch (L. gmelinii), and in North America Tamarack larch (L. laricina). It will also take rowan (Sorbus) berries, and in North America, also eastern hemlock (Tsuga canadensis) and white spruce (Picea glauca) cones.

=== Breeding ===
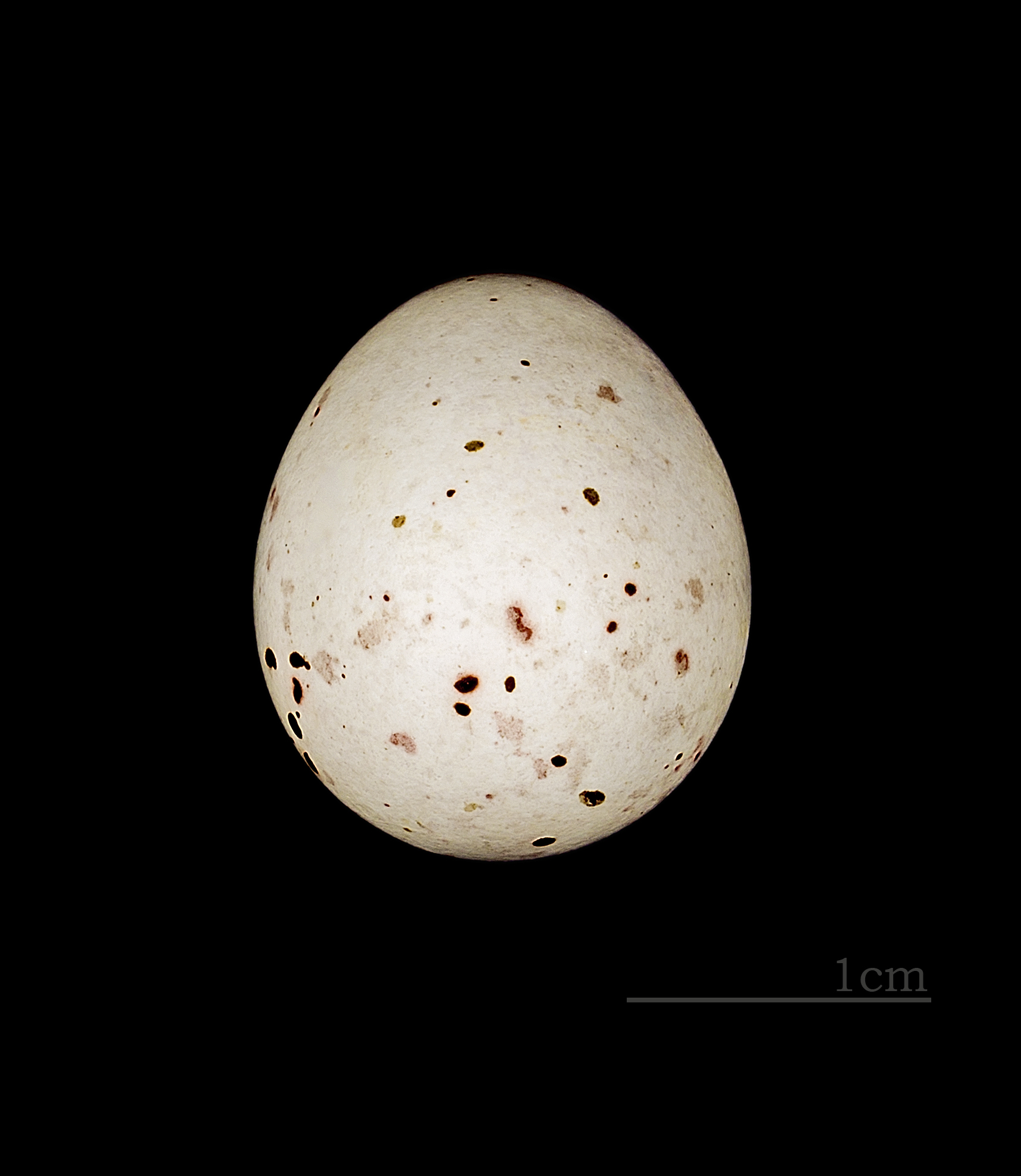
Egg, MHNT

The nest is placed 2–20 m (6 ft 7 in – 65 ft 7 in) above the ground, usually against the trunk of a conifer. The nest is built by the female and mainly consists of conifer twigs. The clutch of 3–4 eggs is incubated by the female for 14–15 days. The chicks are fed by both parents. They fledge after 22–24 days but then remain with their parents for up to 6 weeks.
