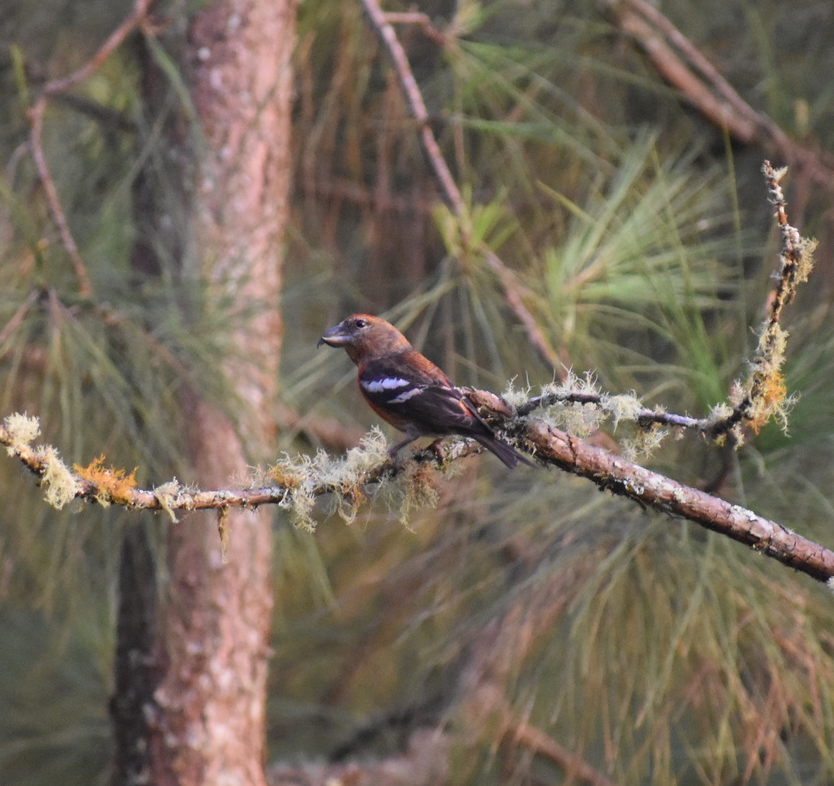

Conservation status
- Endangered (IUCN 3.1)

Scientific classification
- Kingdom: Animalia
- Phylum: Chordata
- Class: Aves
- Order: Passeriformes
- Family: Fringillidae
- Subfamily: Carduelinae
- Genus: Loxia
- Species: L. megaplaga

Binomial name
- Loxia megaplaga Riley, 1916

= Hispaniolan crossbill =

Species of bird

The Hispaniolan crossbill (Loxia megaplaga) is an Endangered species of passerine bird in the family Fringillidae, the finches and euphonias. It is endemic to the island of Hispaniola that is shared by Haiti and the Dominican Republic).

== Taxonomy and systematics ==
The Hispaniolan crossbill was originally described in 1916 with its current binomial Loxia megaplaga. It was soon reclassified as a subspecies of the two-barred crossbill (L. leucoptera), which is also called the white-winged crossbill. Since about 2000, and certainly 2003, taxonomic systems again recognized it as a full species.

Mitochondrial DNA and other analyses conclude that the Hispaniolan crossbill probably diverged from the two-barred crossbill no later than the end of the Pleistocene but at most about 680,000 years ago. As the Pleistocene glaciers receded and the landscape warmed the species was isolated in cooler mountain ranges above the lowlands. There are significant morphological differences between the two species. Notably, the Hispaniolan's bill is 25% larger than that of the two-barred.

The Hispaniolan crossbill is monotypic. It is the only member of genus Loxia in the Caribbean.

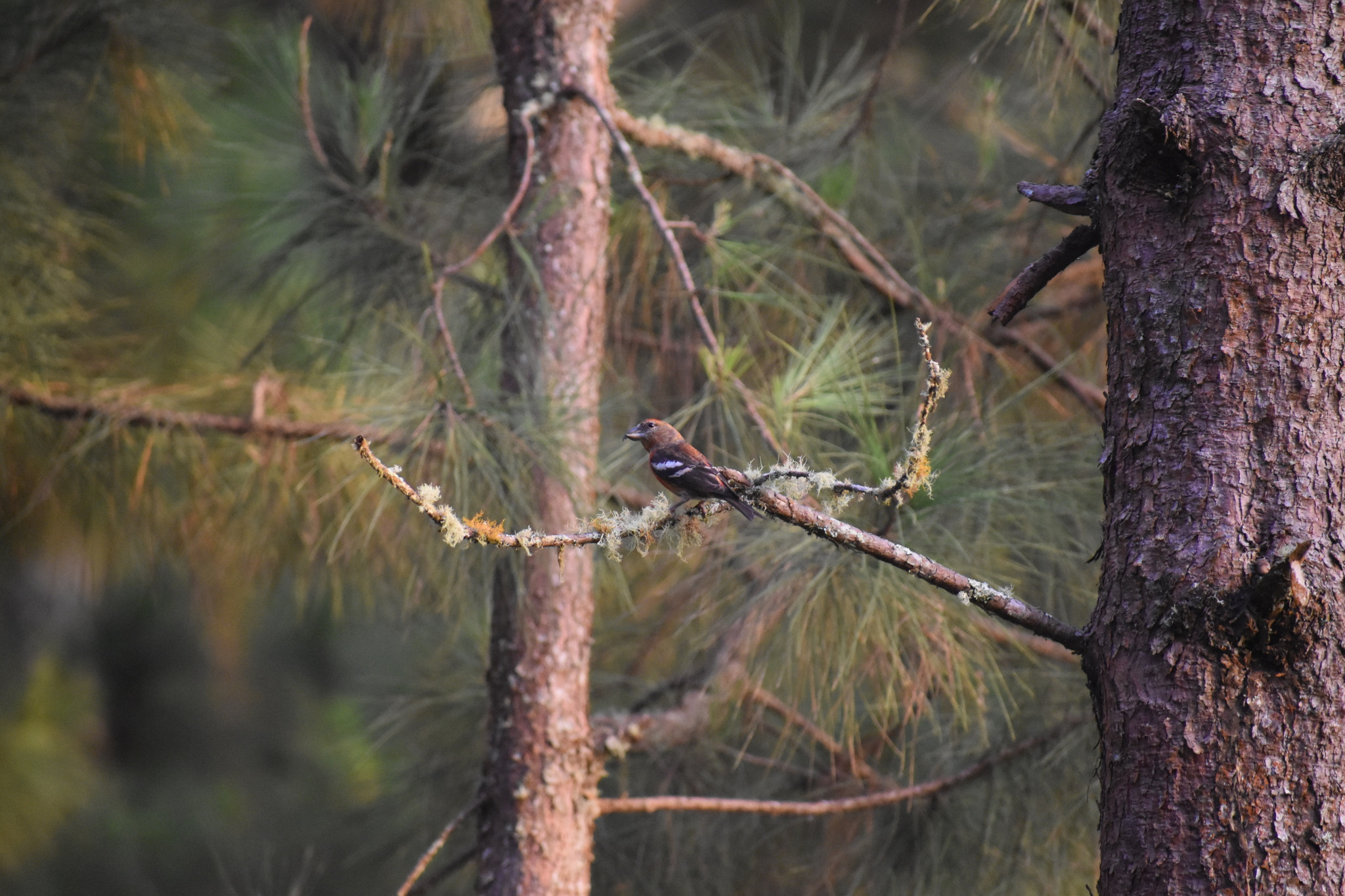
Hispaniolan crossbill perched on a Hispaniolan pine in Haiti

== Description ==
The Hispaniolan crossbill is about 15 to 16 cm (5.9 to 6.3 in) long and weighs about 28 g (0.99 oz). The species is sexually dimorphic. Both sexes have the characteristic crossed bill from which the genus' English name derives. In this species the direction of the crossing is variable. Adult males are mostly dull brown with a reddish to reddish orange wash that is heaviest on the nape, upper back, and upper chest. Their wings are blackish with two white wing bars. Adult females are also mostly dull brown. They have a yellow rump, a yellow wash on the upper breast, and thin brown streaks on the whole breast. Both sexes have a dark brown to black iris, a gray to black bill, and pink legs and feet. Juveniles are similar to adult females but are browner overall and have heavier streaks on the breast.

== Distribution and habitat ==
The Hispaniolan crossbill has a highly disjunct distribution on the island of Hispaniola. It is found in Haiti in the Massif de la Selle and Massif de la Hotte. In the Dominican Republic it is found in the Sierra de Bahoruco and Cordillera Central. A few individuals in Jamaica's Blue Mountains in the 1970s are believed to have been vagrants. The species inhabits forests of Hispaniolan pine (Pinus occidentalis). This tree is found from about 540 m (1,800 ft) above sea level up to about 2,600 m (8,500 ft).

== Behavior ==
=== Movement ===
The Hispaniolan crossbill is overall a year-round resident, though it is nomadic in response to changing areas within each range that have mature pine cones.

=== Feeding ===
The Hispaniolan crossbill feeds primarily on the seeds of the Hispaniolan pine. It pries cone scales apart with its crossed bill and extracts the seeds with its tongue. In addition to pine seeds, there are also a very few isolated observations of single birds feeding on palm fruit and mistletoe fruit. The species forages in the upper branches of tall pines and typically on the outer part of branches where foliage is of medium density. Typically the chosen trees are about 85 to 105 years old; trees of this age are believed to produce more cones than younger ones.

=== Breeding ===
The Hispaniolan crossbill has bred in all seasons though most nesting occurs from early January to April. It nests in loose clusters, apparently in response to a favorable microclimate, food availability, or predator defense. Females construct the nest with the male guarding nearby. The nest is an open cup made from twigs and pine needles lined with more needles and lichen. It is typically placed high in a pine tree near the trunk. The clutch size appears to be two or three eggs that are white or pale blue with small brownish marks. Females incubate for about 13 days during which time the male feeds her. The time to fledging following hatch is not known. Both sexes provision nestlings and fledglings.

=== Vocalization ===
The Hispaniolan crossbill's song is a "high-pitched, emphatic, repeated chu-chu-chu-chu". Other vocalizations include "a soft, whistling warble", a "chit-chit" contact note between members of a pair, and a "chut" call by a male that was being attacked by a merlin (Falco columbarius).

== Status ==
The IUCN has assessed the Hispaniolan crossbill as Endangered. It has a "very small, fragmented and declining range". Though its overall range is estimated at 31,800 km^{2} (12,300 sq mi) its actual area of occupancy is about 1,530 km^{2} (590 sq mi). Its estimated population of between 1000 and 2300 mature individuals is believe to be decreasing. Much of its habitat has been cleared for agriculture. Though the pace has apparently declined since the 1960s "clearance for small-scale agriculture continues to fragment remaining habitat". "Habitat loss in the Sierra de Baoruco has recently [c 2016] accelerated owing to clearance for commercial-scale agriculture." Most of the species' population is in Sierra de Bahoruco National Park but it has no active protection there. "The principal threat may now [2000] be uncontrolled stand replacement fires, which burn more of the remaining pine habitat than can be replaced through regeneration." A field guide to birds of the Caribbean describes it as "uncommon and local in [the] highest mountains".

== Additional reading ==
- Dod, Annabelle Stockton (1978). Aves de la República Dominicana. Museo Nacional de Historia Natural, Santo Domingo, Dominican Republic.
- Dod, A. S. (1992). Endangered and Endemic Birds of the Dominican Republic. Cypress House ISBN 1-879384-12-4
