= Loxia patevi =

Loxia patevi Temporal range: Late Pliocene

Scientific classification
- Kingdom: Animalia
- Phylum: Chordata
- Class: Aves
- Order: Passeriformes
- Family: Fringillidae
- Subfamily: Carduelinae
- Genus: Loxia
- Species: †L. patevi

Binomial name
- †Loxia patevi Boev, 1999

Extinct species of bird

Loxia patevi is an extinct species of crossbill in the genus Loxia that lived during the Piacenzian stage of the Pliocene epoch.

== Distribution ==
Loxia patevi fossils are known from the site of Varshets in Bulgaria.
