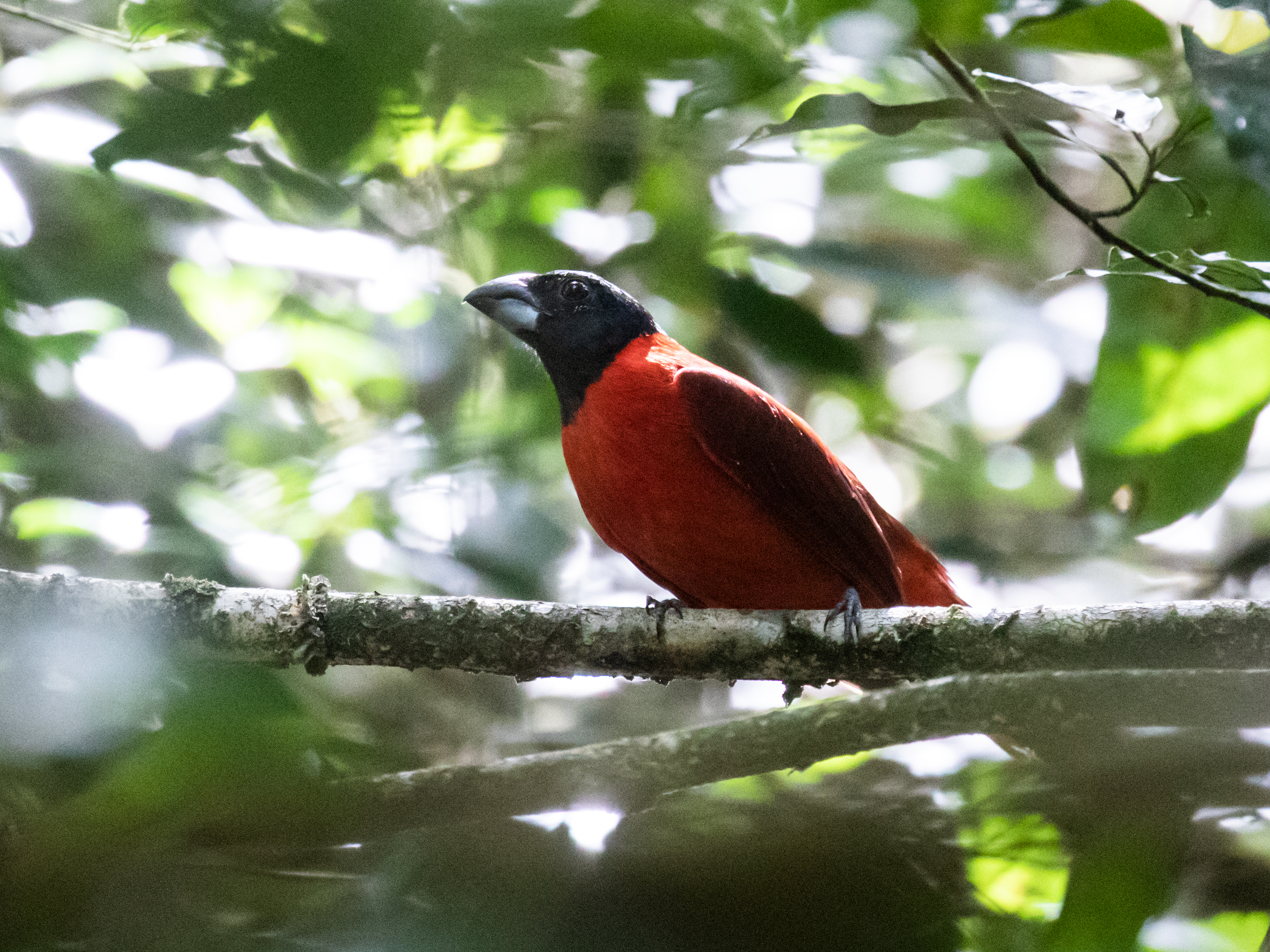

Conservation status
- Least Concern (IUCN 3.1)

Scientific classification
- Kingdom: Animalia
- Phylum: Chordata
- Class: Aves
- Order: Passeriformes
- Family: Cardinalidae
- Genus: Periporphyrus
- Species: P. erythromelas

Binomial name
- Periporphyrus erythromelas (Gmelin, JF, 1789)
- Approximate range

= Red-and-black grosbeak =

Species of bird

The red-and-black grosbeak (Periporphyrus erythromelas) is a species of bird in the family Cardinalidae, the cardinals, grosbeaks, and “tanager” allies. It is found in Brazil, French Guiana, Guyana, Suriname, and Venezuela.

== Taxonomy and systematics ==
The red-and-black grosbeak was formally described in 1789 by the German naturalist Johann Friedrich Gmelin in his revised and expanded edition of Carl Linnaeus's Systema Naturae. He placed it in the genus Loxia and coined the binomial Loxia erythromelas. The specific epithet is from Ancient Greek and means "blackish-red" or "red and black"; eruthros means "red" and melas means "black". Gmelin based his description on the "black-headed grosbeak" that had been described and illustrated in 1783 by the English ornithologist John Latham in his book A General Synopsis of Birds. Latham had examined specimens from Cayenne at the Leverian Museum in London.

The red-and-black grosbeak's further taxonomy is unsettled. By 2026 most taxonomic systems had placed it in genus Periporphyrus with the crimson-collared grosbeak (P. celaeno). However, BirdLife International's Handbook of the Birds of the World (HBW) places it in genus Caryothraustes.

The red-and-black grosbeak is monotypic.

== Description ==
The red-and-black-grosbeak is 20.5 cm (8.1 in) long; one male weighed 48 g (1.7 oz). Both sexes have a heavy bill and their entire head including the throat is black. The male's nape, breast, and belly are bright red and its back is a deep red. Its wings are blackish brown with reddish brown edges on the flight feathers. Its tail is reddish. The female's upperparts are dark greenish yellow and their underparts yellowish green with some darker mottling. Their flight feathers are blackish brown with wide yellowish green edges on the outer webs. Their tail is dark greenish brown. The immature male has a similar color scheme to the adult but it is duller with orange-red underparts. Both sexes have a dark brown iris, a black maxilla, a silver-gray or pale blue-gray mandible whose tip and tomium are black, and dark grayish black or pinkish gray legs and feet.

== Distribution and habitat ==
The red-and-black grosbeak is primarily found from the eastern edges of far eastern Venezuela's Bolívar and Delta Amacuro states east through the Guianas and into northeastern Brazil. In Brazil it ranges from Amapá to northwestern Maranhão and inland along the Amazon at least to western Pará, and there are scattered records west and south of that range. It inhabits mature humid terra firme and várzea forest. In elevation it reaches 1,000 m (3,300 ft) in Venezuela and Brazil.

== Behavior ==
=== Movement ===
The red-and-black grosbeak is believed to be a sedentary year-round resident.

=== Feeding ===
The red-and-black grosbeak forages in the lower levels of the forest for arthropods and seeds. It does not join mixed-species foraging flocks but feeds in pairs or family groups.

=== Breeding ===
Nothing is known about the red-and-black grosbeak's breeding biology.

=== Vocalization ===
Both sexes of red-and-black grosbeak sing "an exceptionally sweet series of halting phrases that slide up and down". The song has been written as "tuweé-tjuh-tejèh-tjuh". Its call is "a high-pitched, sharp spink".

== Status ==
The IUCN originally in 1988 assessed the red-and-black grosbeak as being of Least Concern, then in 2012 as Near Threatened, and since 2020 again as of Least Concern. It has a large range; its estimated population of at least 100,000 mature individuals is believed to be decreasing. "Deforestation is the primary threat affecting this species. It requires near pristine forest and so is especially sensitive to fragmentation and disturbance, particularly as it is already rare and occurs at low densities." It is considered "rare to very uncommon" in Venezuela and "uncommon to rare" in Brazil.
