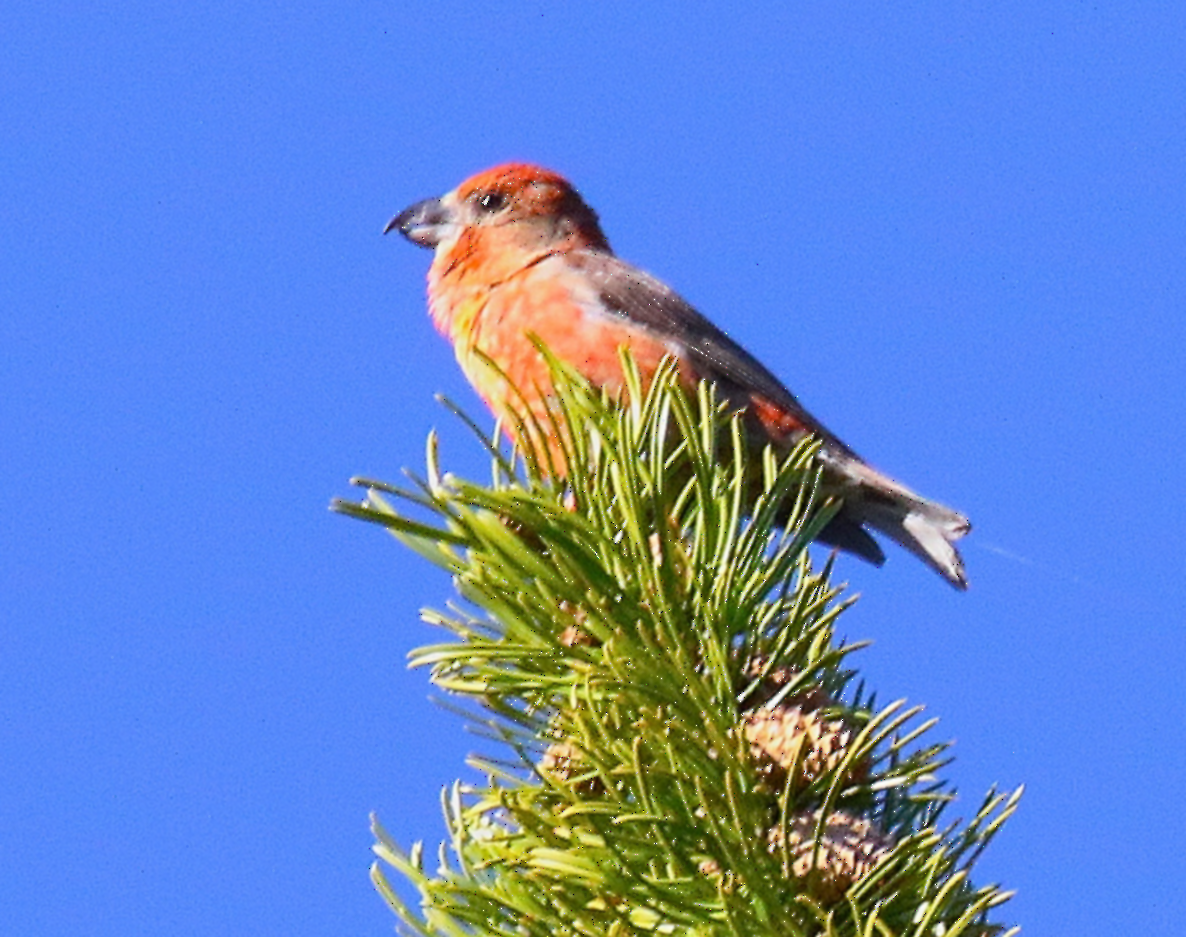
- Cassia crossbill at South Hills in Idaho

Conservation status
- Critically Imperiled (NatureServe)

Scientific classification
- Kingdom: Animalia
- Phylum: Chordata
- Class: Aves
- Order: Passeriformes
- Family: Fringillidae
- Subfamily: Carduelinae
- Genus: Loxia
- Species: L. sinesciuris

Binomial name
- Loxia sinesciuris Benkman, 2009

= Cassia crossbill =

Species of bird

The Cassia crossbill (Loxia sinesciuris) is a passerine bird in the family Fringillidae. It is endemic to the South Hills and Albion Mountains in southern Idaho. Cassia crossbill rarely interbreeds with other call types that move into the South Hills of Idaho yearly, and can be considered to represent a distinct species via ecological speciation. The Cassia crossbill have specialized beaks to access the seeds of the lodgepole pine cones in this region, but are poorly adapted to other pine cones in surrounding regions.

The species was first described in 2009, but only was accepted to be its own species in 2017, when it was found out to be phylogenetically distinct from the red crossbill, and its 10 unique call types.

== Description ==
The Cassia crossbill shares many physical features with the red crossbill and all of its different call types. Adult males display a brick red plumage along its crown, breast, and belly, while its flight feathers have a brown colour. In contrast, adult females have an overall dull green or olive-yellow colour, with brown flight feathers. Its defining feature, a crossed bill, is a crisscrossed bill used to access the pine cone seeds. However, in relation to the red crossbill call types, the Cassia crossbill has a deeper and thicker bill to crack open the harder pine cones in its habitat. Its body mass ranges from 29.2 to 43.9 g, while its wing length 85.0–100.0 mm and bill depth 8.90–10.56 mm.

== Habitat and distribution ==
The Cassia crossbill is found year-round primarily in the forests of the South Hills and Albion Mountains in South Idaho. Records of Cassia Crossbills have been documented in E-bird from California, Wyoming and a small but permanent population in Colorado. Compared to its counterpart, the red crossbill, which is a global species, the total area the Cassia crossbill resides in equates to about 67 km^{2}. They are almost exclusively found in mature and old-growth lodgepole pine dominated forests that do not have American red squirrels as their beak is adapted for a specific type of pine cone. This has led to a coevolutionary arms race with the lodgepole pine, which explains why they are confined in such a small area. Other Red Crossbill call types, typically call type 2 & 5, are also found in these areas, but seldom breed here due to being poorly adapted to the pine cone structure. Due to their restricted range and habitat, there is a cause for concern for this species survival.

== Taxonomy ==
The Cassia crossbill (Loxia sinesciuris) was first described in 2009 as the South Hills crossbill, but The American Ornithologists' Union (AOU) failed to find consensus on the issue of splitting the species from the red crossbill in 2009. The genus "Loxia" means crosswise, while "sinesciuris" means "without squirrel". Initially, it was considered one of the Red Crossbills' 10 call types, which had different vocalizations, bill size and were foraging for different conifer species. The idea of reproductive isolation between call types was suggested, but direct evidence was lacking. In 2007, some analyses found that different call types were genetically different including the South Hills crossbill (call type 9). Furthermore, evidence suggested that the South Hills crossbill was in a coevolutionary arms race with the lodgepole pine, further leading to habitat isolation. In 2016, it was identified as phylogenetically distinct from the other call types. This is an example of sympatric speciation. In 2017, the AOU reached a consensus and split the South Hills crossbill from the red crossbill and rename it the Cassia crossbill, because its habitat resided in Cassia County, Idaho.

== Behaviour ==
=== Diet ===
The Cassia crossbill will exclusively forage for lodgepole pine cones that are found in the South Hills and Albion Mountains region. A primary reason why this species of crossbill can exist in such a small area and on a singular food source is due to the lack of squirrels, the usual primary seed dispersal of the lodgepole pine. As a result, serotinous cones are especially abundant in this region, which allows cones with seeds to accumulate in high quantities that will last for decades. This has led to a coevolutionary arms race between the crossbill and lodgepole pine, as the Cassia crossbill is the primary selective agent. In result, the lodgepole pine are creating cones with thick-scaled cones, whilst the crossbills have evolved deeper bills to counter this. The seeds of younger serotinous cones (1–10 years) are harder for the crossbill to pry open due to them being strongly bonded together. It is the older and weathered cones that are more readily accessible as the scales begin to separate. The Cassia crossbill will mainly eat seeds from cones on the pine tree itself, but fallen cones are also foraged on as well. The crossbill will use its beak to pry the cone open and then it will use its tongue to obtain the seed. The crossbill will then use a groove inside its mouth to shell the seed to eventually eat it.

=== Vocalizations ===
As mentioned previously, the red crossbill had 10 different call types and the Cassia crossbill was call type 9. The Cassia Crossbill fledgling initially imitates its parents' flight calls and eventually will modify its call to imitate their mate. Compared to the other call types, the Cassia crossbills songs will be more repetitive while using fewer syllables. The individual notes of the song are typically buzzier and will have multiple instances of silence in between call phrases. Their song consists of strained and sharp chip and kip calls. Occasionally when red crossbills forage, there will be overlap between different call types. It is believed that crossbills used the public information of different calls to forage. This eventually led to assortative flocking when crossbills would follow vocalizations that would provide them the easiest route to food. This can be another mechanism to how the Cassia crossbill diverged from the red crossbill.

=== Reproduction ===
The Cassia crossbill and the other red crossbill call types will strongly associate with their own call types. Between 2001 and 2006, less than 1% of Cassia crossbills paired with other call types. Compared to the red crossbill call types, which are opportunistic breeders throughout most of the year, the Cassia crossbill will consistently breed from March through July. They tend to build their cup-shaped nests in April, using twigs, grasses and needles. Courtship of the crossbills involves the male attracting the female by singing, flying and feeding them with pine seeds. Males will aggressively defend the female from other breeding males after copulation successfully occurs. Females will lay 2–6 eggs and they will incubate the eggs for 12–16 days.

== Conservation and status ==
The current total population estimation is ≈5,800 individuals. Since the Cassia crossbill is a new species, the conservation status of this species has not been assessed yet. However, under the IUCN Red list criteria, it qualifies to be considered critically endangered due to its limited home range, small population and probable habitat degradation. A major threat to the crossbill is climate change. The cumulative hot weather (>32 °C) can result into the early dispersal of the pine cone seeds, thus limiting the food availability for the crossbill. Because of warmer weather, another threat are mountain pine bark beetle infestations. They will burrow in the pine trees and subsequently kill them, which can further exacerbate the food security problem for these birds. The potential for large fires increases every year due to climate change, which can prove disastrous for the crossbills if a significant portion of the pine trees die. It is projected that the lodgepole pines will disappear from the South Hills and Albion Mountains by the end of the century. The species may already lose potentially half its population due to the pending consequences of the 2020 Western United States wildfires, one of which engulfed a large portion of the South Hills, one of the only two strongholds for the bird.
