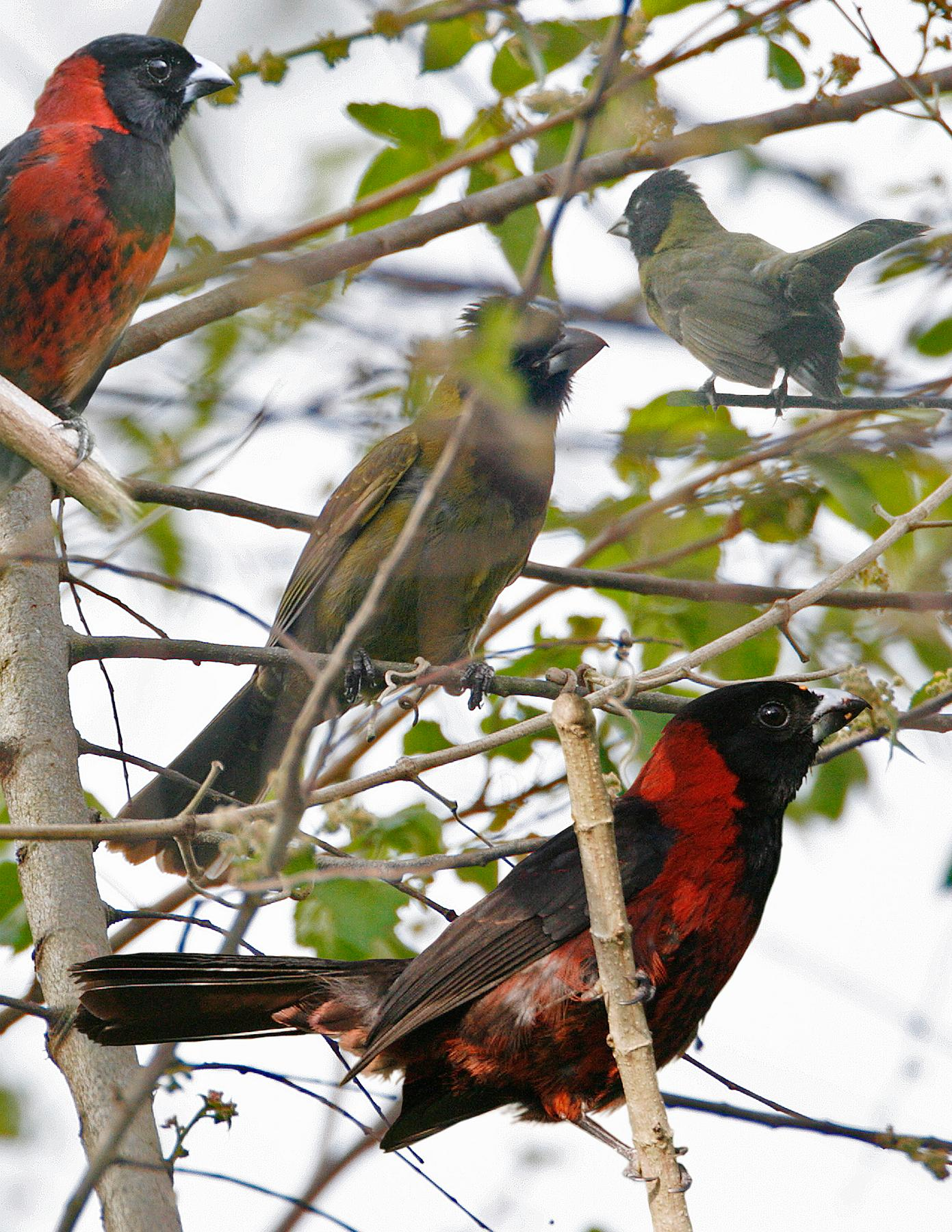

Conservation status
- Least Concern (IUCN 3.1)

Scientific classification
- Kingdom: Animalia
- Phylum: Chordata
- Class: Aves
- Order: Passeriformes
- Family: Cardinalidae
- Genus: Periporphyrus
- Species: P. celaeno

Binomial name
- Periporphyrus celaeno (Deppe, 1830)

= Crimson-collared grosbeak =

Species of bird

The crimson-collared grosbeak (Periporphyrus celaeno) is a species of bird in the family Cardinalidae, the cardinals, grosbeaks, and “tanager” allies. It is endemic to Mexico but has occurred several times as a vagrant in southern Texas in the U. S.

== Taxonomy and systematics ==
The crimson-collared grosbeak was formally described in 1830 with the binomial Tanagra Celaeno [sic]. Its further taxonomy is unsettled.

The crimson-collared grosbeak was long placed as the only species in genus Rhodothraupis. By 2026 most taxonomic systems had placed it in genus Periporphyrus with the red-and-black grosbeak (P. erythromelas). However, BirdLife International's Handbook of the Birds of the World (HBW) places it in genus Caryothraustes.

The crimson-collared grosbeak is monotypic.

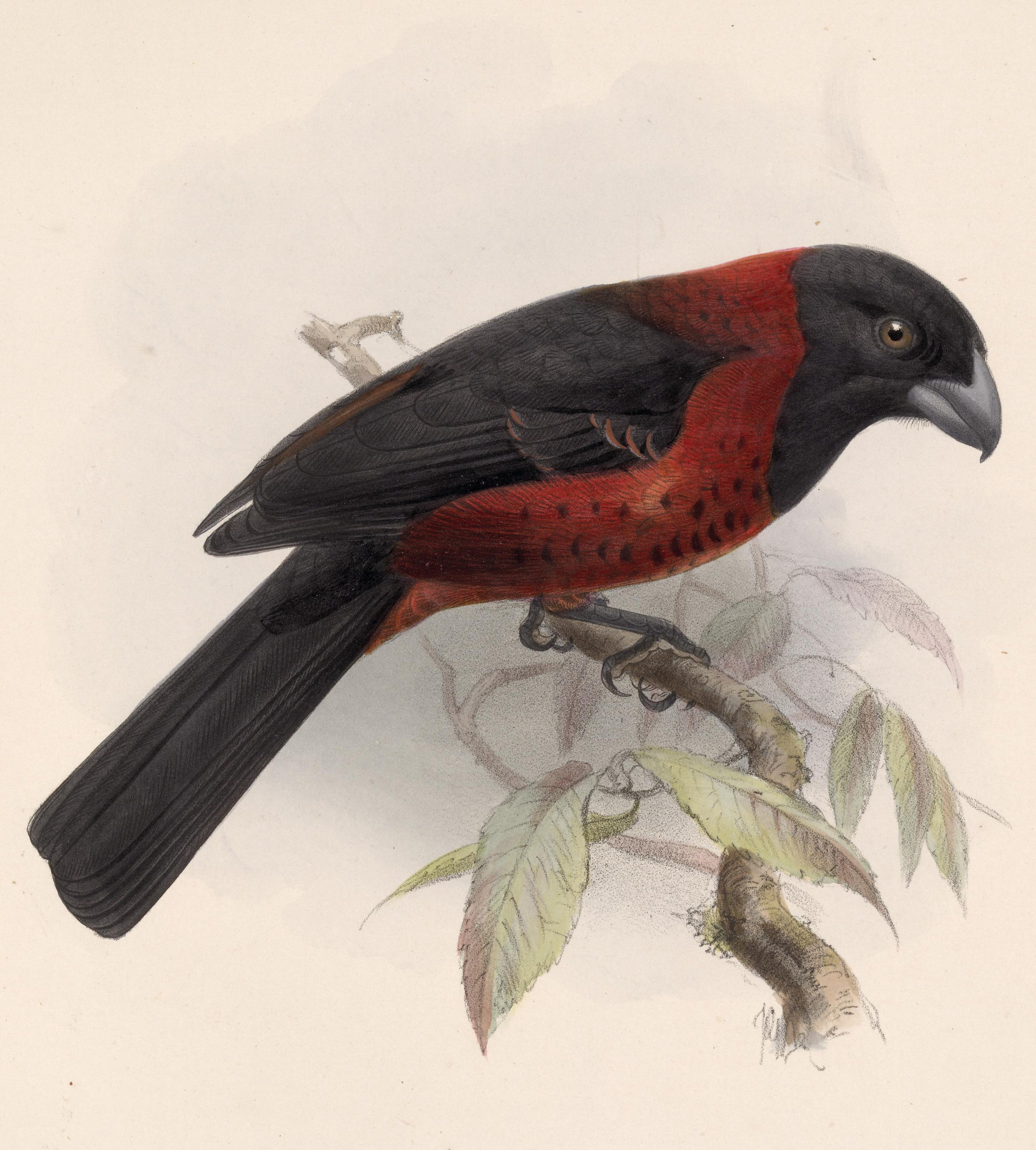
Crimson-collared grosbeak from Biologia Centrali-Americana

== Description ==
The crimson-collared grosbeak is 21 to 22 cm (8.3 to 8.7 in) long; one female weighed 60 g (2.1 oz). The species is sexually dimorphic. Adult males have a black head, throat, and upper breast. Their nape is dark crimson, their mantle deep crimson, and their back and rump black with crimson feather edges. Their wings are blackish with very thin dark crimson edges on the coverts. Their tail is black. Their underparts below the upper breast are dark crimson with some black mottling in the center of the lower breast. They have a brown iris, a pale blue-grey maxilla with a blackish tip and tomium, a blackish mandible with a blue-grey base, and grey legs and feet. Adult females have a similar pattern to males but where the males are crimson, females are olive on the upperparts and olive-yellow on the underparts. Their wings and tail are olive-green. They have a black bill with a blue-grey base to the mandible.

== Distribution and habitat ==
The crimson-collared grosbeak is found on the Gulf slope of Mexico from central Nuevo León and southern Tamaulipas south to northeastern Puebla and northern Veracruz. There are also many reports from the Lower Rio Grande Valley in Texas. It inhabits semi-arid to humid woodlands and secondary forest and is also found in citrus groves. Sources differ slightly on its elevational range. Two state it is from sea level to 1,200 m (3,900 ft) and a third gives its upper limit as 1,250 m (4,100 ft).

== Behaviour ==
=== Movement ===
The crimson-collared grosbeak is generally a sedentary year-round resident in Mexico. Most of its records as a vagrant in Texas are in winter but the first was in mid-summer.

=== Feeding ===
The crimson-collared grosbeak feeds largely on leaves but includes insects and both wild and cultivated fruits in its diet. It is not known to feed on seeds. It forages at all levels of its habitat, typically singly or in pairs, and sometimes joins mixed-species feeding flocks.

=== Breeding ===
The crimson-collared grosbeak's breeding season has not been defined but is known to include May. The only described nest was a cup made loosely from twigs without a lining. It was about 2 m (7 ft) above the ground in a shrub with a tangle of vines. The clutch is two to three eggs that are pale bluish grey with light brown spots. Only the female is known to care for young. Nothing else is known about the species' breeding biology.

=== Vocalisation ===
The crimson-collared grosbeak's song is "a rich to slightly burry warble, often upslurred at end" and its calls include a "high, clear, penetrating slurred sseeuu or sseeeur, also a piercing seeip seeeiyu".

== Status ==
The IUCN has assessed the crimson-collared grosbeak as being of Least Concern. It has a large range; its estimated population of at least 20,000 mature individuals is believed to be decreasing. No immediate threats have been identified. It is "Fairly common to uncommon over much of [its] range [and] appears able to adapt to some habitat modification."
