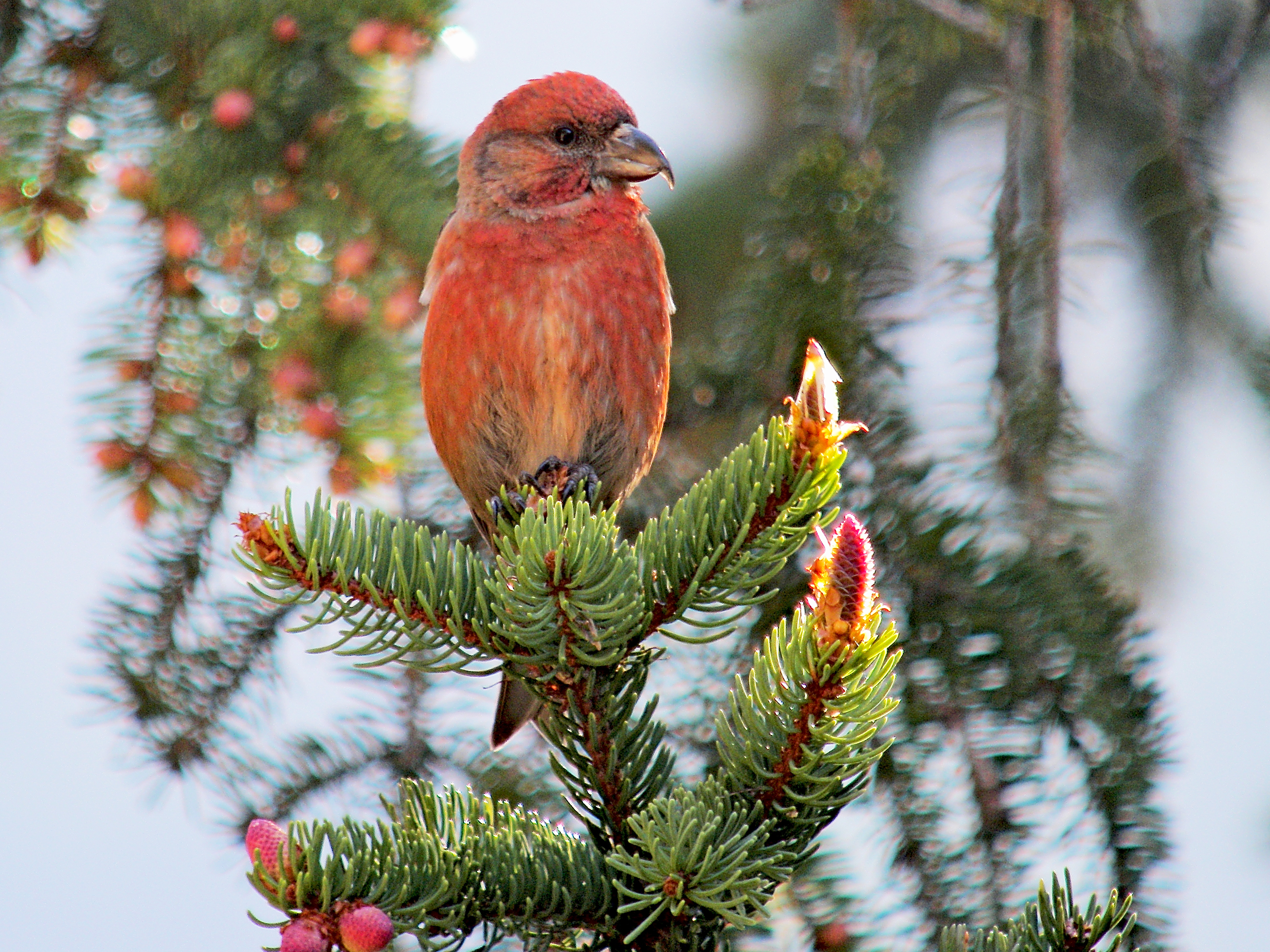
- Red crossbill or common crossbill (Loxia curvirostra)

Scientific classification
- Kingdom: Animalia
- Phylum: Chordata
- Class: Aves
- Order: Passeriformes
- Family: Fringillidae
- Subfamily: Carduelinae
- Genus: Loxia; Linnaeus, 1758

Type species
- Loxia curvirostra

Species
- Loxia curvirostra Loxia leucoptera Loxia megaplaga Loxia pytyopsittacus Loxia scotia Loxia sinesciuris †Loxia patevi

= Crossbill =

Genus of birds

Crossbills are birds of the genus Loxia within the finch family (Fringillidae), with five or six extant and one extinct species. These birds are distinguished by their mandibles with crossed tips, which gives the group its English name. Adult males tend to be red or orange, and females green or yellow, but there is much variation; some females, and juveniles, are greyish-green; juveniles are also streaked dark-on-pale.

Crossbills are specialist feeders on conifer cones, and the unusual bill shape is an adaptation which enables them to extract seeds from cones. These birds are typically found in higher northern hemisphere latitudes, where their food sources grow, but extending into the tropics in Central America, Hispaniola, Vietnam, and the Philippines. They irrupt out of the breeding range when the cone crop fails. Crossbills breed very early in the year, often in winter months, to take advantage of maximum cone supplies.

== Systematics and evolution ==
The genus Loxia was introduced by the Swedish naturalist Carl Linnaeus in 1758 in the 10th edition of his Systema Naturae. The name is from the Ancient Greek loxos, "crosswise". The Swiss naturalist Conrad Gessner had used the word Loxia for a crossbill in 1555 in his Historiae Animalium. The type species was designated as Loxia curvirostra (red crossbill) by George Robert Gray in 1840.

Analysis of mitochondrial cytochrome b sequence data indicates that the crossbills share a common ancestor with the redpoll, which diverged during the Tortonian (c. 8 mya, Late Miocene). Early research suggested that the genera Loxia and Carduelis might be merged into a single genus, for which the name Loxia would then have priority. But this would imply changing the name of a large number of species, and given that the adaptations of the crossbills represent a unique evolutionary path (see Evolutionary grade), it was considered more appropriate to split up the genus Carduelis as had already been done during most of the 20th century. The fossil record of Loxia is restricted to a Late Pliocene (c. 2 mya) species, Loxia patevi, found at Varshets, Bulgaria.

The species of crossbills are difficult to separate, and care is needed even with the white-winged and Hispaniolan crossbills, the easiest. The other species are identified by subtle differences in head shape and bill size, and the identification problems formerly led to much taxonomic speculation, with some scientists considering that the parrot and Scottish crossbills and possibly the Hispaniolan and white-winged crossbills are conspecific. The identification problem is least severe in North America, where only the red, white-winged and (locally) Cassia crossbills occur, and (possibly) the most challenging in the Scottish Highlands, where three similar-looking species breed and the two-barred (known as white-winged in North America) is a possible vagrant.

Work on vocalisation in North America suggests that there are eight or nine discrete populations of red crossbill in that continent alone, which do not regularly interbreed and are (like the named species) adapted to specialise in different conifer species. While several ornithologists seem inclined to give these forms species status, no division of the American red crossbills has yet occurred, except for the splitting of the geographically isolated cassia crossbill in 2009. Preliminary investigations in Europe and Asia suggest an equal, if not greater, complexity, with several different call types identified; these call types being as different from each other as from the named species of the parrot and Scottish crossbills, suggesting either that they are valid species, or else that the parrot and Scottish crossbills may not be.

Early genetic research on their DNA failed to reveal any difference between any of the crossbills (including the morphologically distinct two-barred), with variation between individuals greater than any difference between the taxa. This led to the suggestion that limited interbreeding between the different types prevented significant genetic differentiation, and enabled each type to maintain a degree of morphological plasticity, which may be necessary to enable them to feed on different conifers when their preferred food species has a crop failure. Research in Scotland, however, has shown that the parrot and Scottish crossbills are largely reproductively isolated from each other and also from the red crossbill, despite irruption of that species into their ranges, and the diagnostic calls and bill dimensions have not been lost. They are arguably therefore good species. Hybridisation is however known to occur at least occasionally, with mixed pairs being found.

More detailed recent evidence has shown five main genetic groups, with, notably, the red crossbills in the two continents paraphyletic with respect to Scottish, parrot, and cassia crossbills:

- Eurasian 'red' crossbills (including Scottish and parrot crossbills)
- North American 'red' crossbills (including cassia crossbill)
- Eurasian 'wingbarred' crossbills
- North American 'wingbarred' crossbills
- Hispaniolan 'wingbarred' crossbills

Currently accepted species and their preferred food sources are:

Image	Scientific name	Common name	Subspecies	Food source	Distribution of species
	Loxia pytyopsittacus	Parrot crossbill	Monotypic	Scots pine (Pinus sylvestris)	Northern, Eastern, and Central Europe
	Loxia scotica	Scottish crossbill	Monotypic	Scots pine (Pinus sylvestris) and larch (Larix) species (particularly plantations of L. decidua)	Scotland
	Loxia curvirostra	Red crossbill (North America) or common crossbill (Eurasia)	19–20 subspecies in two groups	Spruce (Picea) species; some populations (distinct species?) on various pine (Pinus) species and (in western North America) Douglas-fir	Eurasia, North Africa, and North America
	Loxia sinesciuris	Cassia crossbill	Monotypic	Isolated population of the lodgepole pine (Pinus contorta subsp. latifolia)	South Hills and Albion Mountains, Idaho, United States
	Loxia leucoptera	White-winged crossbill (North America) or two-barred crossbill (Eurasia)	Two subspecies	Larch (Larix) species, particularly L. sibirica, L. gmelinii, L. laricina and (in North America) also hemlock (Tsuga)	Eurasia and North America
	Loxia megaplaga	Hispaniolan crossbill	Monotypic	Hispaniolan pine (Pinus occidentalis)	Hispaniola (Haiti and the Dominican Republic)
	†Loxia patevi	Loxia patevi	Unknown	Unknown	Fossils dated to the Late Pliocene are known from Varshets, Bulgaria

Scottish crossbill is not universally accepted as a distinct species; it is sometimes treated as a subspecies of common crossbill, on the grounds that it is less distinct than several other subspecies of common crossbill, such as the Cyprus subspecies L. curvirostra guillemardi, and is also indistinguishable in genetic makeup.

=== Historical taxonomy ===
Originally, Linnaeus also included many other species in his concept of Loxia, many of them other finches, but not all, such as the chestnut-backed sparrow-lark (Eremopterix leucotis), Java sparrow (Padda oryzivora) and northern cardinal (Cardinalis cardinalis)

== Feeding behaviour ==
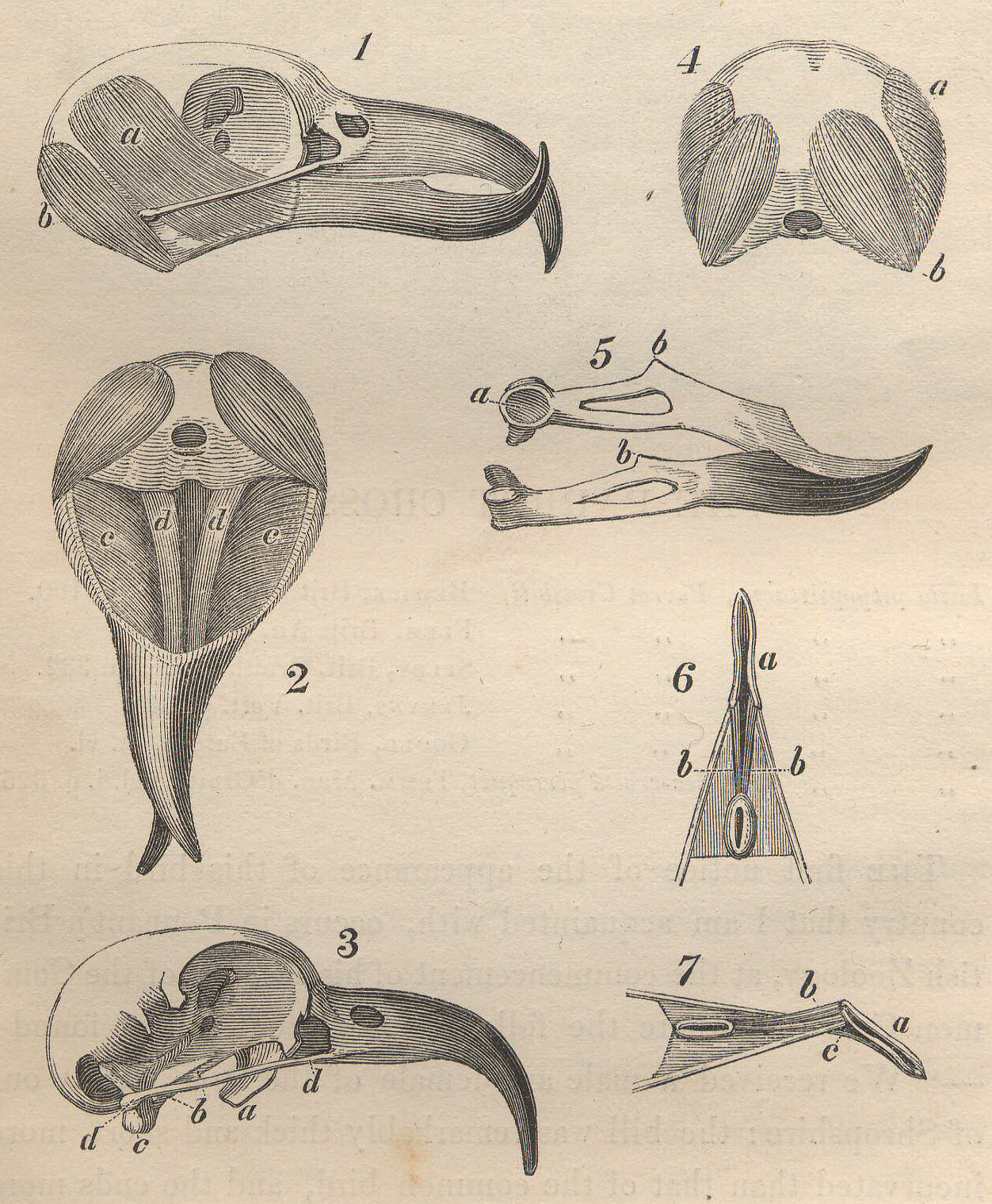
Red crossbill skull and jaw anatomy from William Yarrell's A History of British Birds (1843)

The different species specialise in feeding on different conifer species, with the bill shape optimal for opening that species of conifer. This is achieved by inserting the bill between the conifer cone scales and twisting the lower mandible towards the side to which it crosses, enabling the bird to extract the seed at the bottom of the scale with its tongue.

The mechanism by which the bill-crossing is developed (which usually, but not always, occurs in a 1:1 frequency of left-crossing or right-crossing morphs), and what determines the direction, has hitherto withstood all attempts to resolve it. There may be a genetic basis underlying the phenomenon; young birds whose bills are still straight will give a cone-opening behaviour if their bills are gently pressed, and the crossing develops before the birds are fledged and feeding independently, but at least in the red crossbill (the only species which has been somewhat thoroughly researched regarding this question) there is no straightforward mechanism of heritability. While the direction of crossing seems to be the result of at least three genetic factors working together in a case of epistasis and most probably autosomal, it is not clear whether the 1:1 frequency of both morphs in most cases is the result of genetics or environmental selection. Populations that feed on cones without removing or twisting them will likely show a 1:1 morph distribution, no matter what the genetic basis may be: the fitness of each morph is inversely proportional to its frequency in the population. Such birds can only access the cone with the lower mandible tip pointing towards it to successfully extract seeds, and thus a too high number of birds of one morph will result in the food availability for each bird of this morph decreasing.

They can use other conifers to their preferred, and may need to do so when their preferred species has a crop failure, but are less efficient in their feeding (not enough to prevent survival, but probably enough to reduce breeding success).

== Fossil record ==
Loxia patevi was described from the Late Pliocene of Varshets, Bulgaria.
