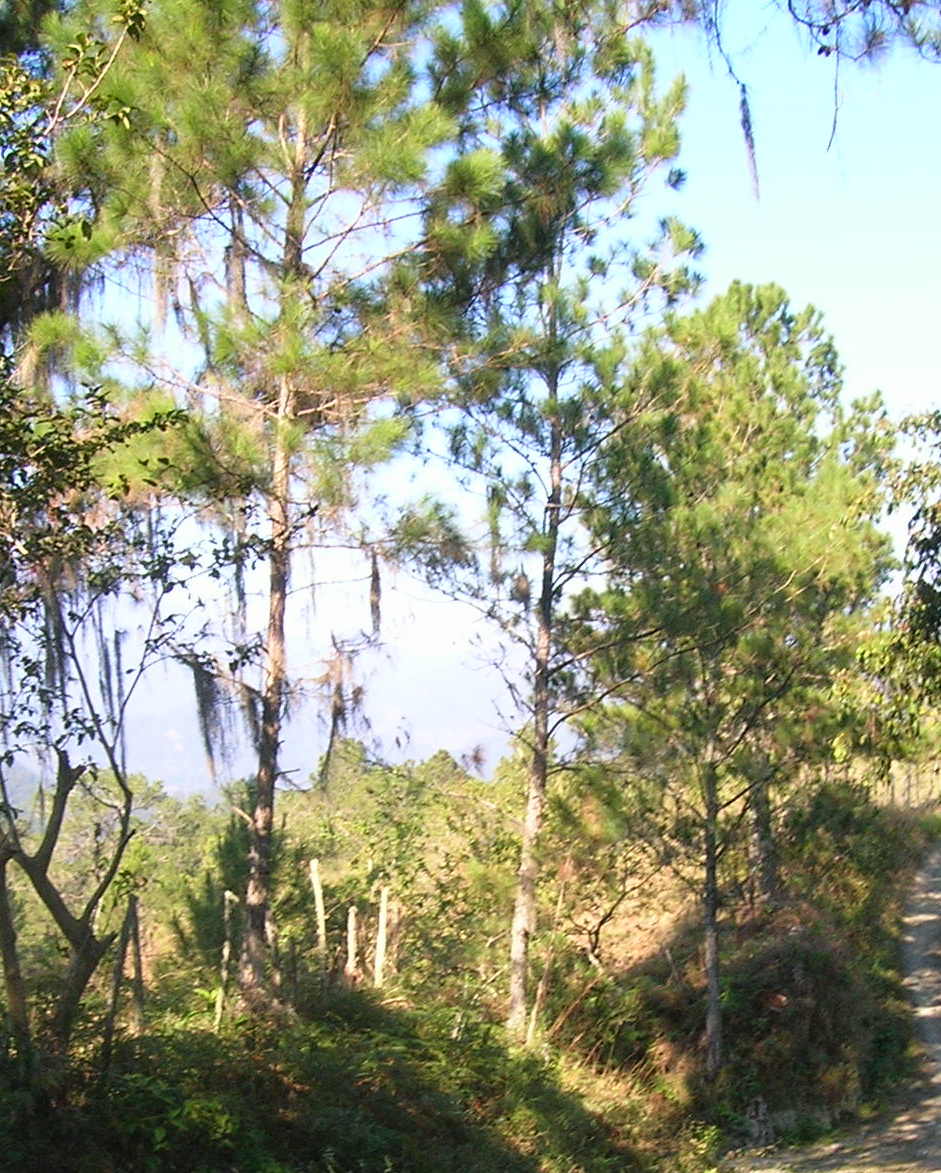
- Pinus occidentalis in Jarabacoa, Dominican Republic

Conservation status
- Endangered (IUCN 3.1)

Scientific classification
- Kingdom: Plantae
- Clade: Tracheophytes
- Clade: Gymnosperms
- Division: Pinophyta
- Class: Pinopsida
- Order: Pinales
- Family: Pinaceae
- Genus: Pinus
- Subgenus: P. subg. Pinus
- Section: P. sect. Trifoliae
- Subsection: P. subsect. Australes
- Species: P. occidentalis

Binomial name
- Pinus occidentalis Sw.
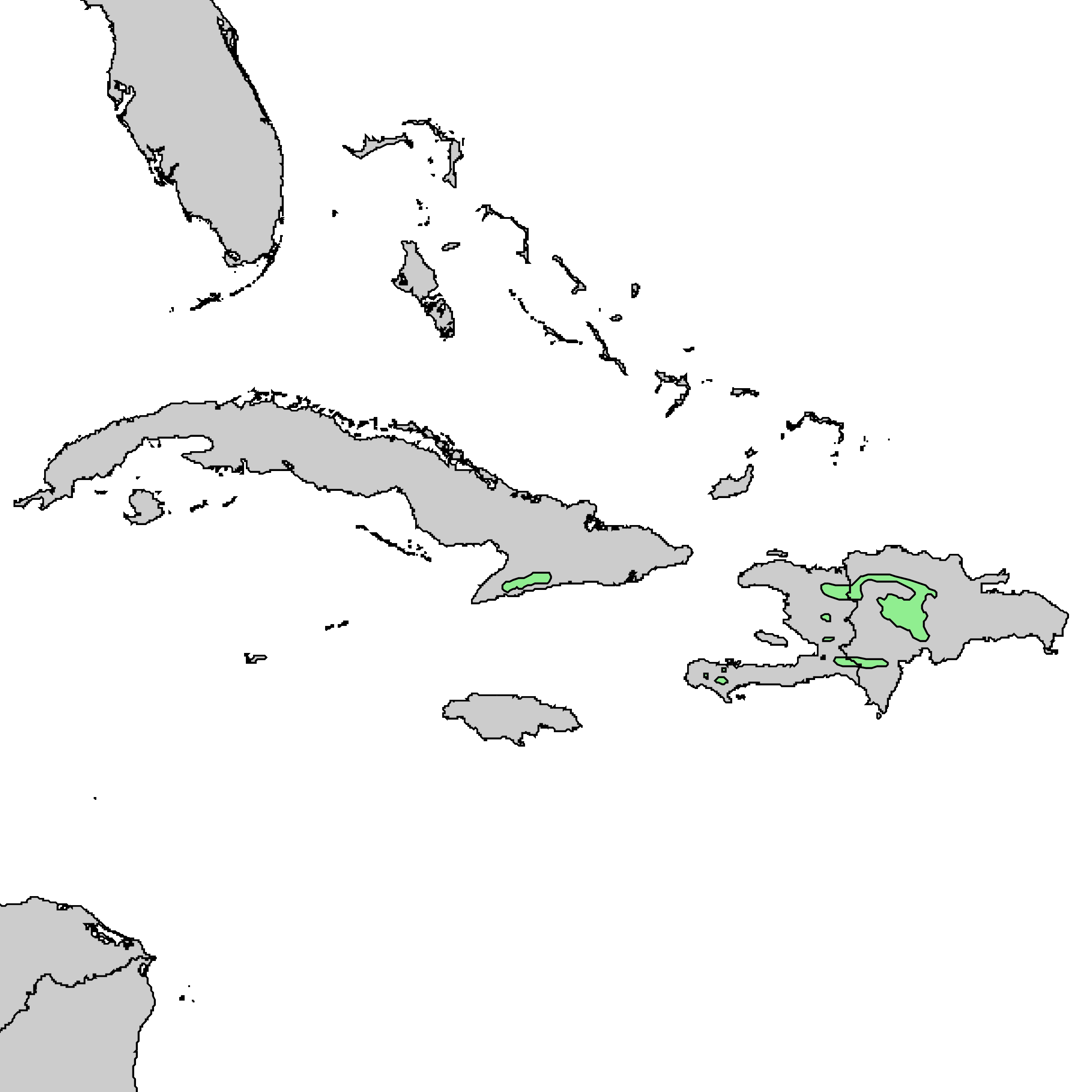
- Natural range of Pinus occidentalis

= Pinus occidentalis =

Species of pine tree endemic to Hispaniola in the Caribbean

Pinus occidentalis, the Hispaniolan pine, Hispaniola pine or pino criollo, is a species of conifer in the family Pinaceae, a pine tree endemic to the island of Hispaniola (split between the Dominican Republic and Haiti).

== Ecology ==
It is the eponymous species of the Hispaniolan pine forests ecosystem, in which it constitutes a majority of the biomass present. Another endemic species, the Hispaniolan crossbill (Loxia megaplaga), feeds almost exclusively on the cones of P. occidentalis.
