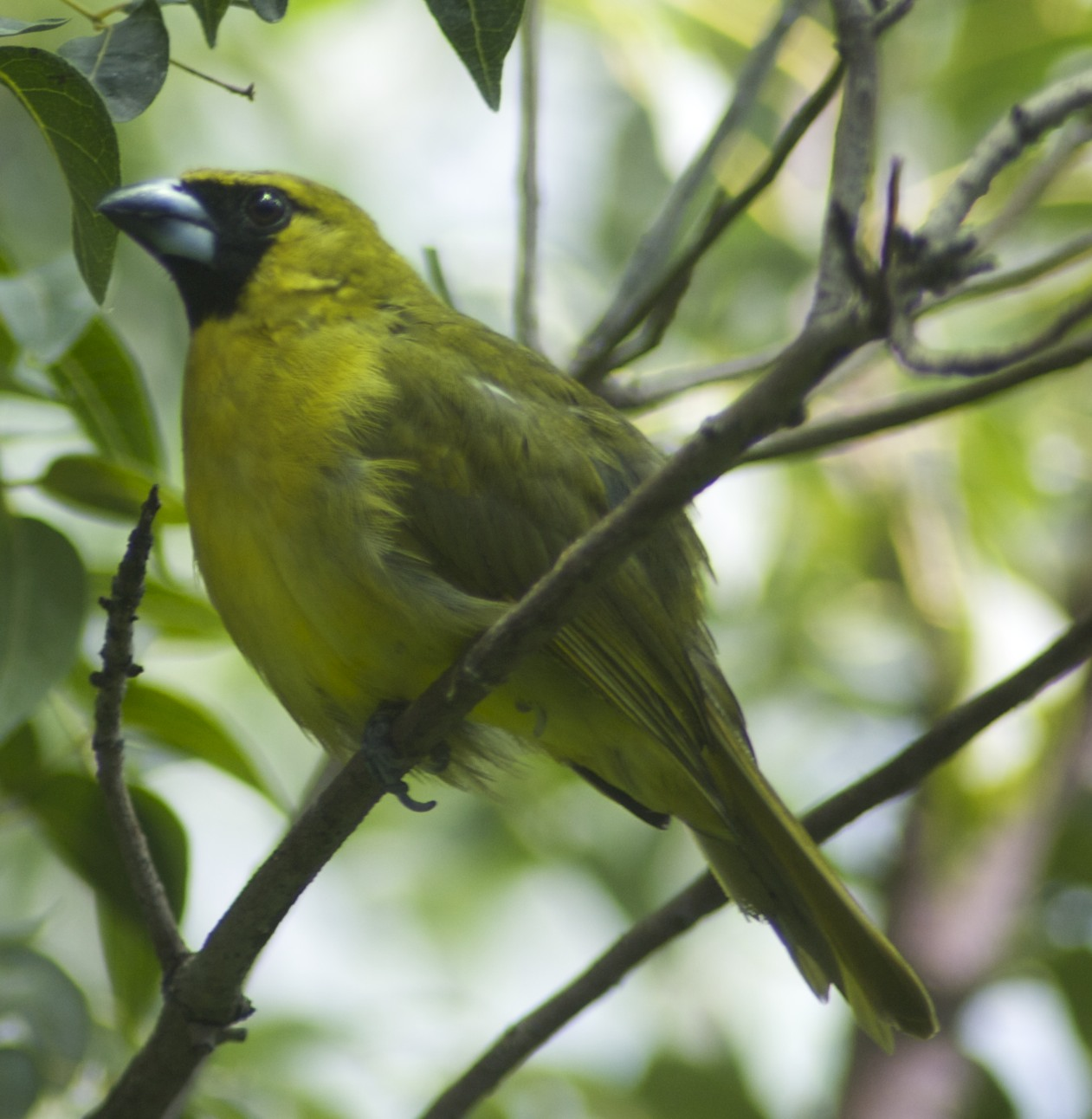
- Black-faced grosbeak (Caryothraustes poliogaster)

Scientific classification
- Kingdom: Animalia
- Phylum: Chordata
- Class: Aves
- Order: Passeriformes
- Family: Cardinalidae
- Genus: Caryothraustes; Reichenbach, 1850

Type species
- Coccothraustes viridis = Loxia canadensis Linnaeus, 1766

= Caryothraustes =

Genus of birds

Caryothraustes is a genus of grosbeak in the family Cardinalidae.

The genus was introduced by the German naturalist Ludwig Reichenbach in 1850. The type species was subsequently designated as the yellow-green grosbeak. The name Caryothraustes combines the Ancient Greek words karuon "nut" and thraustēs "breaker".

== Extant Species ==
The genus contains the following two species:

Genus Caryothraustes – Reichenbach, 1850 – two species
Common name	Scientific name and subspecies	Range	Size and ecology	IUCN status and estimated population
Yellow-green grosbeak	Caryothraustes canadensis (Linnaeus, 1766)	Brazil, Colombia, French Guiana, Guyana, Panama, Suriname, and Venezuela	Size: Habitat: Diet:	LC
Black-faced grosbeak	Caryothraustes poliogaster (Du Bus de Gisignies, 1847)	Central America	Size: Habitat: Diet:	LC
