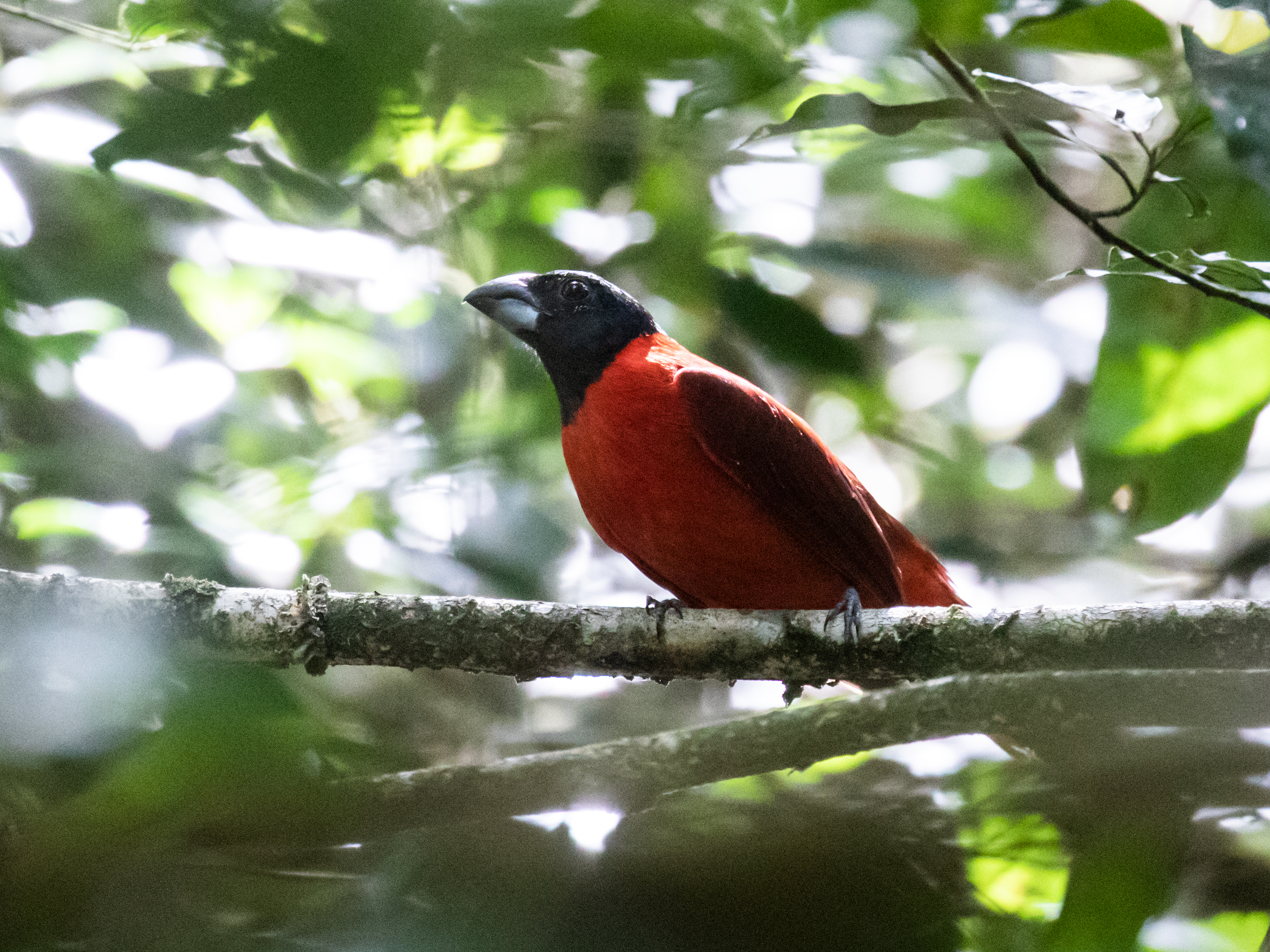
- Red-and-black grosbeak (Periporphyrus erythromelas)

Scientific classification
- Kingdom: Animalia
- Phylum: Chordata
- Class: Aves
- Order: Passeriformes
- Family: Cardinalidae
- Genus: Periporphyrus; Reichenbach, 1850

Type species
- Loxia erythromelas Gmelin, JF, 1789

= Periporphyrus =

Genus of birds

Periporphyrus is a genus of grosbeaks in the cardinal family Cardinalidae.

The genus was introduced by the German naturalist Ludwig Reichenbach in 1850. The type species was subsequently designated as the red-and-black grosbeak. The name Periporphyrus combines the Ancient Greek peri meaning "exceedingly" with porphureos meaning "rosy".

The genus contains the following two species:

Genus Periporphyrus – Reichenbach, 1850 – two species
Common name	Scientific name and subspecies	Range	Size and ecology	IUCN status and estimated population
Crimson-collared grosbeak Male Female	Periporphyrus celaeno (Deppe, 1830)	Mexico (central Nuevo León and central Tamaulipas south to northern Veracruz)	Size: Habitat: Diet:	LC
Red-and-black grosbeak Male	Periporphyrus erythromelas (Gmelin, JF, 1789)	Brazil, French Guiana, Guyana, Suriname, and Venezuela	Size: Habitat: Diet:	LC
