= Solveig =

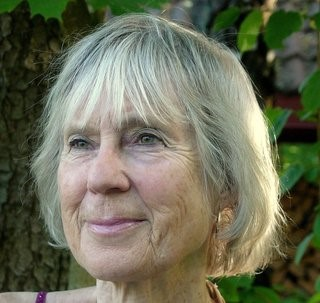
Norwegian radio journalist and non-fiction author Solveig Bøhle

Solveig (Urban East Norwegian: [ˈsûːɽvæɪ], Swedish: [ˈsǔːlvɛj]) is a female given name of Old Norse origin. It is most common in Denmark, Norway, Sweden, and Iceland, and it is also somewhat common in Germany and France.

== Etymology ==
The name consists of two parts, where both parts have different theorized origins.

- Sol-
  - Old Norse salr "house, hall, home"
  - Old Norse sól "sun"
  - Old Norse sölr "sun-coloured, yellow"
- -veig
  - Old Norse veig "strength"
  - Old Norse víg "battle"
  - Old Norse vígja "to butt"
  - Old Norse väg "way"

== Versions ==
Generally speaking, the most common version is Solveig. However, alternative versions are used in Norway, Sweden, Denmark, Iceland, Germany, Latvia, and on the Faroe Islands, and to some extent in France.

Norwegian, Swedish, and Danish

- Solveig
- Sólveig
- Solvej
- Solvei
- Solveij
- Solveg

Icelandic

- Solveig
- Sólveig

Latvian and Lithuanian

- Solveiga

German and French

- Solveig

== In fiction ==
Solveig is a central character in the play Peer Gynt by Henrik Ibsen. She sings the famous "Solveig's Song" in Edvard Grieg's musical suite of the same name. Ibsen uses sun imagery in association to the character (scene 10, act 5), indicating that Ibsen may have favored the idea that the name is etymologically associated with the sun.

There is also a female central character in the Argentine novelist Leopoldo Marechal's Adán Buenosayres named Solveig Amundsen. Furthermore, Solveig is the main character and narrator of Matthew J. Kirby's Icefall.

Solveig is also one of the protagonists in the video game Battlefield V, in the episode called "Nordlys".

A character named Solvieg is the protagonist of the albums Solveig, Emerald Seas, and Gods of Debauchery by American symphonic metal band Seven Spires.

== Notable people called Solveig ==
- Miklabæjar-Solveig, an Icelandic woman who lived in the late 18th century and is the subject of local folklore

=== Given name ===
- Sólveig Anspach, an Icelandic-French film director
- Solveig Christov, a Norwegian novelist, writer of short stories and playwright
- Solveig Dommartin, a French actress
- Solveig Egman-Andersson, a Swedish artistic gymnast and Olympian
- Solveig Guðjónsdóttir, an Icelandic geneticist and scientific journal author
- Solveig Guðmundsdóttir, an Icelandic heiress and landlady
- Solveig Gulbrandsen, a Norwegian footballer
- Solveig Gunbjørg Jacobsen
- Solveig Hedengran, a Swedish actress
- Solveig Heilo, also known as Sol Heilo, a Norwegian composer, artist, musician, music producer, arranger, designer
- Solveig Jülich, a Swedish historian of ideas, professor
- Solveig Krey, a Norwegian naval officer
- Solveig Kringlebotn, a Norwegian operatic soprano singer
- Solveig Løvseth, a Norwegian triathlete
- Solveig Nordlund, a Swedish-Portuguese filmmaker
- Solveig Nordström, a Swedish archaeologist who developed her career in Spain
- Sólveig Pétursdóttir, an Icelandic politician and former speaker of the Icelandic parliament
- Solveig Slettahjell, a Norwegian jazz singer
- Solveig Sollie, a Norwegian politician
- Solveig Sundborg, a Danish film actress
- Solveig Rogstad, a Norwegian biathlete
- Solveig Rönn-Christiansson, a Swedish politician
- Solveig Torsvik, a Norwegian politician
- Solveig Vestenfor, a Norwegian politician
- Solveig Vik (born 2003), Norwegian politician

=== Middle name ===
- Heide Solveig Göttner, a German fantasy writer

=== Surname ===
- Martin Solveig, a French DJ

== See also ==
- Gullveig
- Sól (Sun)
