= Meall a' Bhuachaille =

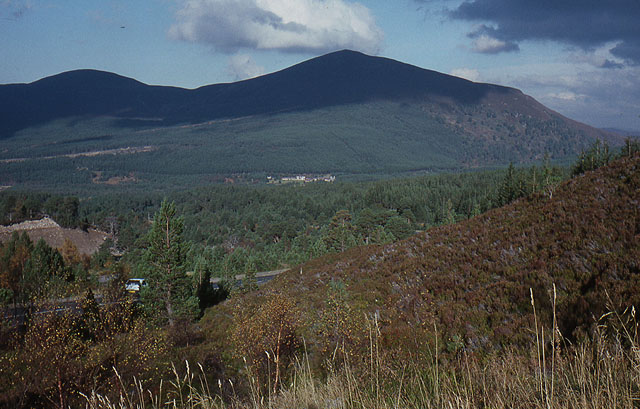
- Meall a' Bhuachaille

Highest point
- Elevation: 810 m (2,657 ft)
- Prominence: 436 m (1,430 ft)
- Listing: Marilyn, Corbett
- Coordinates: 57°11′01″N 3°40′16″W

Naming
- English translation: Mound of the herdsman
- Language of name: Gaelic

Geography
- Location within Scotland
- Location: Highland, Scotland
- Parent range: Cairngorms
- OS grid: NH991115
- Topo map: OS Landranger 36, Explorer 403

Meall a' Bhuachaille is a mountain in the Cairngorms in Scotland. It is situated 10 km east of Aviemore, to the north of Loch Morlich and Glenmore Forest.

== Ascent ==
The most popular route up Meall a' Bhuachaille starts from Loch Morlich. A path goes through the forest, and up onto the moor to the pass between Meall a' Bhuachaille and Creagan Gorm, then up to the summit. Another route is through the Ryvoan Pass, past An Lochan Uaine, to the Ryvoan bothy. From there, a path heads west up Meall a' Bhuachaille. The ascent of Meall a' Bhuachaille can also be combined with the summits of Creagan Gorm and Craiggowrie, which form a ridge to the west.

== Hill race ==
A hill running race has been held on Meall a' Bhuachaille for a number of years. The current route starts and finishes at Badaguish Outdoor Centre; the previous route was from Glenmore Lodge.

== See also ==
- List of geographical mealls
