= Aviemore and Coylumbridge Timber Railway (War Department) =

Disused railway line in Glenmore, Aviemore

The Aviemore and Coylumbridge Timber Railway was a light railway line in Scotland which ran from Aveimore to Glenmore that operated from 1917 until 1921.

The line opened in stages in 1917 during World War I. It was built by the War Office Directorate of Timber Supply to convey lumber for the war effort from the sawmills at Sluggan and Glenmore to the Highland Railway station at Aviemore.

The Light Railway continued in use after the war until the early 1920s when felling in the area ceased. The rails were in place until 1924 when they were mostly lifted.

== History ==
=== The Problem of Lumber ===
Prior to the outbreak of war, the UK had been reliant on imported timber for building and fuel, however, with the war and German blockades this supply of foreign lumber was cut off. With the war further increasing demand for wood, the war department turned to Britain's forests. One of the forests selected for cutting was in the Glenmore estate, owned by the Duke of Richmond and Gordon. Prior to the war there had been small timber railways on the Glenmore estate however the war operation would require a larger network. Two companies of The Canadian Forestry Corps (110th and 121st) and a section of foreign volunteers were brought in for the forestry work.

=== Railway for the Sluggan Cut ===
The first cut on the Glenmore estate was to be at a place called Gleann an t-Slugain or Glen Sluggan, formerly known as Glen Candlic. No. 110 Company of the Canadian Forestry Corps arrived in November, 1916, under a Major H. A. Calder. A camp and sawmill was established at the southern end of the glen. Workers were housed in Glemore lodge until the camp had been built. A light railway of a gauge of 3 inches was constructed from the camp up through the glen to bring timber to the sawmill at the camp. The line followed a burn called Allt Feithe Moire or Milton's Burn. Much of the line was built on timber trestles above and beside this river. From the camp the railway extended 2.5 miles into the Sluggan Glen. The line was mostly operated by horses and donkeys. At some points the grade was so steep that wagons had to be hauled by a rope operated by a stationary engine. Sluggan Camp and the Railway were in full operation by May 1917.

To transport the cut lumber from the Sluggan Camp to the Mainline Railway at Aviemore a further 5 miles of light railway was constructed. This line was operated by a single Bagnall 0-4-0ST steam locomotive. On its way to Aviemore the line passed through Coylumbridge and Rothiemurchus where some lumber workers were housed. At Coylumbridge the railway followed the road on the north side. The line passed south of Inverdruie sawmill although did not have a connection to it. Crossing the Spey, the railway joined up with the public road (now the pedestrian bridge). Over the bridge trains were restricted to a 4 mph speed limit, had to give priority to other road users and wagons had to be less than 4 tons when loaded. From here the line curved sharply north and went up a steep incline to Aviemore station. The morning train from Aviemore left around 6AM carrying forestry workers and made further stops at Rothiemurchus and Coylumbridge to pick up lumber workers and take on water for the locomotive.

Lumber shipments from the Sluggan Camp to Aviemore began on 19 October 1917 and ceased in April 1918. Following this No, 110 Company moved to a cut at Nethy Bridge. At Sluggan 50,000 trees were felled and transported to Aviemore.

=== The Glenmore Cut and Extension ===
No. 121 Company of the Canadian Forestry Corps under a Major Rousseau arrived to Glenmore and established a camp about a kilometer south of Glenmore lodge on 1 July 1917 and began logging work on 17 August 1917. On the 6th August 1918, after the 110th Company had left Sluggan, the 121st Company used the railway to make final shipments of already cut lumber from Sluggan to Aviemore. By the end August to early September 1918 the railway from Aviemore to Sluggan was extended to the Glenmore Camp over the north side of Loch Morlich. In December 1918 the line was extended to the Green Loch. In March 1919 all felling activity was ordered to stop.

At Glenmore 76,000 trees were felled and transported to Aviemore.

=== After the war ===
After the Canadian Forestry Corps left in 1919 the Directorate of Timber Supply (now under the Board of Trade) continued to cut timber in the area until 1922. Another steam locomotive ordered by the War Office arrived to work the line in mid 1919. During this time summer tourists to the area would ride empty wagons from Aviemore up the railway to Glenmore and come back down with the lumber.

In 1923 the Forestry Commission purchased the Glenmore estate from the Duke of Richmond and Gordon.

During the second world war the Norwegian Commando Kompani Linge trained in Glenmore and conducted sabotage practice blowing up old rails and timber trestles of the railway near Loch Morlich
