= 2026 Cairngorms wildfire =

Wildfire in Scotland

- Part of the 2026 United Kingdom wildfires
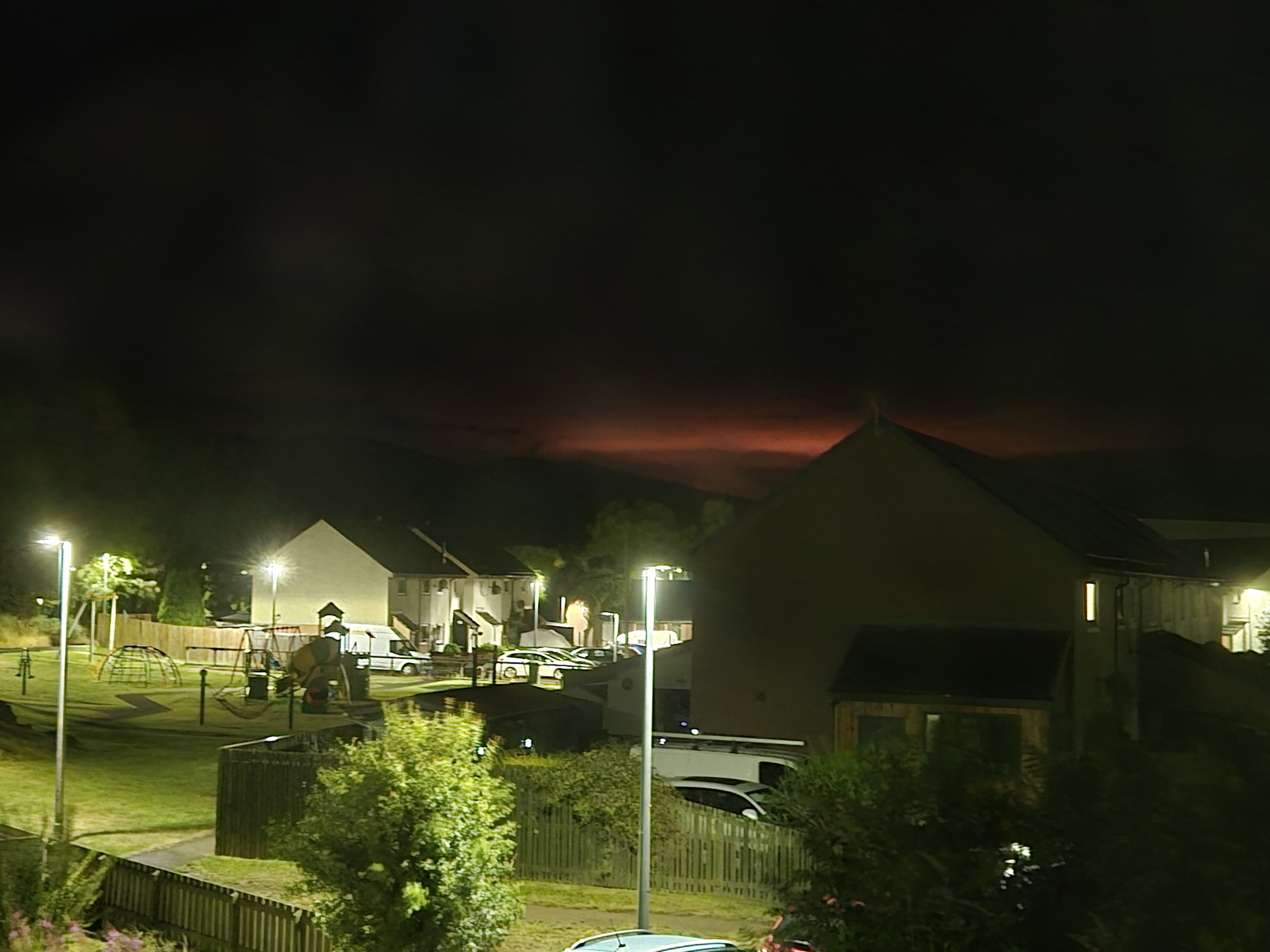
- View of the wildfire's glow from Aviemore (pictured 25 July)
- Date: 15 July 2026 –
- Location: Cairngorms, Scotland
- Coordinates: 57.1°N 3.65°W

Statistics
- Status: Extinguished
- Land use: National park

Impacts
- Evacuated: ~700, likely higher

Map
- Perimeter of 2026 Cairngorms wildfire (map data)
- Location of the fire in the Scottish Highlands 2026 Cairngorms wildfire (Scotland)

On 15 July 2026, a major wildfire broke out in the Cairngorms National Park in the Scottish Highlands. The wildfire spread and affected areas such as Glenmore and An Lochan Uaine, and caused significant damage to the Caledonian Forest, causing Scots Pine, a declining ancient tree species in the region, to be damaged or destroyed. It has been called "apocalyptic" in its scale and damage.

The wildfire lead to an evacuation of Glenmore, Badaguish, Cairngorm Mountain ski resort, and other camping sites in the surrounding region, with a flare-up later causing an evacuation of residents in Nethy Bridge.

Residents in the surrounding region considered the wildfire response and the declaration of a major incident too slow with residents in Nethy Bridge considered the evacuation plan disorganised. Another criticism was that the wildfire was reported numerous times as "under control", though it continued to spread.

The wildfire front grew to a recorded size of 25 kilometres (16 mi) wide by 27 July. No casualties were reported to have occurred.

== Events ==
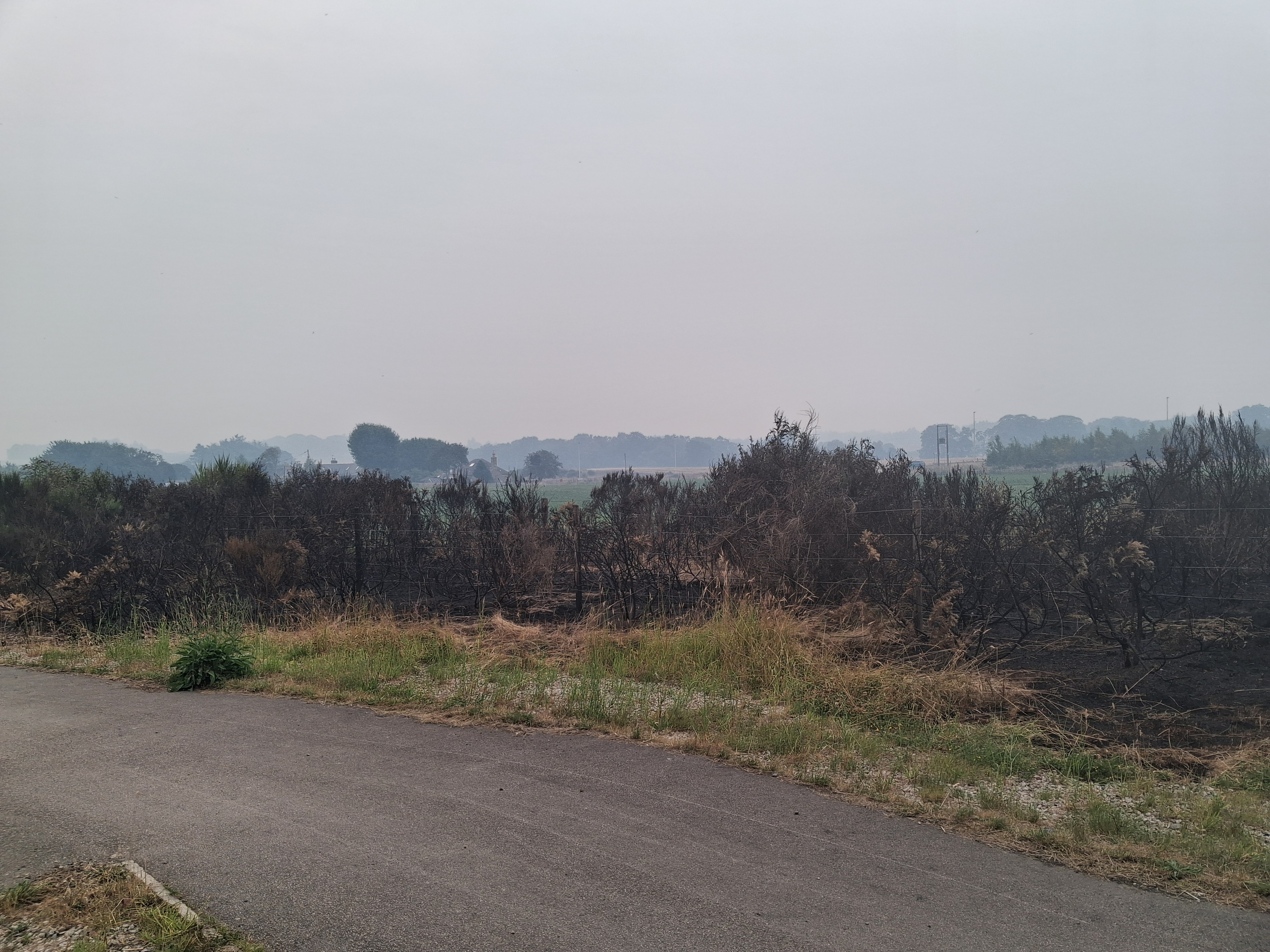
Wildfire smoke visible in Aberdeenshire (the damage in the foreground is from a different fire)

The fire originated near Ryvoan bothy near Nethy Bridge in heathland on 15 July. The wildfire continued to grow, and residents in Glenmore and Badaguish were evacuated because of the close proximity of the wildfire. On 16 July the International Charter Space and Major Disasters was activated by the Scottish Environment Protection Agency (SEPA), which provided wide albeit contingent humanitarian satellite coverage.

For the first two days the wildfire burned, helicopters could not be called to the scene because they were "preoccupied" with another wildfire occurring south of the border. Upon their arrival on the 17th, they began providing significant assistance in controlling the wildfire. On the same day, a high-volume water pump system was set up to drain from Loch Morlich to fill An Lochan Uaine to assist firefighting operations. Over 50 firefighters were reported to be attending the scene.

On 20 July, the wildfire was reported to be "largely surrounded", noting that the road leading to the Cairngorms would likely be blocked for a few days because of the firefighting equipment. Gamekeepers, farmers, local contractors and estate workers were also reported to have been of assistance to fire crews throughout.

On 24 July, winds picked up, causing the wildfire to rapidly burn and expand. The smoke reached Aberdeen and Aberdeenshire. The village of Nethy Bridge was evacuated that evening because of the increased proximity of the fire. They were allowed to return the following day. The wildfire was officially declared a major incident after the flare-up.

Rain fell in the area from 26 July, raising hopes that it would help begin to extinguish the fire. Firefighters continued to damp down hotspots as of 12 August.

== Government response ==
Many residents in the region considered the Scottish government's response to the wildfire to have been mishandled, chaotic and slow. Military support, which included non-water bombing helicopters and military battalions was rejected, with Minister Neil Gray stating that firefighters on the ground had the resources needed.

The Scottish Greens called for an emergency fund to be created to support residents and businesses affected by the wildfire.
