= Andreas Bjelland Eriksen =

Norwegian politician (born 1992)

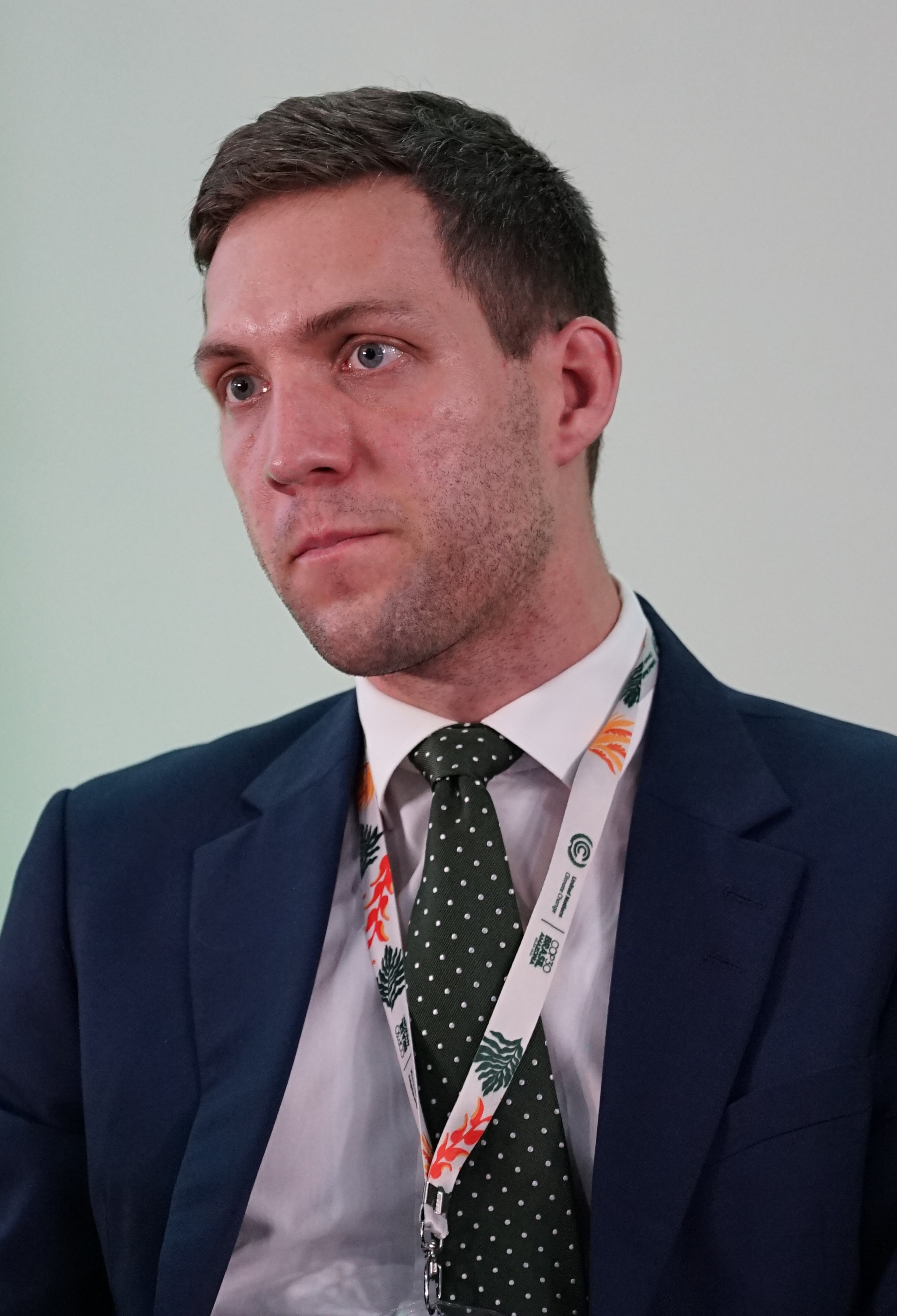
- Eriksen at COP30 in 2025

Minister of Climate and the Environment
- In office 16 October 2023 – 11 September 2026
- Prime Minister: Jonas Gahr Støre
- Preceded by: Espen Barth Eide
- Succeeded by: Sigrun Gjerløw Aasland

Member of the Storting
- Incumbent
- Assumed office 1 October 2025
- Deputy: Solveig Vik (2025–2026)
- Constituency: Rogaland

Personal details
- Born: 23 March 1992 (age 34) Stavanger, Rogaland, Norway
- Party: Labour
- Children: 2
- Education: Norwegian School of Economics; Bocconi University; University of Oslo
- Occupation: Economist; Politician

Andreas Bjelland Eriksen (born 23 March 1992) is a Norwegian economist and politician for the Labour Party. He served as the Minister of Climate and the Environment from October 2023 to September 2026 and a member of the Storting for Rogaland since 2025. He previously served as a state secretary from 2021 to 2023.

== Education ==
Bjelland Eriksen has studied business administration at the Norwegian School of Economics and the Bocconi University in Milan, and law studies at the University of Oslo.

== Political career ==
=== Youth league ===
Bjelland Eriksen was at Utøya during the 2011 Norway attacks, but survived alongside his cousin Vebjørn Bjelland Berg. He also led the Rogaland branch of the Workers' Youth League from 2010 to 2012.

=== Local politics ===
Bjelland Eriksen was a member of the Rogaland County Council from 2011 to 2019.

=== Parliament ===
Eriksen was elected to the Norwegian parliament, the Storting, at the 2025 election. While serving in government, Solveig Vik deputised for him from October 2025 to September 2026. After leaving government in 2026, he joined the Standing Committee on Finance and Economic Affairs and additionally became the party's second deputy parliamentary leader.

=== State secretary ===
Eriksen was appointed state secretary at the Office of the Prime Minister on 14 October 2021. On 1 August 2022, he was also appointed acting state secretary at the Ministry of Petroleum and Energy, standing in for Amund Vik, who was on parental leave. In November, his tenure was extended until 30 June 2023.

=== Minister of Climate and the Environment ===
He was appointed Minister of Climate and the Environment on 16 October 2023 in a cabinet reshuffle.

==== 2023 ====
A week after assuming office, he received the climate commission's (Klimautvalget 2050) report, which notably concluded that Norway's petroleum industry should gradually be phased out and that renewable energy production should be increased. Petroleum interest organisation, Offshore Norge, was notably critical of the report regarding phasing out the petroleum industry and noted that the industry has a plan for zero emissions by 2050.

Eriksen was part of the Norwegian delegation at the 2023 United Nations Climate Change Conference. Towards the end of the conference duration, he was critical of the final draft, in particular a paragraph regarding transition away from fossil fuels.

Just before Christmas, Eriksen announced that the government would be upholding the decision for the culling of Norwegian wolves within the designated wood zone in the period of 1 January to 15 February.

==== 2024 ====
In February, former minister Ola Borten Moe argued that the government's climate goals were unrealistic and would heavily affect the economy and people's spending. Eriksen argued the contrary and that experts supported the government's aim of reducing emissions with 55% by 2030, adding that according to them it would be reachable.

Eriksen hosted the EU's energy commissioner Kadri Simson during her visit to inspect water reservoirs in Eastern Norway in March.

Contrary to the Norwegian Environment Agency's concerns about the country not being able to reach 55% in emissions cuts by 2050 in their annual climate report in April; Eriksen expressed optimism for the goal to still be reachable. He highlighted that habits like travelling and eating would be challenging.

In July, Eriksen accused Finnish authorities of violating a bilateral fishing treaty between the two countries regarding the closure of the border river Tana for fishing in order to protect the local salmon population. This came after the two countries that spring had agreed to close the river in order to protect the salmon population, but Finland had recently opted to reopen the river for fishing.

It was announced on 23 August that Eriksen would go on paternal leave between 2 September and 31 December and that state secretary Tore O. Sandvik would be appointed as acting minister in his place.

==== 2025 ====
Eriksen announced in February that the government didn't consider products from Temu and Shein viable for Norwegian consumers due to their products containing toxic materials and that they didn't meet Norwegian production standards. He additionally claimed that their products aren't sustainable. A report by the Norwegian Environment Agency had also found toxic materials in eight of thirteen Temu products. Eriksen also encouraged Norwegians to stop buying products from Temu and Shein and also called for stricter checks and regulations on foreign import.

Eriksen shared concerns with the Norwegian Trekking Association in May about considerable intervention in nature and added that "we are essentially losing something that makes us proud to be Norwegian". He also expressed that the Labour Party would be campaigning on stopping further interventions in nature and making Norway "areal neutral" by 2040 "before it's too late".

Upon the failed attempt to present a new climate target for 2035 by the Presidency of the Council of the European Union in September, Eriksen stated that it was "unfortunate" that no agreement had been reached. He furthermore expressed optimism that an agreement could be reached in the next round of negotiations and emphasised the importance of cooperation within climate and environmental policy.

While visiting Sel Municipality in early October, Eriksen announced that the government would be spending 42 million NOK to expand areas for the mountain reindeers in an effort to protect their species. The plans has met local resistance, with the mayor and deputy mayor of Sel Municipality and local travel agencies arguing that it could hurt the tourism industry located in the areas the government are seeking to expand in favour of the mountain reindeers.

Eriksen was a part of the Norwegian delegation at the COP30 held in Belém, Brazil. As the negotiations went overtime, he expressed that the recent proposal wasn't good enough, citing that it didn't follow up on the Paris Agreement properly or strengthened climate policy going forwards.

==== 2026 ====
In February 2026, Eriksen defended the implementation of plastic wine bottles, arguing that it made it easier for wine to be transported and that it contributed to greater sustainability. This game after the Progress Party criticised the government for its implementation as "ridiculous symbol policies". Eriksen furthermore criticised the party for constantly opposing climate measures and argued that both glass and plastic bottles could be equally utilised.

He left the government in a cabinet reshuffle on 11 September 2026 and was succeeded by Sigrun Gjerløw Aasland.

== Personal life ==
He hails from Stavanger and is a son of former Stavanger Labour Party mayoral candidate Cecilie Bjelland. He has a younger brother, Jakob, who was with him during the 2011 Norway attacks and also survived. Eriksen is married and has two sons.
