= Ly Erg =

Fairy from Scottish folklore

Coordinates: 57°5′0″N 3°40′0″W

The Ly Erg is a fairy from Scottish folklore, particularly associated with the area in and around the Glenmore Forest, part of the present-day Cairngorms National Park. It is dressed as a soldier, distinguishable from a real soldier only by its red right hand, said to be stained with the blood of its victims. While out walking it will stop near water, and by raising its right hand challenge passersby to fight. But anyone who engages in combat with the Ly Erg will be dead within a fortnight, win or lose.

Writing in 1847, the antiquarian Joseph Robertson tells of three brothers who fought the Ly Erg, each of them dying immediately after their encounter.
