= Glenmore Forest Park =

Park in Highland, Scotland

Glenmore National Nature Reserve
- IUCN category IV (habitat/species management area)
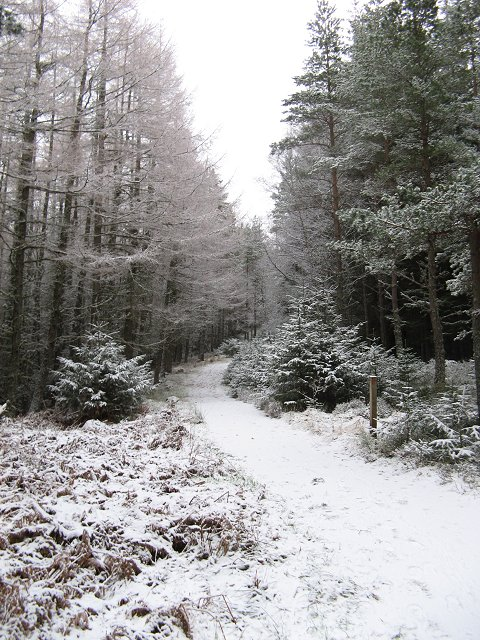
- Glenmore Forest

- Location within Highland
- Location: Highland, Scotland
- Coordinates: 57°10′12″N 3°42′58″W
- Area: 21.1 km^{2} (8.1 sq mi)
- Designation: NatureScot
- Established: 2007
- Owner: Forestry and Land Scotland
- Website: Glenmore Forest Park

Glenmore Forest Park is a remnant of the Caledonian Forest near Aviemore in the Badenoch and Strathspey district of Highland, Scotland. Owned and managed by Forestry and Land Scotland, it lies within the Cairngorms National Park, and is one of six forest parks in the country. The forest park, which was established in 1948, covers 35.7 km^{2}, of which 21.1 km^{2} is designated as a national nature reserve (NNR). Glenmore surrounds Loch Morlich, and is below the rise of the Cairngorms to the south; to the north the park extends to the summit of Meall a' Bhuachaille. The forest forms part of an expanse of Caledonian Forest that stretches from Glen Feshie to Abernethy, and which as a whole forms the largest single area of this habitat remaining in Scotland. It is home to much wildlife including Scottish crossbills, crested tits, capercaillie, narrow-headed ants, red squirrels and red deer.

The Sportscotland National Centre Glenmore Lodge is situated about 1.5 km east of Loch Morlich, and is surrounded by the park. During the Second World War the area was a training base for Norwegian resistance fighters, who are commemorated by a memorial located near to the visitor centre.

== Folklore ==
A fairy known as the Ly Erg, a portent of death, is said to frequent the area of the forest. According to local legends a small lake in the park, An Lochan Uaine, has its water coloured in green due to the fairies, who wash their green clothes in the lake.

== Flora and fauna ==
As a Caledonian Forest, the predominant tree species at Glenmore is Scots pine. Around half of the pines originate as a result of natural processes, whilst the remainder have been planted using seeds of local origin. Broadleaved species such as birch, willow and rowan are also present, and there are areas of juniper scrub and alder. Trees are expanding on to areas of open heath, and a natural tree line is developing at the upper edge of the forest. The forest floor is home to many species associated with native pinewoods including one-flowered wintergreen, twinflower, small cranberry and intermediate wintergreen.

Glenmore Forest is important for many bird species, especially Scottish crossbill and capercaillie. In 2006 Glenmore was identified as having the highest productivity of capercaillie for any monitored site in Scotland. Golden eagles can be seen over parts of the forest, and ospreys regularly hunt over Loch Morlich. Peregrine falcons and merlins also hunt in the area, and occasionally breed at Glenmore. Dotterel can occasionally be found on the higher parts of the area, above the tree line, although they normally prefer the open habitats of the mountain plateau. The rivers and lochs of the forest provide a home for otters, and are an important spawning area for Atlantic salmon.

== Conservation ==
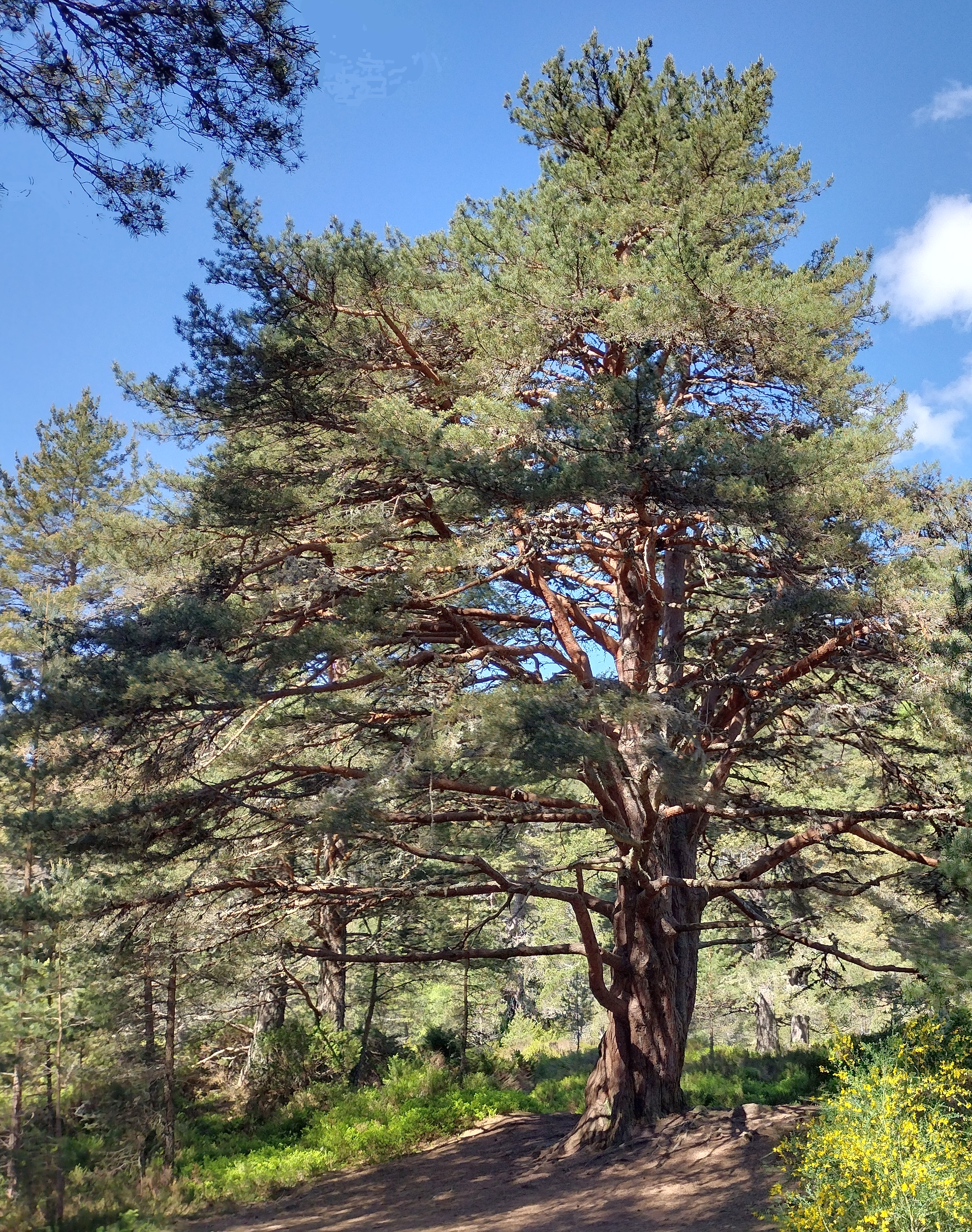
A Scots pine in the park

Extraction of timber from Glenmore dates back to at least the 17th century, with large scale extraction beginning in 1783. Felling continued into the 20th century, and the area was also used to graze sheep, and as a deer forest. During this period little tree regeneration occurred. The Forestry Commission acquired Glenmore in 1923, and began to restock the wood, using Scots pines and non-native species such as Norway spruce and Sitka spruce. The area was declared a forest park 1948, and became a national nature reserve in 2007. Forestry and Land Scotland now plan to remove all non-native tree species, and replant areas with Scots pine of local provenance and other native trees.

In addition to its status as a national nature reserve and a forest park Glenmore is also designated as a Site of Special Scientific Interest (SSSI), and forms part of the Cairngorms Special Protection Area (SPA). There are also two Special Areas of Conservation (SAC) that overlap with the NNR: the Cairngorms SAC and the River Spey SAC. The NNR is classified as a Category IV protected area by the International Union for Conservation of Nature.

In 2026, parts of Glenmore were affected by a major wildfire which led to approximately 25 square kilometres (9.7 sq mi) of landscapes across the wider region being damaged.

== See also ==
- Caledonian Forest
- Forestry and Land Scotland
- Beglan, an abandoned township in Glenmore.
