= A Fortress Called Home =

Studio album by Seven Spires
- Released: June 21, 2024
- Genre: Symphonic metal
- Length: 64:13
- Label: Frontiers
- Producer: Jack Kosto

Seven Spires chronology
| Gods of Debauchery (2021) | A Fortress Called Home (2024) |

Singles from A Fortress Called Home
- 1. "Almosttown" Released: March 7, 2024; 2. "Architect of Creation" Released: April 10, 2024; 3. "Portrait of Us" Released: June 21, 2024; 4. "Love's Souvenir" Released: April 21, 2025

Professional ratings
Review scores
| Source | Rating |
|---|---|
| Metal.de | 8/10 |
| Sonic Perspectives | 9.3/10 |

A Fortress Called Home is the fourth studio album by American symphonic metal band Seven Spires, released on June 21, 2024. A deluxe edition of the album was released on October 11, 2025, that includes an acoustic version of "House of Lies" as a bonus track.

== Track listing ==
1. "A Fortress Called Home" – 1:53
2. "Songs upon Wine-Stained Tongues" – 7:46
3. "Almosttown" – 5:06
4. "Impossible Tower" – 6:14
5. "Love's Souvenir" – 6:49
6. "Architect of Creation" – 5:37
7. "Portrait of Us" – 4:46
8. "Emerald Necklace" – 3:49
9. "Where Sorrows Bear My Name" – 5:44
10. "No Place for Us" – 4:56
11. "House of Lies" – 4:43
12. "The Old Hurt of Being Left Behind" – 6:50

== Personnel ==
- Adrienne Cowan – vocals, keyboards
- Jack Kosto – guitars
- Peter de Reyna – bass, additional vocals
- Chris Dovas – drums
