= Beglan =

Beglan: Scottish Gaelic: Beag-Ghleann
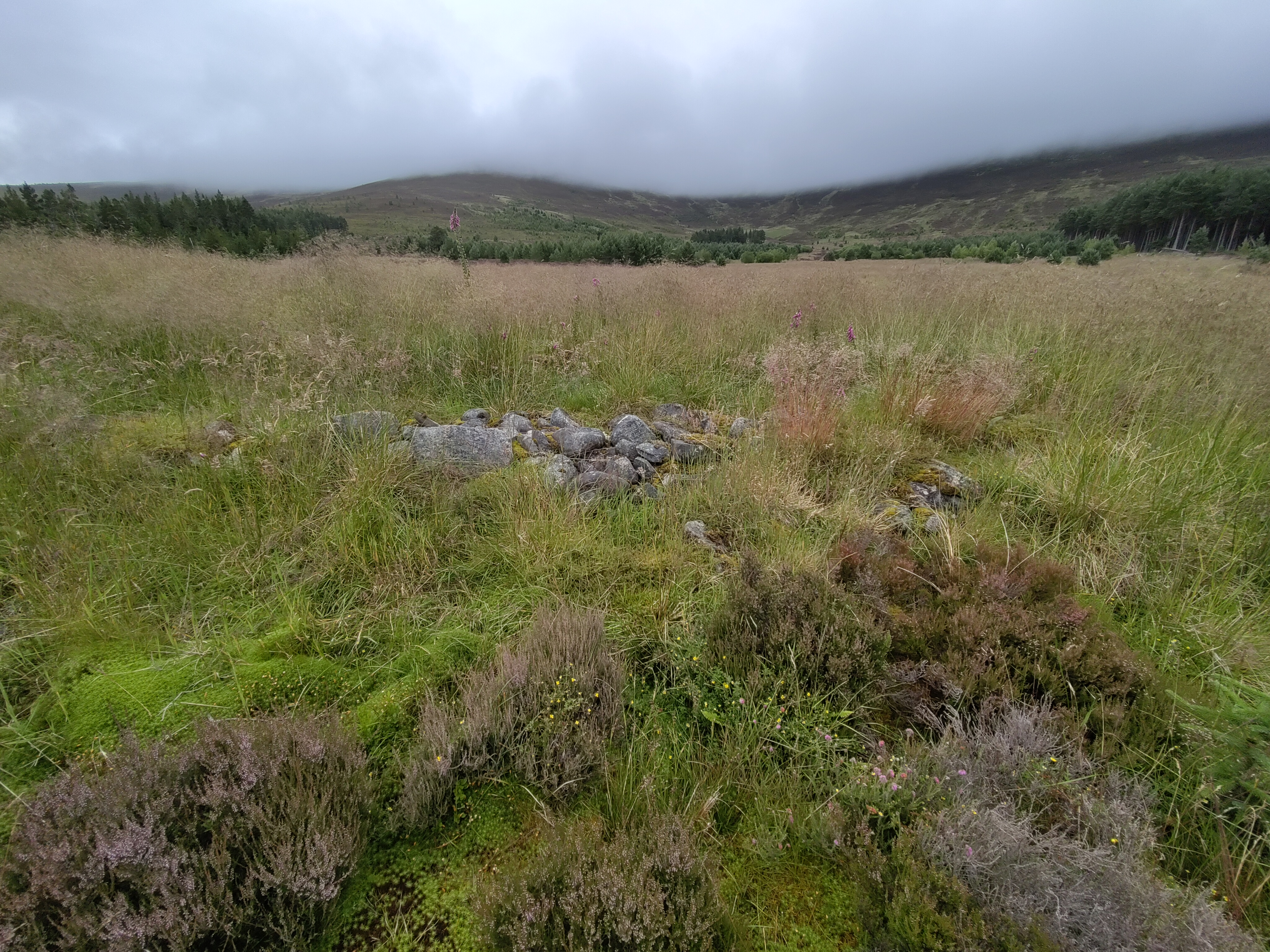
- Ruins of the abandoned Beglan township

- Location within the Highland council area
- Council area: Highland
- Country: Scotland
- Sovereign state: United Kingdom

Beglan (Scottish Gaelic: Beag-Ghleann) was a small township located in Glenmore Forest Park. The earliest cartographic evidence of Beglan dates back to 1747. The settlement was deserted by 1875.

== Township ==
At its largest, the town consisted of 12 houses. Some arable plots of land were located next to the village.

== Clearance ==
The small tenant farms of Beglan inhabitants were cleared to make place for a sheep farm, which was moved there by the landlord to create a deer forest nearby.

== Legacy ==
Only a few ruins of the township currently remain. A small path was constructed for visitors to walk past these ruins, and a small sign indicates the location of this former township.

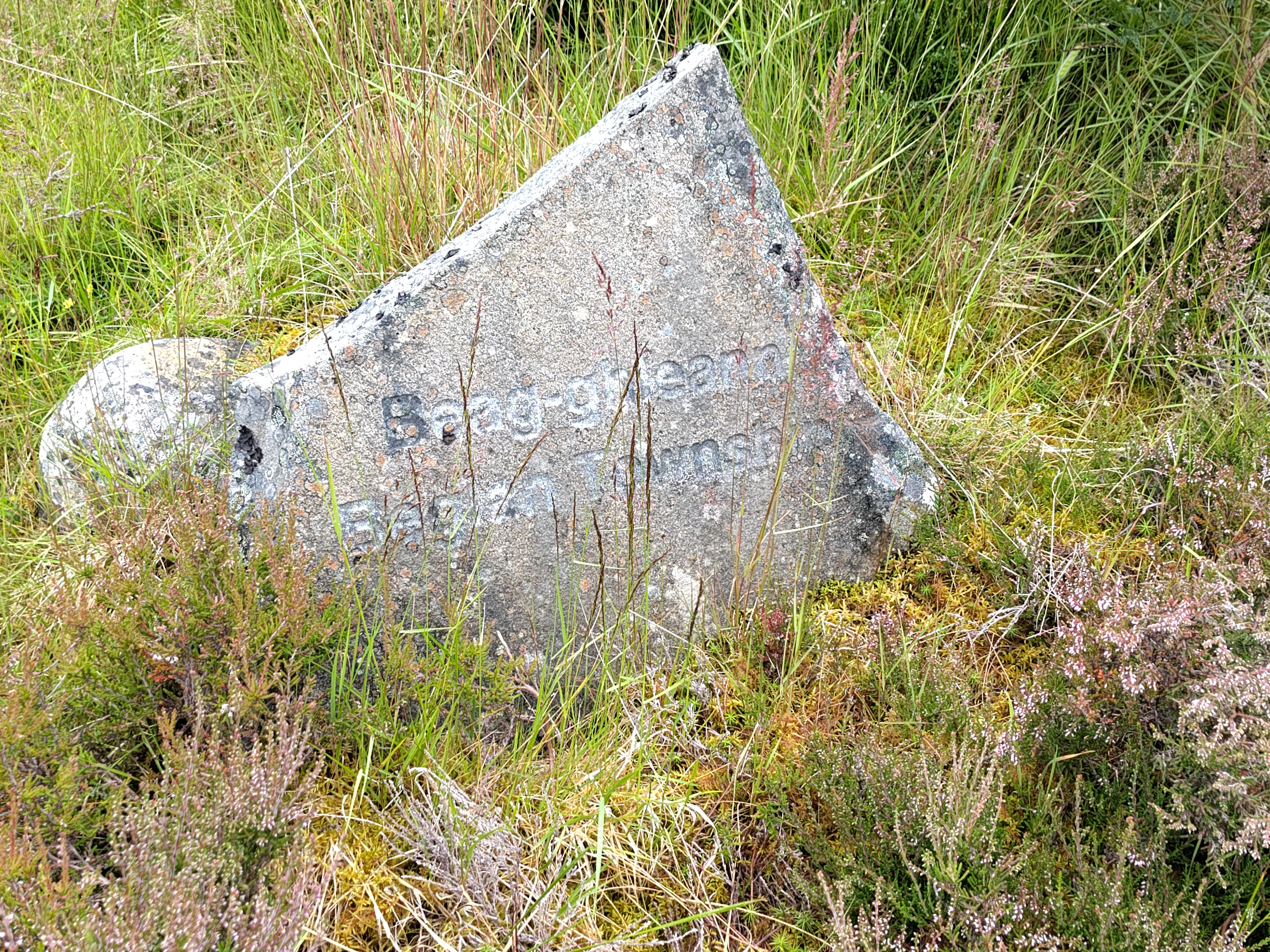
A weathered stone marking the location of the abandoned Beglan township, with the text "Beag-ghleann" and "Beglan Township"
