= An Lochan Uaine =

Loch in Scotland

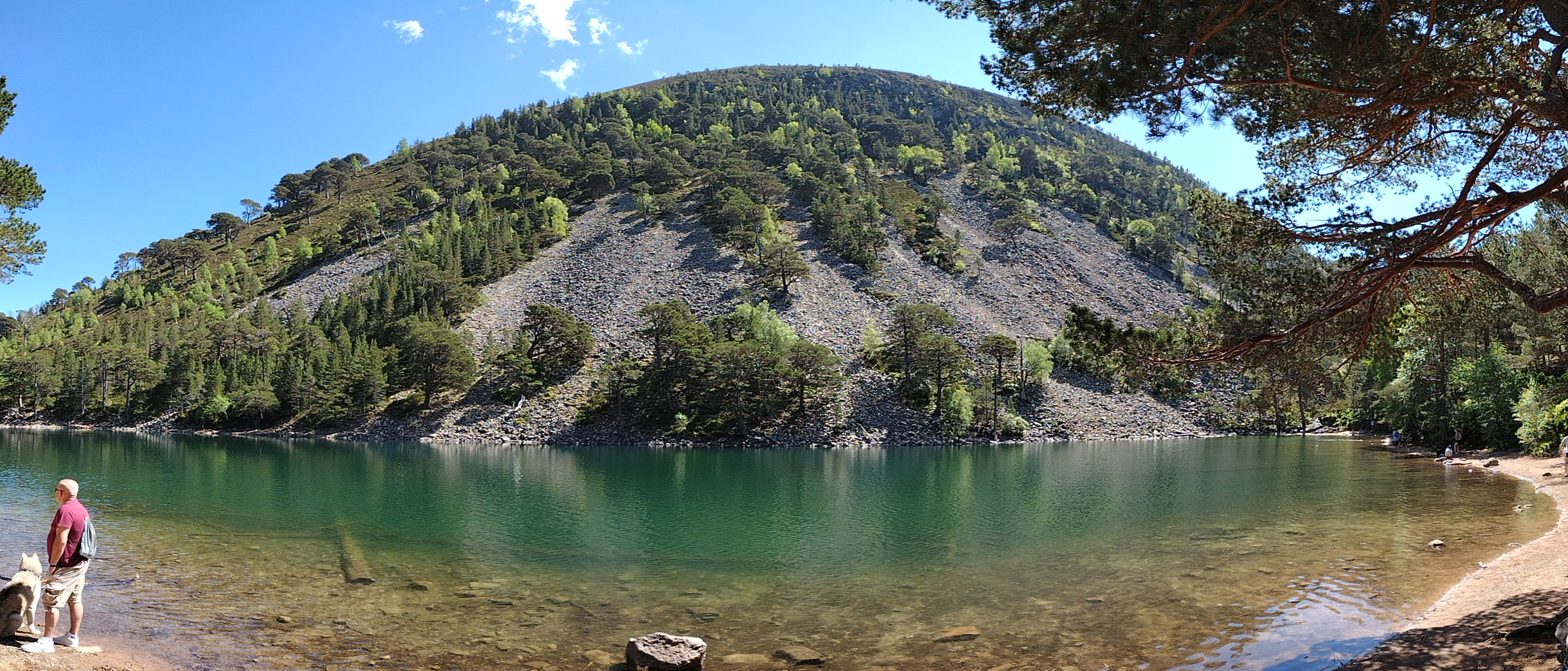
- View of the lake, with the Greag Nan Gall in the background

- Location within Highland
- Location: Badenoch and Strathspey, Highland, Scotland
- Coordinates: 57.17518°N 3.65436°W
- Type: freshwater loch
- Etymology: Scottish Gaelic: green small loch
- Basin countries: Scotland
- Max. length: 460 metres (1,510 ft)
- Surface elevation: 316 metres (1,037 ft)
- Islands: no

An Lochan Uaine is a small freshwater loch in the Highland council area of Scotland.

== Etymology ==
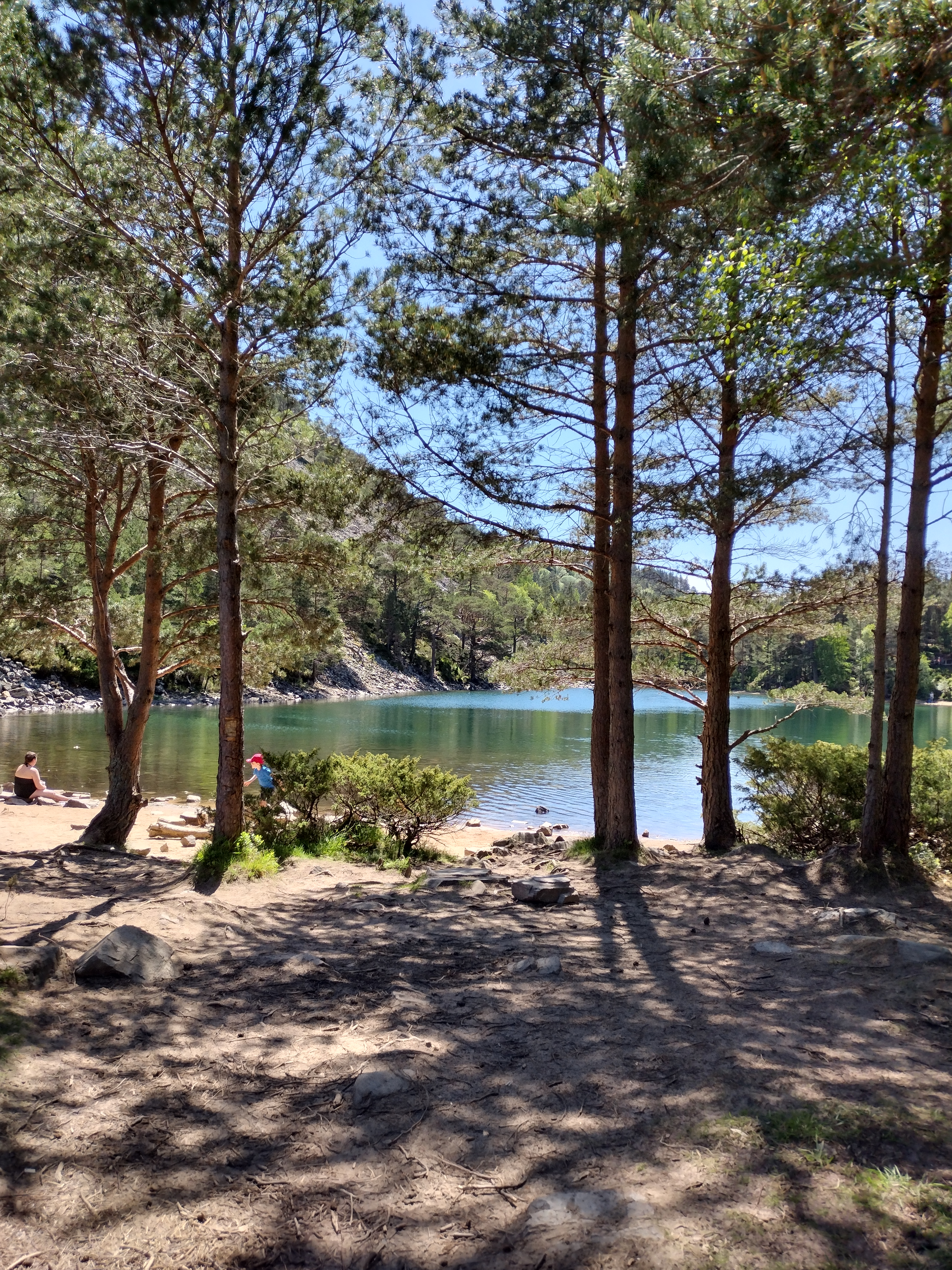
N view of the loch

Lochan Uaine can be translated from Scottish Gaelic as Green Tarn. According to local legends, the green colour of its water is caused by the fairies who wash their green clothes in the loch.

== Geography ==
The loch is located at an elevation of 316 metres (1,037 ft) about 2 miles (3.2 km) NE of Loch Morlich. Its length is 460 metres (1,510 ft). It lies at the foot of the Eastern flanks of the Greag Nan Gall (622 m). The lake is considered by geologists a good example of a morainic tarn.

== Nature conservation ==
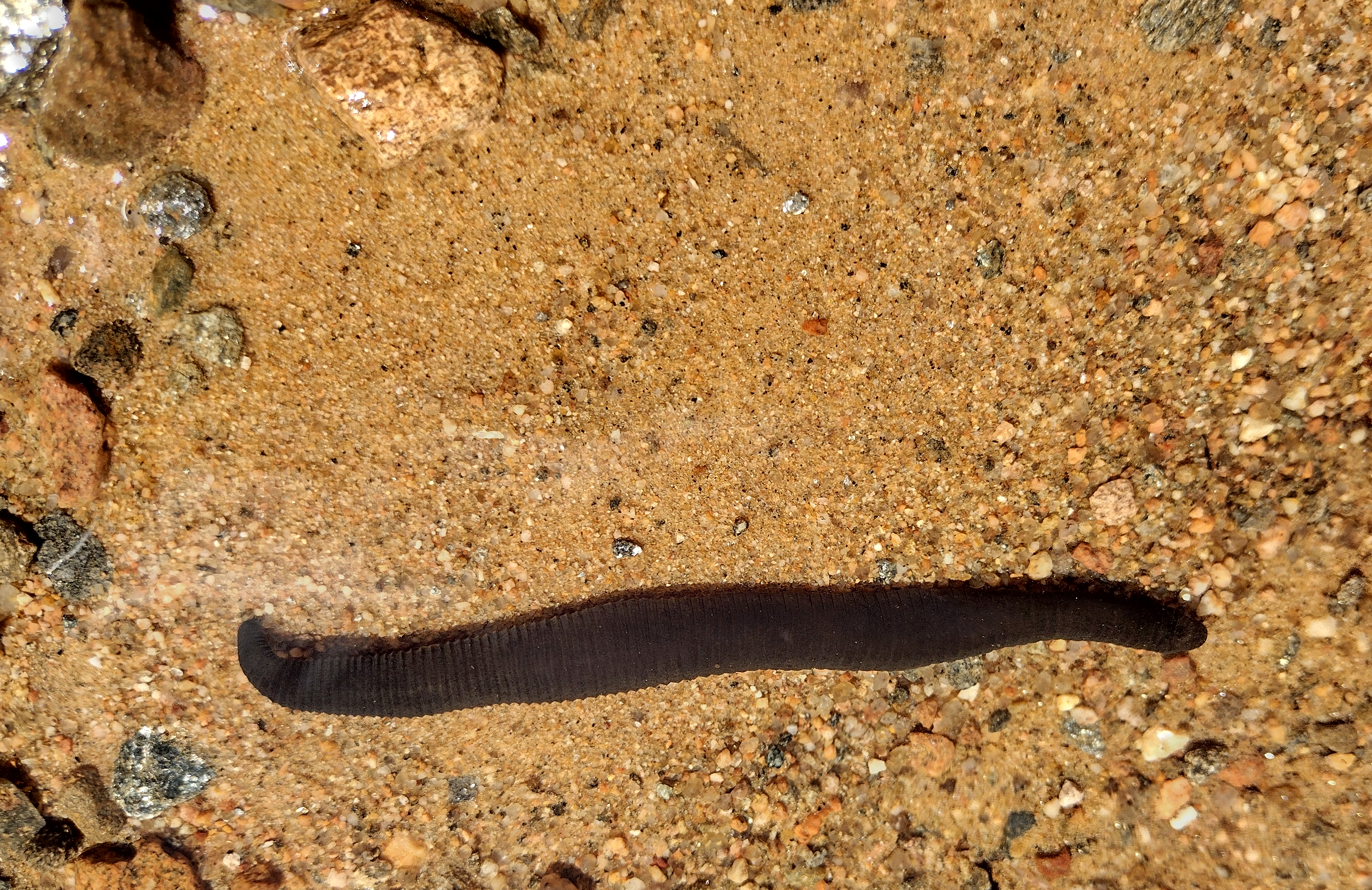
Horse leech close to the lake shore

The loch is included in the Glenmore Forest Park, not faraway from its visitor centre, and in the Cairngorms National Park.

== Hiking ==
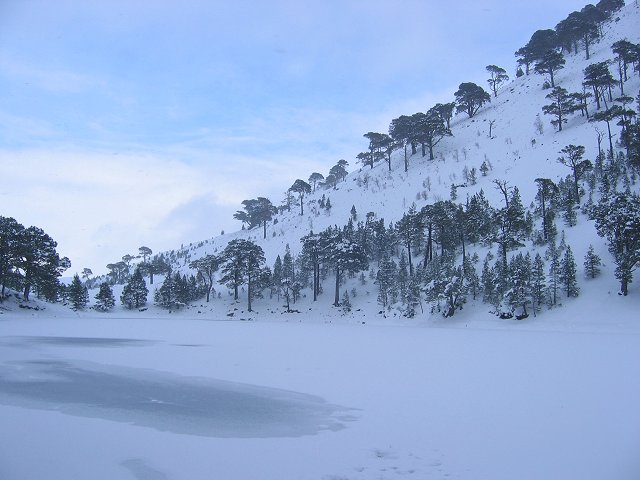
The loch in March

The loch can be reached from Loch Morlich with an easy walk, starting from the Glenmore Forest visitor centre; walking a little more is possible to touch the Ryvoan Pass too, at the end of the glen. The hike is considered very suitable also for children.
