= Solveig (album) =

Studio album by Seven Spires
- Released: August 4, 2017
- Genre: Symphonic metal
- Length: 64:07
- Label: Black Ray Music Group LLC
- Producers: Jack Kosto, Adrienne Cowan

Seven Spires chronology
Solveig (2017)	Emerald Seas (2020)

Solveig is the debut studio album by American symphonic metal band Seven Spires, released on August 4, 2017. A music video was released for the song "The Paradox". The album has received mixed to positive reviews. While the album's sound is generally symphonic metal, the songs lean into different genres like black metal ("The Paradox"), folk metal ("Serenity"), power metal ("Stay" and "Distant Lights"), rock 'n' roll, jazz, and death metal.

== Track listing ==
1. "The Siren" (intro) – 1:51
2. "Encounter" – 3:51
3. "The Siren (Reprise)" – 0:20
4. "The Cabaret of Dreams" – 4:23
5. "Choices" – 4:45
6. "Closure" – 5:39
7. "100 Days" – 3:35
8. "Stay" – 4:32
9. "The Paradox" – 5:09
10. "Serenity" – 4:36
11. "Depths" – 4:17
12. "Distant Lights" – 4:56
13. "Burn" – 8:15
14. "Ashes" – 4:48
15. "Reflections" (outro) – 3:10

== Personnel ==
- Adrienne Cowan – lead vocals, keyboards
- Jack Kosto – guitars, backing vocals
- Peter de Reyna – bass, backing vocals
- Chris Dovas – drums
