= Heide Solveig Göttner =

German fantasy writer (born 1969)

- Born: 1969 (age 56–57); Munich, West Germany
- Education: LMU Munich
- Occupation: fantasy writer

Heide Solveig Göttner (born 1969 in Munich) is a German fantasy writer.

== Life ==
Göttner grew up in Munich. She began writing at a young age. She studied English studies, American studies and political science at LMU Munich. She won a literature scholarship of Munich in 1992. She has been working as a foreign language lecturer since 1997. Her fantasy novels are based on the history and mythology of Sardinia. Göttner combined reading from her books with music.

Heide Solveig Göttner lives with her Sardinian boyfriend in Freiburg im Breisgau.

== Literature ==
Trilogy: Die Insel der Stürme

- Piper, ed. (2006), Die Priesterin der Türme, Munich, ISBN 978-3-492-75004-2
- Piper, ed. (2007), Der Herr der Dunkelheit, Munich, ISBN 978-3-492-75007-3
- Piper, ed. (2009), Die Königin der Quelle, Munich, ISBN 978-3-492-26696-3
