= Gods of Debauchery =

Studio album by Seven Spires
- Released: September 10, 2021
- Genre: Symphonic metal
- Length: 77:31
- Label: Frontiers
- Producer: Jack Kosto

Seven Spires chronology
Emerald Seas (2020)	Gods of Debauchery (2021)	A Fortress Called Home (2024)

Singles from Gods of Debauchery
- 1. "The Cursed Muse" Released: April 27, 2021; 2. "This God Is Dead" Released: June 5, 2021; 3. "Lightbringer" Released: July 27, 2021; 4. "The Unforgotten Name" Released: August 28, 2021

Professional ratings
Review scores
Source	Rating
Metal.de	8/10
Outburn	9/10

Gods of Debauchery is the third studio album by American symphonic metal band Seven Spires, released on September 10, 2021. While the album's sound is generally symphonic metal, the songs lean into different genres like extreme metal, power metal, pop, progressive, and film score. Singles were released for some songs including "Lightbringer" and "The Unforgotten Name".

== Track listing ==
1. "Wanderer’s Prayer" – 1:42
2. "Gods of Debauchery" – 6:41
3. "The Cursed Muse" – 4:23
4. "Ghost of Yesterday" – 3:53
5. "Lightbringer" – 3:03
6. "Echoes of Eternity" – 5:13
7. "Shadow on an Endless Sea" – 5:06
8. "Dare to Live" – 4:44
9. "In Sickness, in Health" – 4:21
10. "This God Is Dead" – 10:37
11. "Oceans of Time" – 4:17
12. "The Unforgotten Name" – 5:33
13. "Gods Amongst Men" – 4:10
14. "Dreamchaser" – 5:39
15. "Through Lifetimes" – 4:13
16. "Fall with Me" – 4:00

== Personnel ==
- Adrienne Cowan – lead vocals, keyboards
- Jack Kosto – guitars
- Peter de Reyna – bass, backing vocals
- Chris Dovas – drums
