= Seven Spires =

American metal band

- Origin: Boston
- Genre: Symphonic metal
- Years active: 2013–present
- Label: Frontiers Music
- Members: Jack Kosto; Adrienne Cowan; Peter de Reyna; Dylan Gowan
- Past members: Chris Dovas
- Website: sevenspiresband.com

Seven Spires is an American symphonic metal band established in 2013 in Boston. The band was founded by guitarist Jack Kosto and vocalist Adrienne Cowan, who are the main songwriters. Seven Spires debuted a year later with EP The Cabaret of Dreams. Since this debut, and with the permanent lineup additions of bassist Peter de Reyna and drummer Chris Dovas, the band has released four studio albums. The first album, Solveig, was produced independently. Afterwards, Seven Spires signed on with Frontiers Music, releasing two additional studio albums each with multiple music videos produced by EmVision Productions and released by Frontiers Music.

Seven Spires feature elements of many styles and genres of metal, including melodic death metal, black metal, and power metal. The band's music focuses around concept albums, usually taking place in the same fictional universe. In independent circles, the band's albums have received strong reviews in particular for their musicianship, technical ability, and emotional storytelling.

The band toured with DragonForce in 2022. In 2023, they toured with Twilight Force, Silver Bullet, Omnium Gatherum, and Eluveitie.

== Band members ==
Current

- Jack Kosto – guitars (2013–present)
- Adrienne Cowan – lead vocals, keyboards (2013–present)
- Peter de Reyna – bass, vocals (2013–present)
- Dylan Gowan – drums (2024–present)

Former

- Chris Dovas – drums (2015–2023)

== Discography ==
Studio albums

- Solveig (2017)
- Emerald Seas (2020)
- Gods of Debauchery (2021)
- A Fortress Called Home (2024)
