= Nethy Bridge =

Coordinates: 57.26335°N 3.65459°W

Nethy Bridge: Scottish Gaelic: Cinn Drochaid
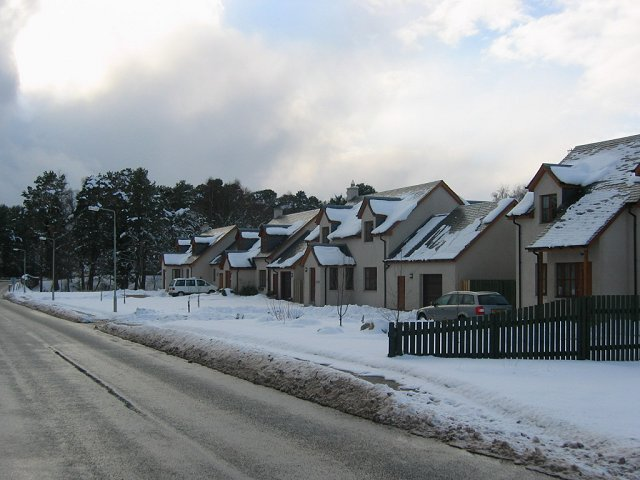

- Location within the Badenoch and Strathspey area
- Population: 680 (2020)
- Council area: Highland
- Country: Scotland
- Sovereign state: United Kingdom
- Post town: Nethy Bridge
- Postcode district: PH25
- Dialling code: 01479
- Police: Scotland
- Fire: Scottish
- Ambulance: Scottish
- UK Parliament: Moray West, Nairn and Strathspey
- Scottish Parliament: Inverness and Nairn

Nethy Bridge (Scottish Gaelic: Cinn Drochaid or Drochaid Neithich) is a small village in Strathspey in the Highland council area of Scotland. The village lies 5 miles (8 km) south of Grantown-on-Spey within the historical parish of Abernethy and Kincardine, and the Cairngorms National Park.

== History ==
Often affectionately referred to simply as "Nethy" the village has, since Victorian times been a tourist destination noted for its quiet and secluded location at the edge of the Abernethy Forest. It is in the heart of Strathspey in the Highlands of Scotland, between Aviemore and Grantown, and is within the boundary of the Cairngorms National Park which was established in 2003.

A primary industry of Nethy Bridge was forestry, with at one time several sawmills in the area, but this has long since subsided and now much of the income is derived from tourism.

The name is derived from the River Nethy, a tributary of the nearby Spey, which runs through the village, and the arched bridge which was built in 1810, to a classic Telford design, and is in the heart of the village. It had to be repaired after the Moray flood of August 1829, when part of it was washed away. In total, there are four Telford bridges in Nethy.

Originally called Abernethy (Scottish Gaelic: Obar Neithich), Nethy Bridge was renamed shortly after the railways came this far north in the 1860s. There was already a station called Abernethy on the North British Railway line from Ladybank to Perth further south, so perhaps the Great North of Scotland Railway renamed this one Nethy Bridge to differentiate the two. The placename Abernethy is still frequently used around here: Abernethy Highland Games, Abernethy Forest, Abernethy Primary School etc.

The Aultmore Estate on the northern edge of Nethy Bridge has an Edwardian mansion and estate cottages, let out for tourism. The landed estate is owned by Bob Dylan, who put it on the market in 2023 for £3 million.

Nethy Bridge was evacuated on 24 July 2026 due to the proximity of the 2026 Cairngorms wildfire. The evacuation order ended on the following day. That year's Abernethy Highland Games event, planned to be held in August, was subsequently called off due to the fire.

== Community and tourism ==
In 2011 the population of Nethy Bridge was 640.

Nethy Bridge was one of the first communities in the area to establish a tourist association website. A major part of the website is to record all properties with their individual history, and several village "elders" have been enlisted to research and record the facts.

In 2019, BBC Winterwatch was broadcast from the village.
