= Cairngorms National Park =

National park in Scotland

- IUCN category V (protected landscape/seascape)
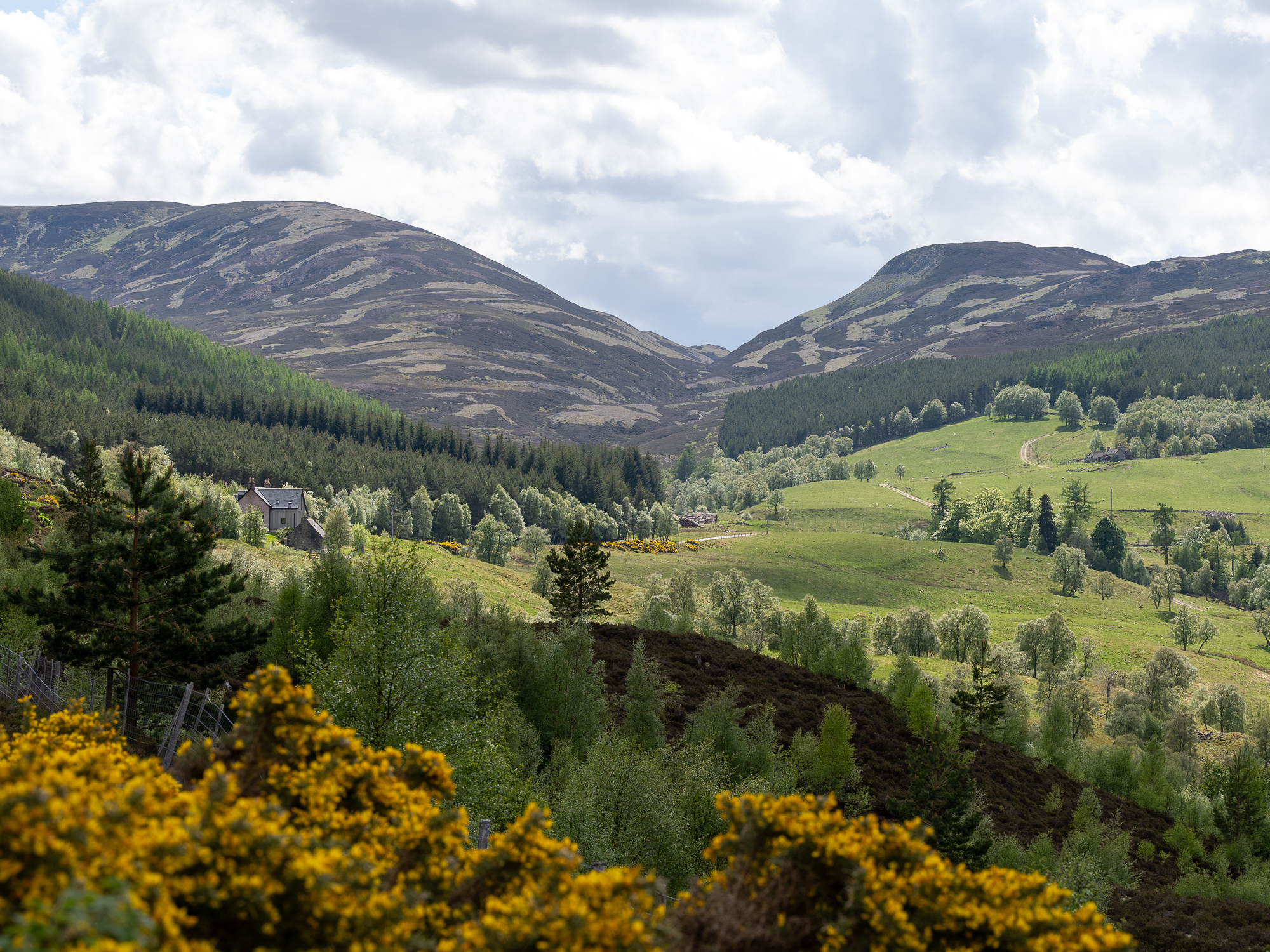
- View of the Cairngorms National Park.

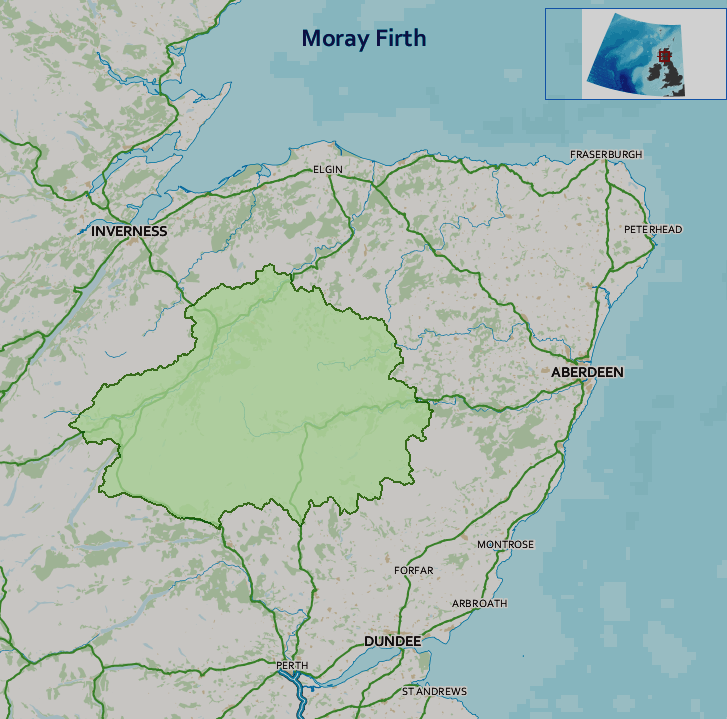
- Location and extent of the Cairngorms National Park
- Location: Cairngorms, Scotland
- Coordinates: 57°5′N 3°40′W
- Area: 4,528 km^{2} (1,748 sq mi)
- Established: 2003
- Governing body: National park authority
- Website: cairngorms.co.uk

Ramsar Wetland
- Official name: Cairngorm Lochs
- Designated: 24 July 1981
- Reference no.: 216

Cairngorms National Park (Scottish Gaelic: Pàirc Nàiseanta a' Mhonaidh Ruaidh) is a national park in northeast Scotland, established in 2003. It was the second of two national parks established by the Scottish Parliament, after Loch Lomond and The Trossachs National Park, which was set up in 2002. The park covers the Cairngorms range of mountains, and surrounding hills. Already the largest national park in the United Kingdom, in 2010 it was expanded into Perth and Kinross.

Roughly 18,000 people live within the 4,528-square-kilometre (1,748 sq mi) national park. The largest communities are Aviemore, Ballater, Braemar, Grantown-on-Spey, Kingussie, Newtonmore and Tomintoul. Like all other national parks in the UK, the park is IUCN designated Category V. However, it contains within its boundaries several national nature reserves that have IUCN Category II (national park) statuses, such as Abernethy Forest and Mar Lodge Estate.

In 2018, 1.9 million tourism visits were recorded. The majority of visitors are domestic, with 25 per cent coming from elsewhere in the UK, and 21 per cent being from other countries. Tourism makes up about 80% of the economy of the national park.

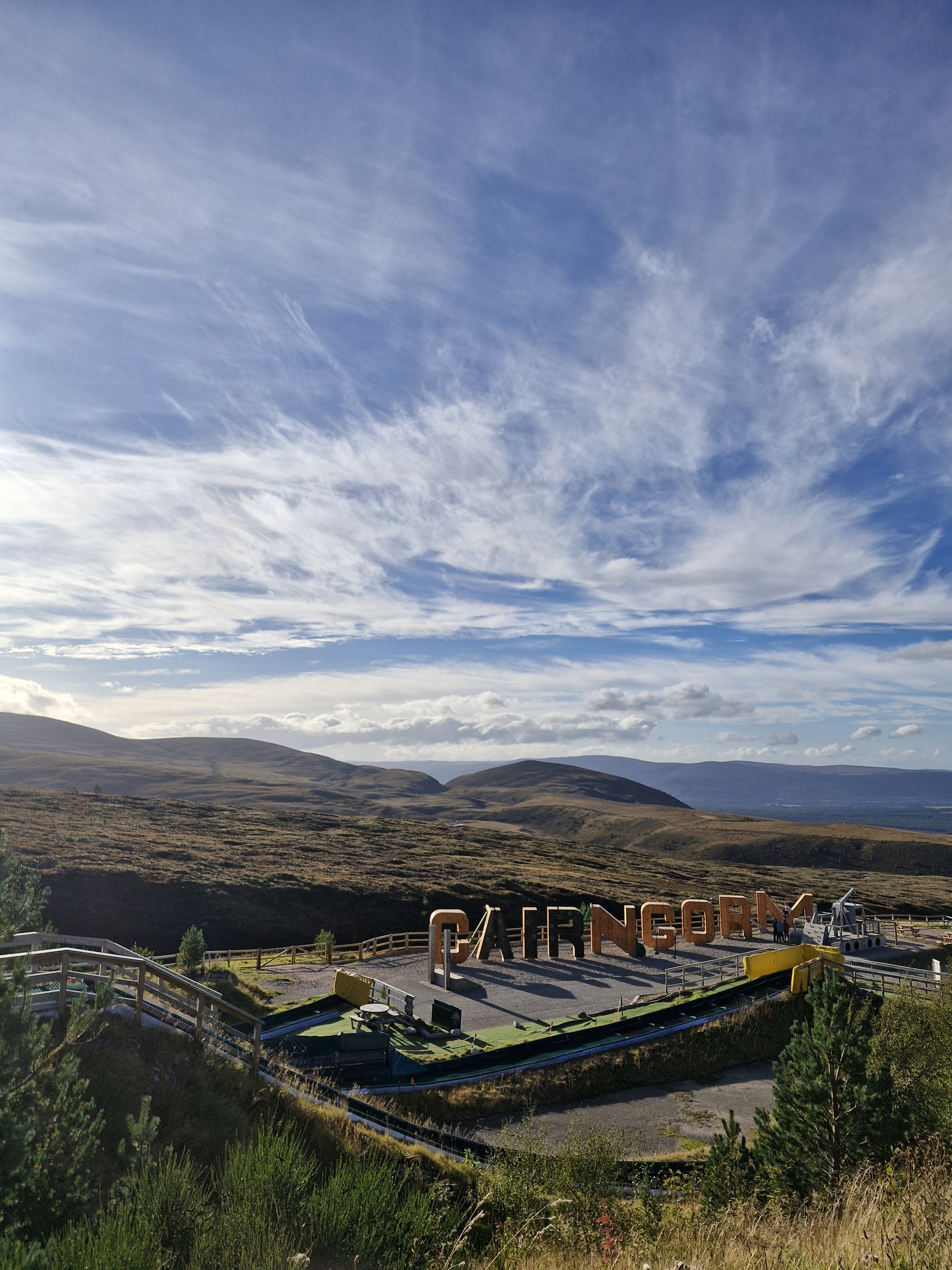
Sign at Cairngorm Mountain Railway base

== Geography ==
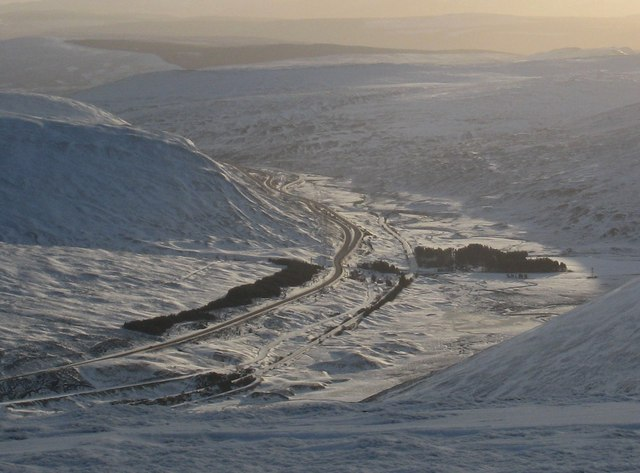
The Pass of Drumochter is the main route into the national park from the south.

The Cairngorms National Park covers an area of 4,528 km^{2} (1,748 sq mi) in the council areas of Aberdeenshire, Moray, Highland, Angus and Perth and Kinross. The mountain range of the Cairngorms lies at the heart of the national park, but forms only one part of it, alongside other hill ranges such as the Angus Glens and the Monadhliath, and lower areas like Strathspey and upper Deeside. Three major rivers rise in the park: the Spey, the Dee, and the Don. The Spey, which is the second longest river in Scotland, rises in the Monadhliath, whilst the Dee and the Don both rise in the Cairngorms themselves.

The Cairngorms themselves are a spectacular landscape, similar in appearance to the Hardangervidda National Park of Norway in having a large area of upland plateau. The range consists of three main plateaux at about 1000–1200 m above sea level, above which domed summits (the eroded stumps of once much higher mountains) rise to around 1300 m. Many of the summits have tors, free-standing rock outcrops that stand on top of the boulder-strewn landscape. The edges of the plateaux are in places steep cliffs of granite and they are excellent for skiing, rock climbing and ice climbing. The Cairngorms form an arctic-alpine mountain environment, with tundra-like characteristics and long-lasting snow patches.

The Monadhliath mountains lie to the north of Strathspey, and comprise a bleak, wide plateau rising to between 700 and 950 m.

Two major transport routes run through the park, with both the A9 road and the Highland Main Line crossing over the Pass of Drumochter and running along Strathspey, providing links between the western and northern parts of the park and the cities of Perth and Inverness. The Highland Main Line is the only mainline rail route through the park, however there are several other major roads, including the A86, which links Strathspey to Fort William, and the A93, which links the Deeside area of the park to both Perth and Aberdeen.

== Geology ==
The majority of the rocks within the Cairngorms National Park belong to the Dalradian Supergroup, a thick sequence of sands, muds and limestones that were deposited between about 800 and 600 million years ago on the margins of the former continent of Laurentia. Rocks now ascribed to the Moine Supergroup occur along the northwestern edge of the Park. These Dalradian and Moine successions were intensely faulted, folded and metamorphosed during the Caledonian Orogeny between about 490 and 430 million years ago. Geologists recognize a 'Grampian event', centred around 470 million years ago, which was responsible for the initial deformation of the Dalradian and relates to the collision of a volcanic island arc with Laurentia over a period of about 20 million years. The subsequent collision of Baltica with Laurentia caused the 'Scandian event' which involved further folding and faulting of the Dalradian rock sequence. The Great Glen, Ericht-Laidon and Glen Tilt faults were all active as strike-slip faults at this time and may have played a part in allowing large plutons of granite to rise up amongst the Dalradian rocks and then cool in situ.

The largest of these plutons is the granite mass which forms the Cairngorms themselves and which was emplaced around 427 million years ago. It is thought that the pluton had been unroofed within 20 million years of its emplacement and that the present landscape of the Cairngorms had begun to form by 390 million years ago. Evidence suggests that the granite currently at the surface was initially to be found at a depth of between 4 and 7 km.

Other than a small outlier of Old Red Sandstone, there are no younger solid rocks within the national park. The ice ages of the last 2.5 million years have however left their mark both in terms of erosional and depositional features. Post-glacial features include peat and landslips.

== Nature and conservation ==
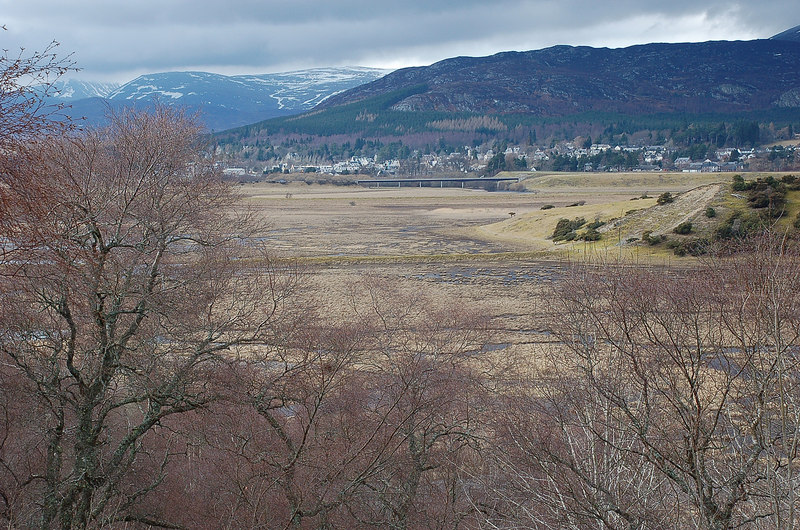
Insh Marshes are an important area of wetlands within the national park.

The Cairngorm mountains provide a unique alpine semi-tundra moorland habitat, home to many rare plants, birds and animals. Speciality bird species on the plateaux include breeding rock ptarmigan, Eurasian dotterel, snow bunting, golden eagle, ring ouzel, and red grouse. Mammal species include red deer and mountain hare, as well as the only herd of semi-domesticated reindeer in the British Isles. They now roam the high Cairngorms, after being brought in 1952 by a Swedish herdsman. The herd is now stable at around 150 individuals, some born in Scotland and some introduced from Sweden.

The straths and glens of the national park feature a type of ancient woodland known as the Caledonian Forest. The expanse of pinewood that stretches from Glen Feshie to Abernethy forms the largest single area of this habitat remaining in Scotland, and the park as a whole holds more than half the surviving Caledonian forest. In these forests can be found bird species such western capercaillie, black grouse, Scottish crossbill, parrot crossbill and crested tit.

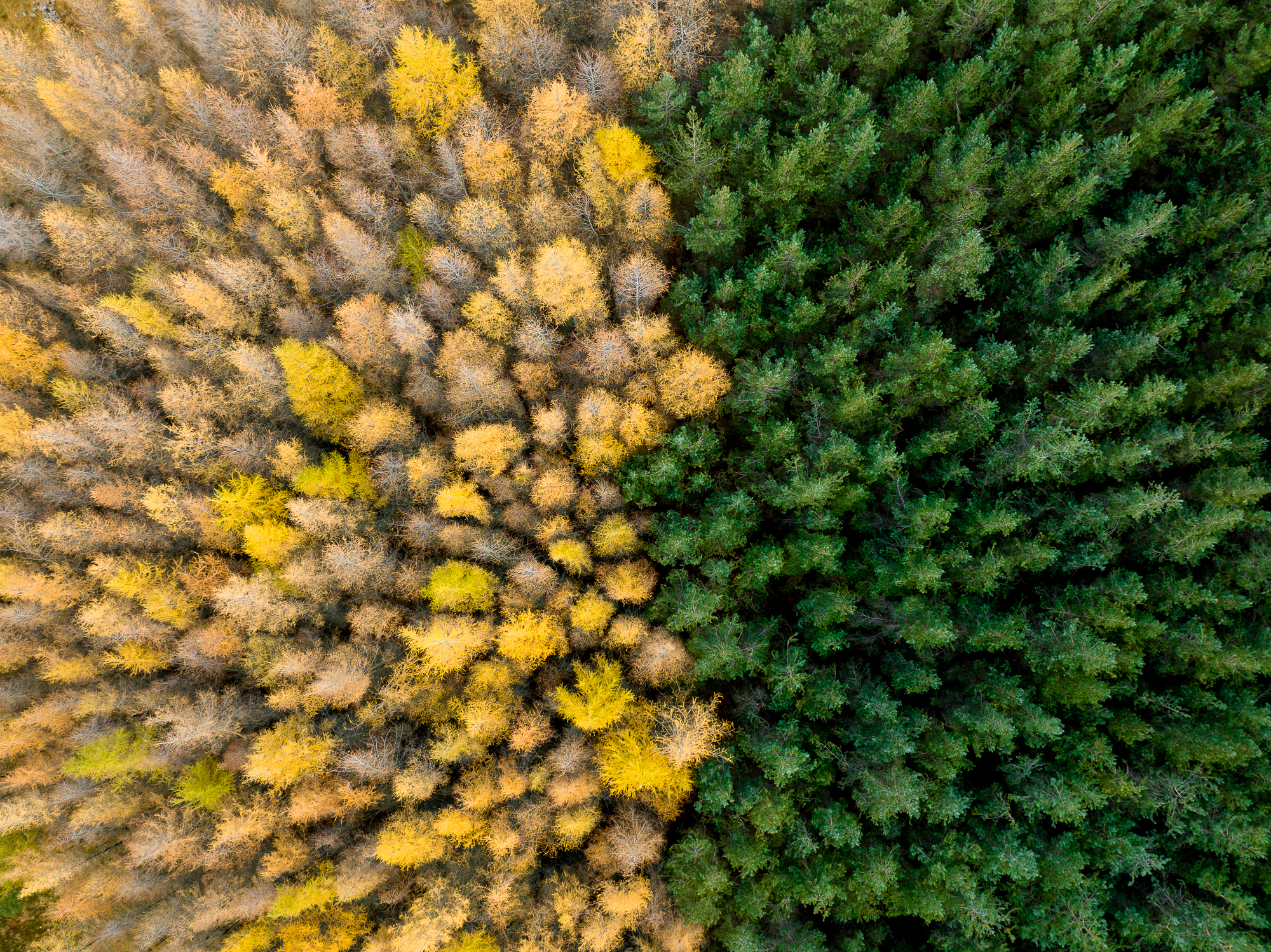
The forests near the River Muick in the Cairngorms National Park are of special natural importance.

The entire length of the River Dee is defined as a Special Area of Conservation (SAC) due to its importance for Atlantic salmon, Eurasian otters and freshwater pearl mussels, and the Don supports fish such as salmon, sea trout, brown trout, eels and lamprey. In upper Strathspey, the Insh Marshes form one of the largest areas of floodplain mire and fen vegetation in Scotland, and are important for many species of birds that breed there each summer. Breeding species include osprey, ducks such as Eurasian wigeon, northern shoveler and goldeneye, and waders including redshank, snipe, Eurasian curlew and northern lapwing. The marshes also receive winter visitors including greylag geese from Iceland and up to 200 whooper swans.

The national park is classified as a Category V protected area by the International Union for Conservation of Nature, meaning that it is an area in which people have interacted with the landscape for many years, and which is managed to sustain the habitats and landscape that have resulted from this interaction. The IUCN defines "National Parks" as areas conforming with Category II of its classification system (q.v. the Hardangervidda National Park). However, Scotland in general lacks such areas, as thousands of years of human activity, including agriculture, historical deforestation, overgrazing by sheep and deer, and extensive 20th century afforestation with introduced tree species (particularly conifers), have resulted in landscapes which are best described as semi-natural.

Within the national park there are many areas that have additional protection via other conservation designations: there are 19 Special Areas of Conservation, Special Protection Areas and 46 Sites of Special Scientific Interest. Nine of Scotland's national nature reserves are located within the park: Abernethy, Corrie Fee, Craigellachie, Glen Tanar, Insh Marshes, Muir of Dinnet, Invereshie and Inshriach, Glenmore, and Mar Lodge Estate.

== History of the national park ==
Extent of the National Park prior to the 2010 extension

The idea that parts of Scotland of wild or remote character should be designated to protect the environment and encourage public access grew in popularity throughout the nineteenth and early twentieth centuries. In 1931 a commission headed by Christopher Addison proposed the creation of a national park in the Cairngorms, alongside proposals for parks in England and Wales. Following the Second World War ten national parks were established in England and Wales, and a committee was established to consider the issue of national parks in Scotland. The report, published in 1945, proposed national parks in five areas, one of which was the Cairngorms. The government designated these five areas as "National Park Direction Areas", giving powers for planning decisions taken by local authorities to be reviewed by central government, however the areas were not given full national park status. In 1981 the direction areas were replaced by national scenic areas, of which there are now 40. In 1990 the Countryside Commission for Scotland (CCS) produced a report into protection of the landscape of Scotland, which recommended that four areas were under such pressure that they ought to be designated as national parks, each with an independent planning board, in order to retain their heritage value. The four areas identified were similar to those proposed in 1945, and thus again included the Cairngorms.

In 1993, the Cairngorms Working Party produced a report Common Sense and Sustainability: A Partnership for the Cairngorms and the Scottish Office subsequently made provision for additional grant funding from Scottish Natural Heritage to support partnership working on a voluntary basis, but no action was taken to establish national parks in Scotland until the establishment of the Scottish Parliament in 1999. The two current parks were designated as such under the National Parks (Scotland) Act 2000, which was one of the first pieces of legislation to be passed by the Parliament. Before the national park was established in 2003, Scottish Natural Heritage conducted a consultation exercise, considering the boundary and the powers and structure of the new park authority.

Following the establishment of the park many groups and local communities felt that a large area of highland Perth and Kinross should form part of the park and carried out a sustained campaign. On 13 March 2008 Michael Russell announced that the national park would be extended to take in Blair Atholl and Spittal of Glenshee, and the park was duly extended on 4 October 2010.

In 2015, 53 km (33 mi) of the 132 kV power line in the middle of the park was taken down, while another section along the edge of the park was upgraded to 400 kV.

In 2026, the national park was subject to a major wildfire in the Glenmore and Abernethy area, which led to approximately 25 square kilometres (9.7 sq mi) of landscapes being damaged.

== Sights and attractions ==
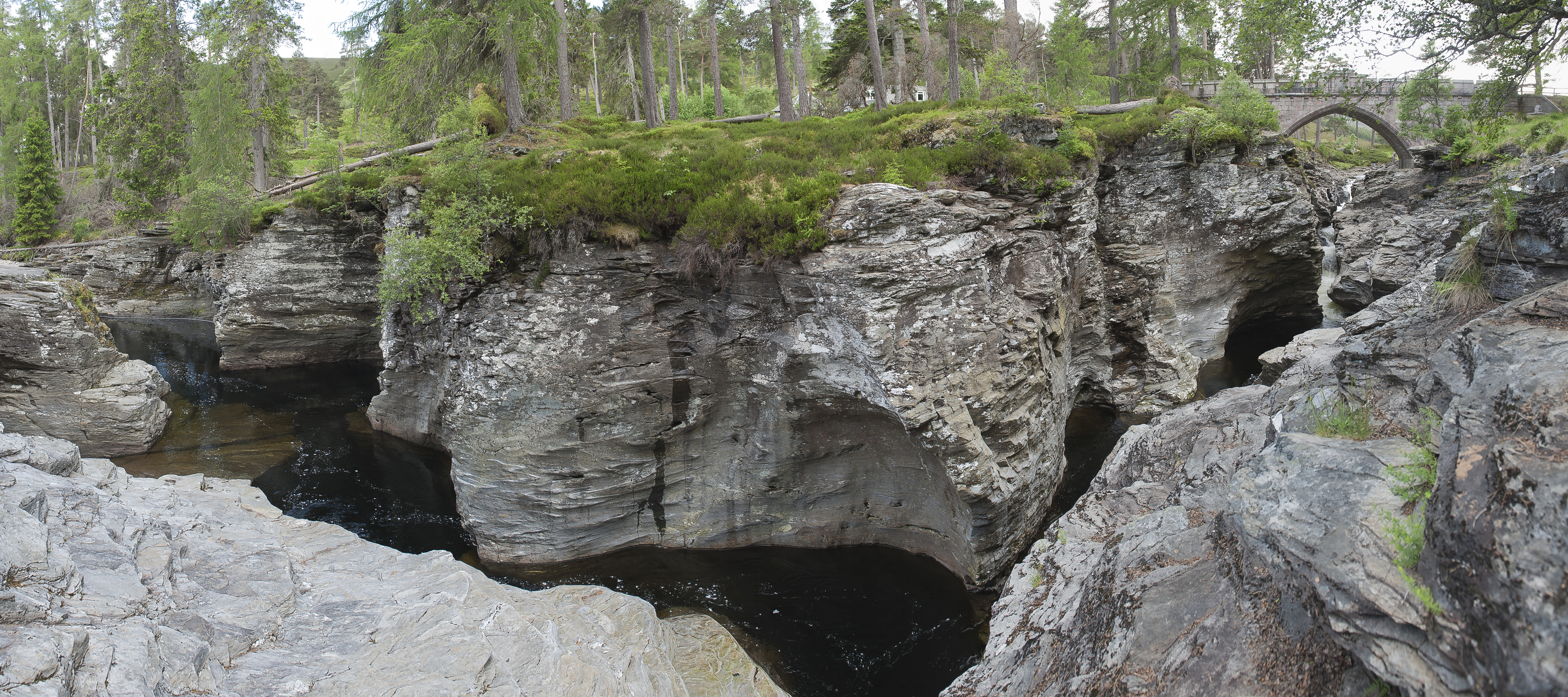
The Linn of Dee on the River Dee near Braemar. Linn is the Scots word for waterfall.

Tourism accounts for much of the economy and 43% of employment within the park area. In 2018, 1.9 million tourism visits were recorded. The park's mandate is sustainable tourism "that builds on, conserves and enhances [its] special qualities". The Cairngorms Business Partnership includes 350 private sector member businesses. In early 2017, the park was voted by Hundredrooms as one of the top seven eco-tourism destinations in Europe and discussed as a "mecca for outdoor enthusiasts". The Visit Scotland web site discusses the amenities and indicates that this park "has more mountains, forest paths, rivers, lochs, wildlife hotspots, friendly villages and distilleries than you can possibly imagine".

The village of Carrbridge is within the park. In 1717 the Carrbridge Packhorse Bridge was built to cross the River Dulnain so funeral processions could cross to the Duthil Church. It is a stone bridge and it has become a popular tourist attraction.

The park is popular for activities such as walking, cycling, mountain biking, climbing and canoeing: for hillwalkers there are 55 Munros (mountains above 3,000 feet (910 m) in height) in the park. Two of Scotland's Great Trails pass through the park: the Speyside Way and the Cateran Trail.

A skiing and winter sports industry is concentrated in the Cairngoms, with three of Scotland's five resorts situated here. They are the Cairn Gorm Ski Centre, Glenshee Ski Centre and The Lecht Ski Centre. There was controversy surrounding the construction of the Cairngorm Mountain Railway at the Cairn Gorm Ski Centre, a scheme supported by the national park authority. Supporters of the scheme claimed that it would bring in valuable tourist income, whilst opponents argued that such a development was unsuitable for a protected area. To reduce erosion, the railway operates a "closed scheme" and only allows skiers (in season) out of the upper Ptarmigan station: other visitors may not access the mountain from the railway unless on a guided walk.

The Cairngorm Mountain Railway funicular was closed in October 2018 "due to health and safety concerns", or "structural problems" according to reports in summer 2019. At the time, an investigation was still underway to determine whether modifications would be "achievable and affordable". (The same situation was reported in December 2019.) This railway first opened in 2001 and connects the base station with a restaurant on Cairn Gorm mountain.

Aviemore is a busy and popular holiday destination, located close to Glenmore Forest Park and the Cairn Gorm Ski Centre. The Strathspey Railway is preserved railway running steam and heritage diesel services between Aviemore railway station and Broomhill via Boat of Garten, along part of the former Highland Railway.

The Highland Wildlife Park also lies within the national park, and the Frank Bruce Sculpture Trail is located near Feshiebridge. This short trail through the woods features a sculptures created by Frank Bruce between 1965 and 2009.

In addition to the Cairngorm Brewery, six distilleries are located within the Park area: Dalwhinnie distillery, The Glenlivet distillery, Tomintoul distillery, Royal Lochnagar distillery, Balmenach distillery and The Speyside distillery. Royal Lochnagar, Dalwhinnie, Cairngorm Brewery and Glenlivet are set up to receive visitors on a regular basis. Tomintoul, Balmenach and Speyside can be visited but require an appointment made in advance.

== Administration ==
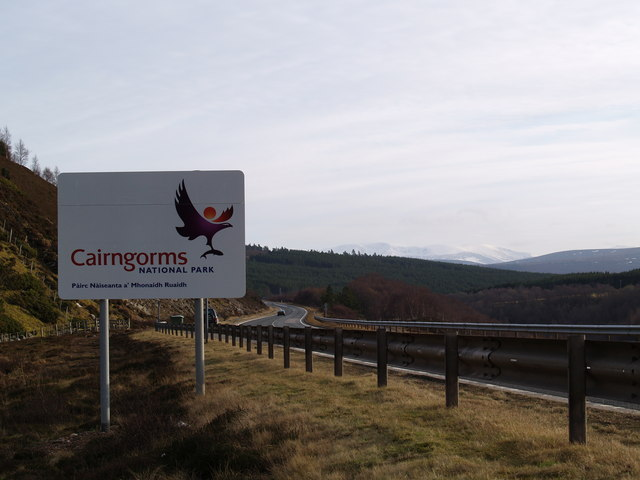
Entrance sign on the A9 road near the Slochd, showing the national park logo.

The National Park is administered by a national park authority, which is an executive non-departmental public body of the Scottish Government. Under the National Parks (Scotland) Act 2000, national parks in Scotland have four aims:

1. To conserve and enhance the natural and cultural heritage of the area
2. To promote sustainable use of the natural resources of the area
3. To promote understanding and enjoyment (including enjoyment in the form of recreation) of the special qualities of the area by the public
4. To promote sustainable economic and social development of the area's communities

The first two of this aims are identical to those included in the National Parks and Access to the Countryside Act 1949 legislation that governs national parks in England and Wales, however the Scottish national parks have two additional aims (3 and 4 above). The general purpose of the National Park Authority, as defined in the National Parks (Scotland) Act 2000, is to ensure that these aims are "collectively achieved ...in a coordinated way". Although the four aims have equal status, in accordance with the Sandford Principle, the first aim (conservation and enhancement of the natural and cultural heritage) is to be given greater weight when it appears to the park authority that there is irreconcilable conflict with the other aims.

The National Park Authority works with partners, defined as "business, land owners, communities and charities". The Cairngorms National Park Partnership Plan 2017 - 2022 includes three long-term goals: conservation, visitor experience and rural development.

The Cairngorms National Park Authority shares statutory planning functions with the five local authorities covering the area, and has the power to "call in" planning decisions made by them. The Authority also takes responsibility for managing access to the countryside that elsewhere falls to local authorities. Aside from the planning and access functions, the National Park Authority has considerable flexibility as to how the four aims are achieved. It can, for example, acquire land, make byelaws and management agreements, provide grants, offer advice, and undertake or commission research. The authority is headquartered in Grantown on Spey.

The National Park Authority is run by a board, consisting of 19 members. Five members are elected by the community and seven are appointed by the Scottish Government. The remaining seven members are nominated by the local authorities, with Highland and Aberdeenshire councils each appointing two members and the remaining three councils appointing one member each.

== Filming in the park ==
Some scenes for Monarch of the Glen (that aired from 2000 to 2005) were filmed in the park and nearby on Loch Laggan and Ardverikie House.

In 2012, some scenes for the Batman movie The Dark Knight Rises were filmed at Cairngorm Gliding Club's site at Feshiebridge. Parachutists jumped from a jet and landed at the club's airstrip.

During summer 2019, filming of No Time to Die was taking place in the town of Aviemore and in the surrounding park area. Some scenes were also being shot at the Ardverikie House Estate just outside the park.

Other films and television programmes that have done some shooting in the Park area included Mary Queen of Scots (2018), Outlaw King (Netflix, 2018), Outlander (TV series), Victoria (TV series, Episode 7), Mrs Brown (1997), Centurion, Salmon Fishing in the Yemen, The Queen (2006), The Crown (Netflix series) and Victoria & Abdul (2017).

== Settlements within the national park ==
Around 18,000 people live within the national park.

Council area	Towns and villages
Aberdeenshire (Marr committee area)	Ballater, Braemar, Corgarff, Crathie, Dinnet, Strathdon, Lumsden
Angus	Clova
Highland (Badenoch and Strathspey committee area)	Aviemore, Boat of Garten, Carrbridge, Dalwhinnie, Dulnain Bridge (Moray and Highland are separated by the bridge), Drumochter, Grantown-on-Spey, Kingussie, Laggan, Nethy Bridge, Newtonmore
Moray	Glenlivet, Tomintoul
Perth and Kinross	Blair Atholl, Killiecrankie, Spittal of Glenshee

== See also ==
- Cairngorm Club
- Geology of the Cairngorms National Park
- Scottish Highlands
- SEARS (Scotland's Environmental and Rural Services)
- Tourism in Scotland
- 2026 Cairngorms wildfire
