= Solveig Vik =

Norwegian politician (born 2003)

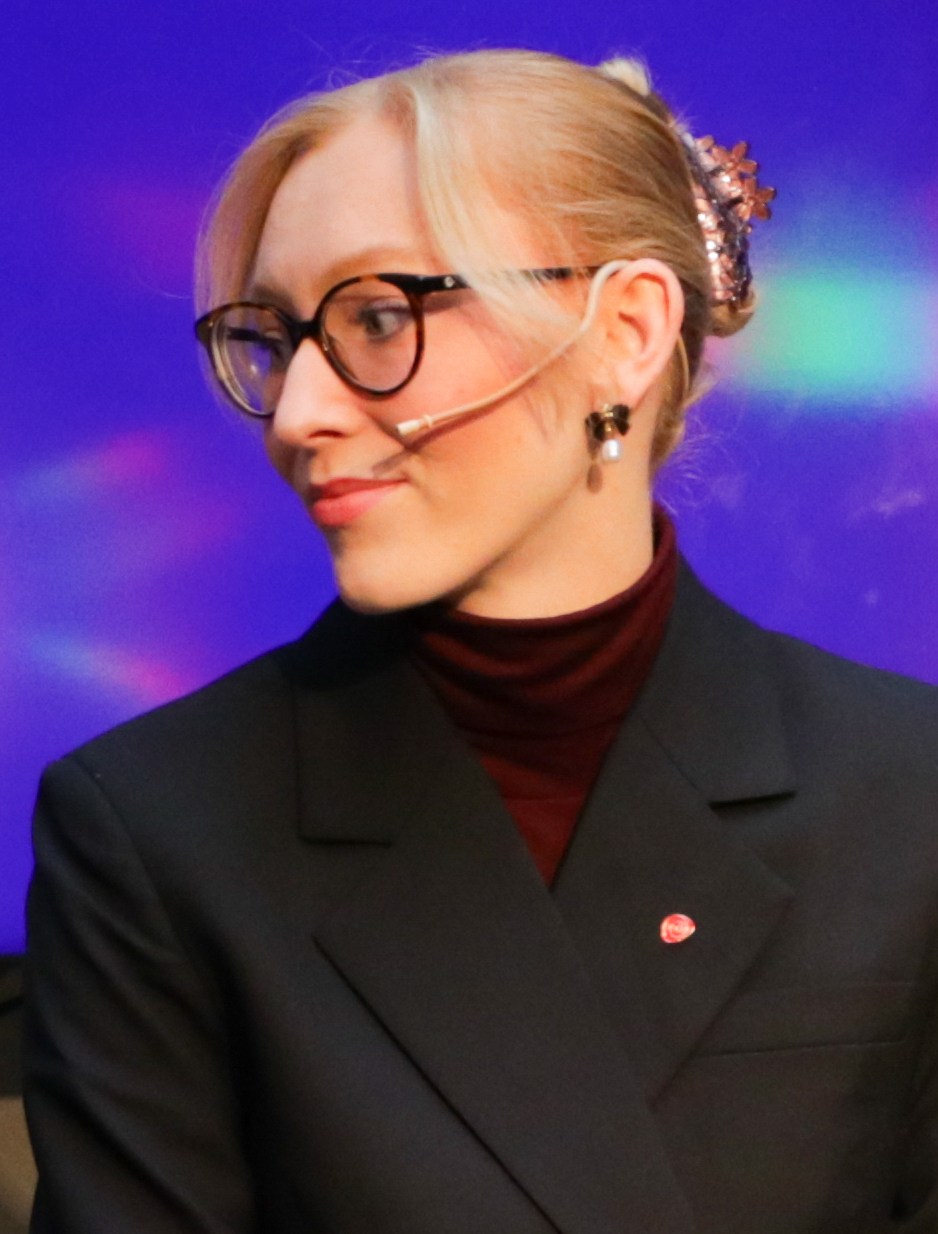
- Vik in October 2025

Deputy Member of the Storting
- Incumbent
- Assumed office 1 October 2025
- Deputising for: Andreas Bjelland Eriksen (2025–2026)
- Constituency: Rogaland

Personal details
- Born: 22 July 2003 (age 23)
- Party: Labour Party
- Education: Western Norway University of Applied Sciences

Solveig Gundersen Vik (born 22 July 2003) is a Norwegian politician and deputy member of the Storting.

Vik was born on 22 July 2003 and is from Haugesund. She was raised in the Kvala neighbourhood of Haugesund and attended Gard, Hauge and Vardafjell upper secondary schools. She is studying economics and administration at the Western Norway University of Applied Sciences in Bergen.

Vik is a member of the municipal council in Haugesund and Rogaland County Council. She was the Labour Party's fifth placed candidate in Rogaland at the 2025 parliamentary election but the party won only four seats in the constituency. She became the party's first deputy representative (Vararepresentant) in the constituency. She was a permanent substitute to the Storting for Andreas Bjelland Eriksen from 1 October 2025 until 11 September 2026 while he served as Minister of Climate and the Environment.
