= Emerald Seas =

Studio album by Seven Spires
- Released: February 14, 2020
- Genre: Symphonic metal
- Length: 49:02
- Label: Frontiers
- Producer: Jack Kosto

Seven Spires chronology
Solveig (2017)	Emerald Seas (2020)	Gods of Debauchery (2021)

Professional ratings
Review scores
Source	Rating
Blabbermouth	9/10
Metal Hammer Germany	4.5/7
Metalitalia.com	7.5/10
Sonic Perspectives	9/10

Emerald Seas is the second studio album by American symphonic metal band Seven Spires, released on February 14, 2020. While the album's sound is generally symphonic metal, the songs lean into different genres like electronic, jazz, classical, power metal, and melodic death metal, as well as elements of symphonic black metal and melodic rock. On February 14, 2025, the band released a five-year anniversary re-recording of the Japanese edition bonus track "The Road".

== Track listing ==
1. "Igne Defendit" – 1:59
2. "Ghost of a Dream" – 3:41
3. "No Words Exchanged" – 3:23
4. "Every Crest" – 3:57
5. "Unmapped Darkness" – 4:39
6. "Succumb" – 3:54
7. "Drowner of Worlds" – 5:06
8. "Silvery Moon" – 3:09
9. "Bury You" – 3:57
10. "Fearless" – 5:17
11. "With Love from the Other Side" – 1:33
12. "The Trouble with Eternal Life" – 4:39
13. "Emerald Seas (Overture)" – 3:48
14. "The Road" (Japanese edition bonus track) – 4:23

== Personnel ==
- Adrienne Cowan – vocals, keyboards
- Jack Kosto – guitars
- Peter de Reyna – bass
- Chris Dovas – drums
