= Solveig Jülich =

Swedish historian of ideas

Solveig Jülich is a Swedish historian of ideas, professor at the department of History of Science and Ideas at Uppsala University.

== Biography ==
Solveig Jülich holds a Ph.D in technology and social change from Linköping University in 2002, for which she was awarded the Swedish History of Science Society award for dissertations the next year. She had previously received the Swedish History of Science Society award for articles in 1998. She was employed as senior lecturer for the undergraduate programme in Culture, Society, Media Production at Linköping University (2003–2006). She was assistant professor, funded by the Swedish Research Council, at the Department of Literature and History of Ideas at Stockholm University (2006–2010) before becoming senior lecturer in history of ideas. In 2014, she joined the Department of History of Science and Ideas at Uppsala University. Jülich's research and teaching interests include Medical humanities, History of medicine and biomedicine, historical perspectives on ethics and value conflicts in medical research, and history of medicine's visual and material culture.

== Research ==
Her previous research projects have explored the introduction and reception of X-ray images, the interaction between medical science and media culture, and the making of the iconic images of embryos and foetuses by Swedish photographer Lennart Nilsson. She received the Johan Nordström and Sten Lindroth prize in 2003. At present she is responsible for the six-year research programme "Medicine at the borders of life: Fetal research and the emergence of ethical controversy in Sweden", funded by the Swedish Research Council. She is also a member of the steering group for the research programme “Science and modernisation in Sweden”, funded by Marianne and Marcus Wallenberg's foundation and hosted by the Center for the History of Science at the Swedish Academy of Sciences.

== Selected publications ==
- 1897: Media histories and the Stockholm exhibition, ed. with Anders Ekström & Pelle Snickars, Stockholm: Statens ljud- och bildarkiv, 2006; title in trans.
- Cultural history of media, ed. with Patrik Lundell & Pelle Snickars, Stockholm: Statens ljud- och bildarkiv, 2008; title in trans.
- History of participatory media: Politics and publics, 1750 – 2000, ed. with Anders Ekström, Frans Lundgren & Per Wisselgren, New York: Routledge, 2011
- The bus is the message: Perspectives on mobility, materiality, and modernity, ed. with Lotten Gustafsson Reinius & Ylva Habel, Stockholm: Kungliga biblioteket, 2013; title in trans.
- Lennart Nilsson's A Child Is Born: The Many Lives of a Best-Selling Pregnancy Advice Book, Culture Unbound, Journal of Current Cultural Research, 7(4): 627-648, 2015.
