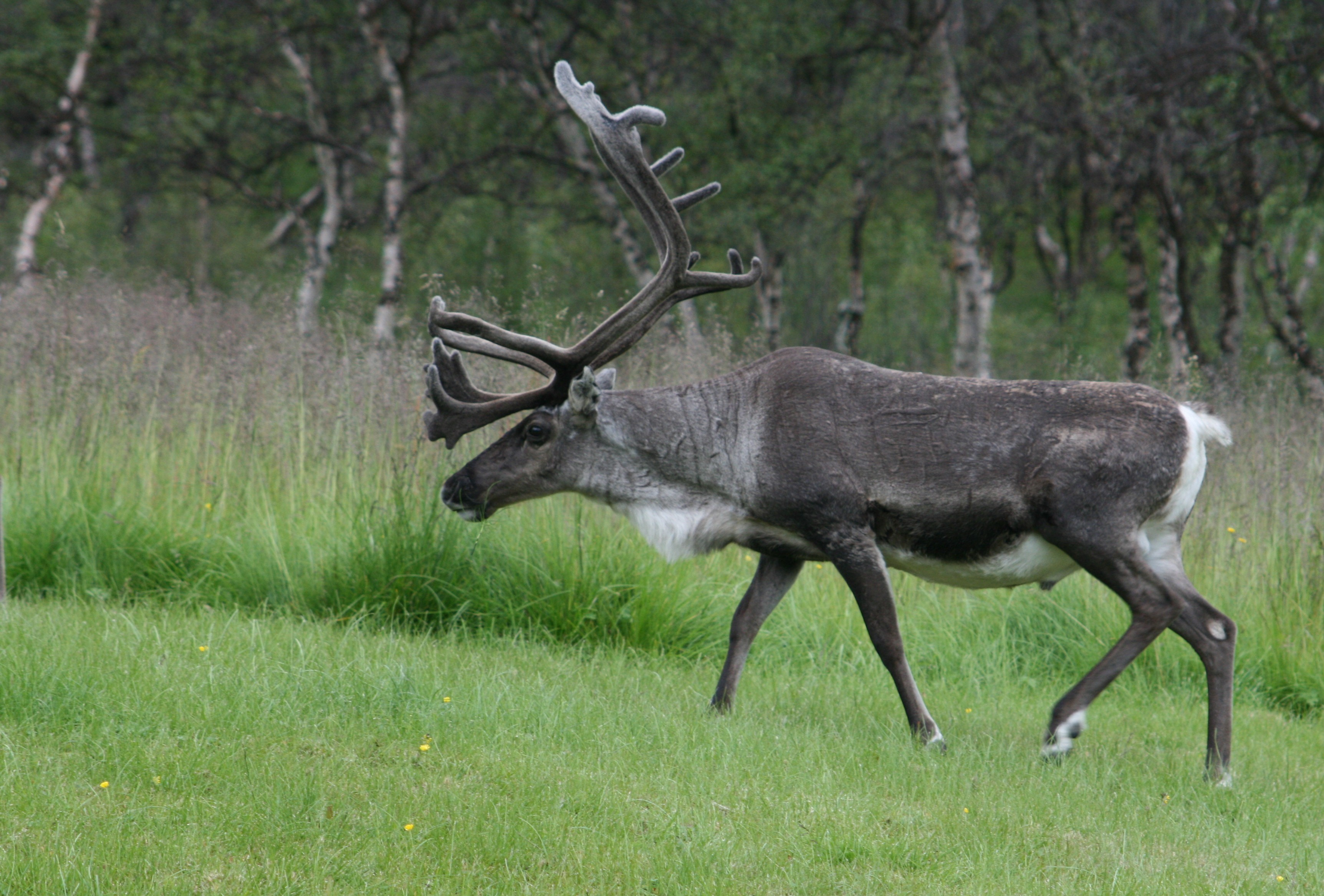

Scientific classification
- Kingdom: Animalia
- Phylum: Chordata
- Class: Mammalia
- Infraclass: Placentalia
- Order: Artiodactyla
- Family: Cervidae
- Subfamily: Capreolinae
- Genus: Rangifer
- Species: R. tarandus
- Subspecies: R. t. tarandus

Trinomial name
- Rangifer tarandus tarandus (Linnaeus, 1758)

= Mountain reindeer =

Subspecies of deer

The mountain reindeer (Rangifer tarandus tarandus), also called the Norwegian reindeer, northern reindeer, common reindeer or mountain caribou, is a mid-sized to large subspecies of the reindeer that is native to the western Scandinavian Peninsula, particularly Norway. In Norway, it is called fjellrein, villrein or tundra-rein.

== Description ==
Mountain reindeer are medium to large even-toed ungulates with a thick double coat that protects them from the Norwegian winter. Male reindeer (bulls) weigh on average 70 to 150 kg (154 to 331 pounds), while females (cows) weigh on average 40 to 100 kg (88 to 220 pounds). Both bulls and cows have antlers, but cows do not use them to battle one another; instead, like some bovids, they use their antlers to defend food or territory from intruders. Their summer coat is mostly pale brown with white rumps and, in some genetic variations, black legs and creamy-white necks. Their winter coat can be cream-white with beige shoulders and backs, or completely cream-white.

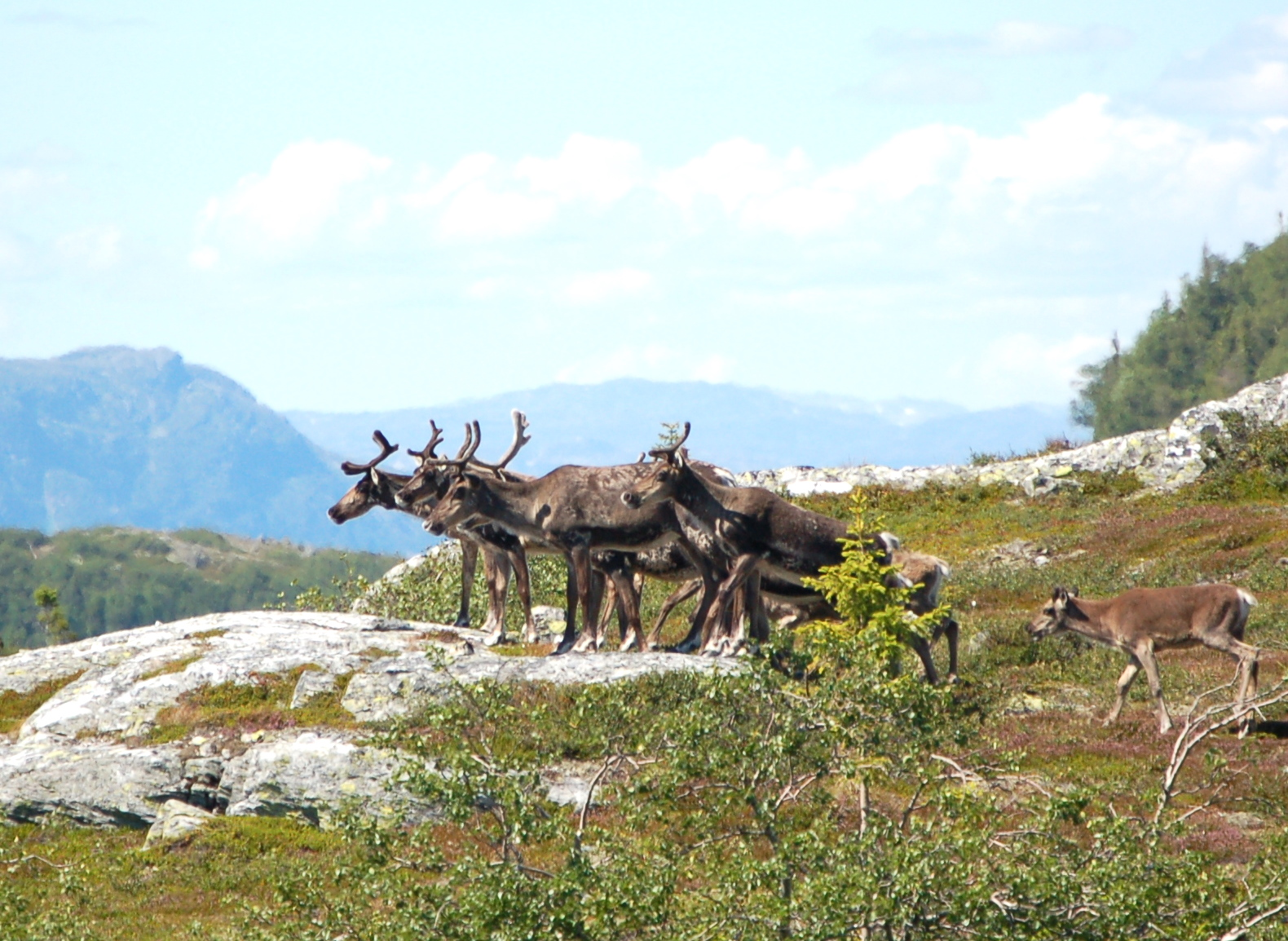
Mountain reindeer in their summer coat in Blefjell, Norway.

The mountain reindeer has several physiological adaptations to cope with different environmental temperatures. Reindeer have hemoglobin that allows for high oxygen unloading even at very cold temperatures. This is essential because reindeer limbs are often kept much colder than core body temperature, a phenomenon known as regional heterothermy. In warmer temperatures, reindeer can also switch from nasal breathing to open mouth panting for evaporative cooling.

=== Genetic variations ===
The northern and southern populations were once considered the same subspecies. However, genetic analysis shows that the reindeer found in Dovrefjell, in central Norway, are related to reindeer in Beringia, whereas the reindeer found in southern Norway, such as on the Hardangervidda plateau, are related to reindeer from southern Europe. They may have descended from the Finnish forest reindeer (R. fennicus fennicus) that historically occupied parts of Eastern Europe.

== Distribution and range ==
Currently, wild mountain reindeer can only be found in western Scandinavia, with the biggest populations residing in central and southern Norway. The total population in Norway is between 70,000 and 80,000, with the largest numbers found in Sør-Trøndelag, Nord-Trøndelag and northern Hedmark. A smaller population, 6,000 to 7,000, is found in Hardangervidda.

=== Conservation status ===
The wild populations are indirectly controlled by the Norwegian government. Mountain reindeer in Norway were totally protected from 1902 to 1906. However, a few years after that, the population sank again. In the 1920s, it was estimated to be just 2,700. In the 1930s, quotas were introduced to limit the hunting of reindeer. These regulations, along with migrating reindeer, helped increase the population. By the mid-1990s, the wild reindeer population had rebounded to more than 30,000. Today, mountain reindeer are commonly hunted for food or as trophies.

=== Compared to domestic reindeer ===
The domestic reindeer currently has a population in Norway of about 1.2 million. It has historically played a huge role as a game-hunting animal, a source of food and an alternative choice to pull ploughs when horses were unavailable. Domestic reindeer — which are technically only semi-domesticated, as they will still run wild if given the chance — are one of the most common sources of meat in Norway, particularly in the north, where the Sami people reside, and where domestic cattle are rarer because they cannot survive the cold winters as well as reindeer can. In the south, reindeer meat is eaten often as a traditional Sunday meal or during seasonal events.

== Predators ==
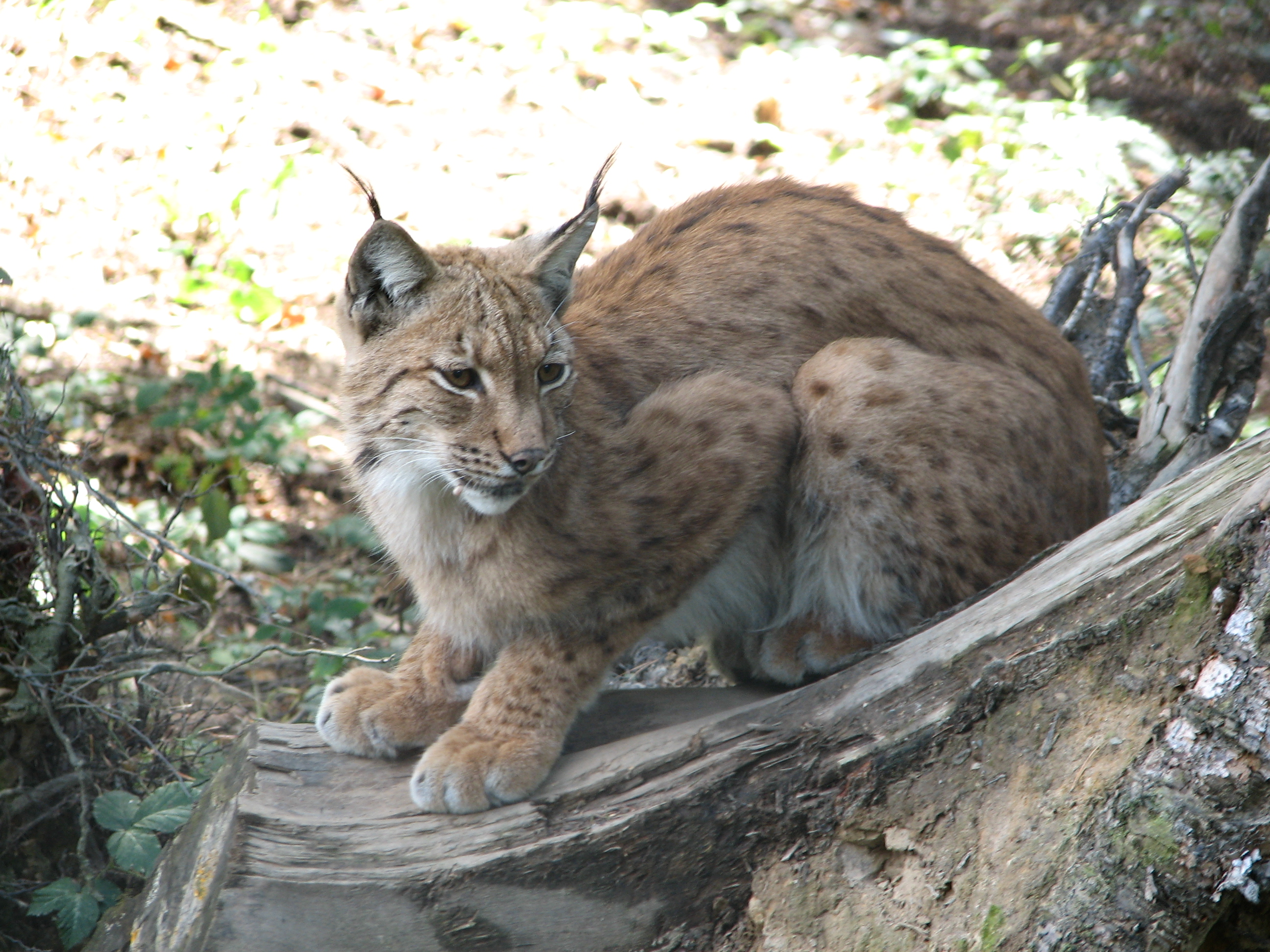
The Eurasian lynx (Lynx lynx), the biggest threat to juvenile reindeer

Because the mountain reindeer is so large, it has very few natural predators aside from human hunters. However, lynx and wolverines sometimes prey on young, old or sick reindeer. The brown bear has the strength to tackle an adult female, but it would rather scavenge from the carrion left by lynx or wolverines, or steal their kill, instead of hunting for itself. Wolves are also powerful enough to tackle adult reindeer, but because of the strict control of wolves in Norway, a pack would almost certainly be spotted and killed before it could do so.

The lynx is the biggest natural threat to mountain reindeer because its small size makes it a perfect ambush predator. Lynx are too small to tackle a healthy adult bull or cow, so they generally target calves. Wolverines follow a similar hunting strategy, although, unlike lynx, they are capable of tackling adult reindeer.
