= Loch Morlich =

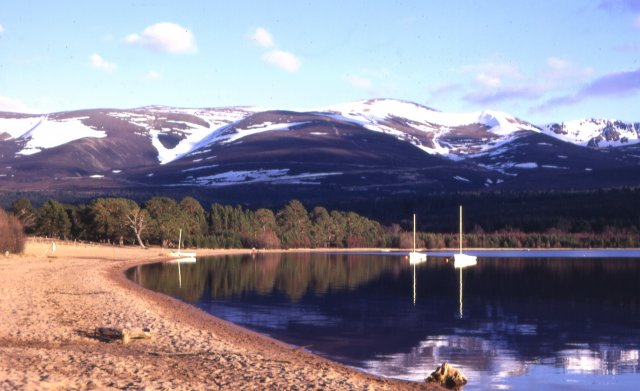

- Location within Highland
- Location: Badenoch and Strathspey, Highland, Scotland
- Coordinates: 57°10′N 3°42′W
- Type: freshwater loch
- Basin countries: Scotland

Loch Morlich (Scottish Gaelic, Loch Mhùrlaig) is a freshwater loch in the Badenoch and Strathspey area of Highland, Scotland near Aviemore. The loch is home to a watersports centre with kayaking, sailing, and windsurfing among the activities available. There is also a yacht club and cycling routes around the loch. The loch is at the foot of the Cairngorm mountains, just a few miles from Aviemore.

Long stretches of its shoreline are formed of sandy beaches. In 2009, these beaches received a Seaside Award by the Keep Scotland Beautiful (KSB) campaign, the first time that this had been given to a freshwater loch. At 300 metres above sea level, it also became the highest beach to be given this award.

When examined closely the sand of these beaches contains large amounts of broken glass. However, this glass does not come from careless tourists discarding bottles irresponsibly but was, in fact, left over from World War II when the area around Loch Morlich was used as a commando school. In particular, it was used as a training area for the Kompani Linge (the Norwegian Independent (army) Company, trained by the British Special Operations Executive) because of the close resemblance of the area, both in landscape and climate, to Norway. Members of the unit trained in railway sabotage on the old disued Aviemore and Coylumbridge Timber Railway. A memorial to the Kompani Linge can be found outside the Glenmore Forest Park visitor centre.
