= Espen Barth Eide =

Norwegian politician and political scientist

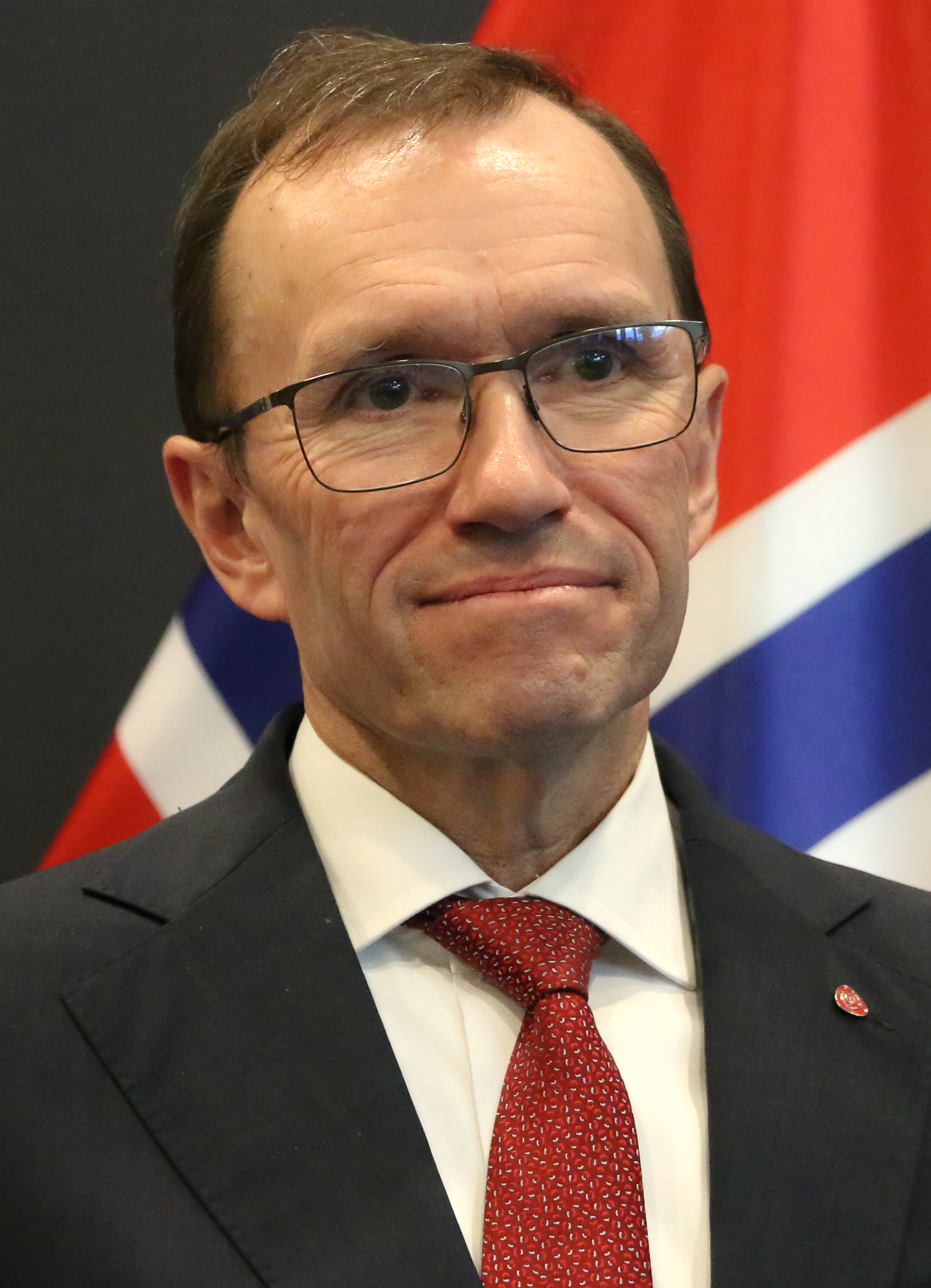
- Barth Eide in 2025

Minister of Foreign Affairs
- Incumbent
- Assumed office 16 October 2023
- Prime Minister: Jonas Gahr Støre
- Preceded by: Anniken Huitfeldt
- In office 21 September 2012 – 16 October 2013
- Prime Minister: Jens Stoltenberg
- Preceded by: Jonas Gahr Støre
- Succeeded by: Børge Brende

Minister of Climate and the Environment
- In office 14 October 2021 – 16 October 2023
- Prime Minister: Jonas Gahr Støre
- Preceded by: Sveinung Rotevatn
- Succeeded by: Andreas Bjelland Eriksen

Minister of Defence
- In office 11 November 2011 – 21 September 2012
- Prime Minister: Jens Stoltenberg
- Preceded by: Grete Faremo
- Succeeded by: Anne-Grete Strøm-Erichsen

Member of the Storting
- In office 1 October 2017 – 30 September 2025
- Deputy: Siri Staalesen
- Constituency: Oslo

Personal details
- Born: 1 May 1964 (age 62) Oslo, Norway
- Party: Labour
- Spouse: Paloma Rosón Hernández
- Children: 3
- Education: University of Oslo; Autonomous University of Barcelona

Military service
- Allegiance: Norway
- Branch/service: Navy

Espen Barth Eide (born 1 May 1964) is a Norwegian politician and political scientist. He is currently serving as the Minister of Foreign Affairs in Jonas Gahr Støre's government, having previously done so under Jens Stoltenberg. He was a member of the Norwegian Parliament for Oslo from 2017 to 2025, representing the Labour Party. He was elected to this seat in the 2017 election, and reelected in the 2021 election. From 2017 to 2021, Eide was the Labour Party's spokesperson for Energy, Climate and Environment. He also served as Minister of Climate and the Environment between 2021 and 2023.

On 22 August 2014, Barth Eide was appointed United Nations special adviser on Cyprus by former UN secretary-general Ban Ki-moon. He continued in this capacity under current secretary-general António Guterres until 14 August 2017, when he stepped down from his UN role in order to engage in the election campaign in Norway.

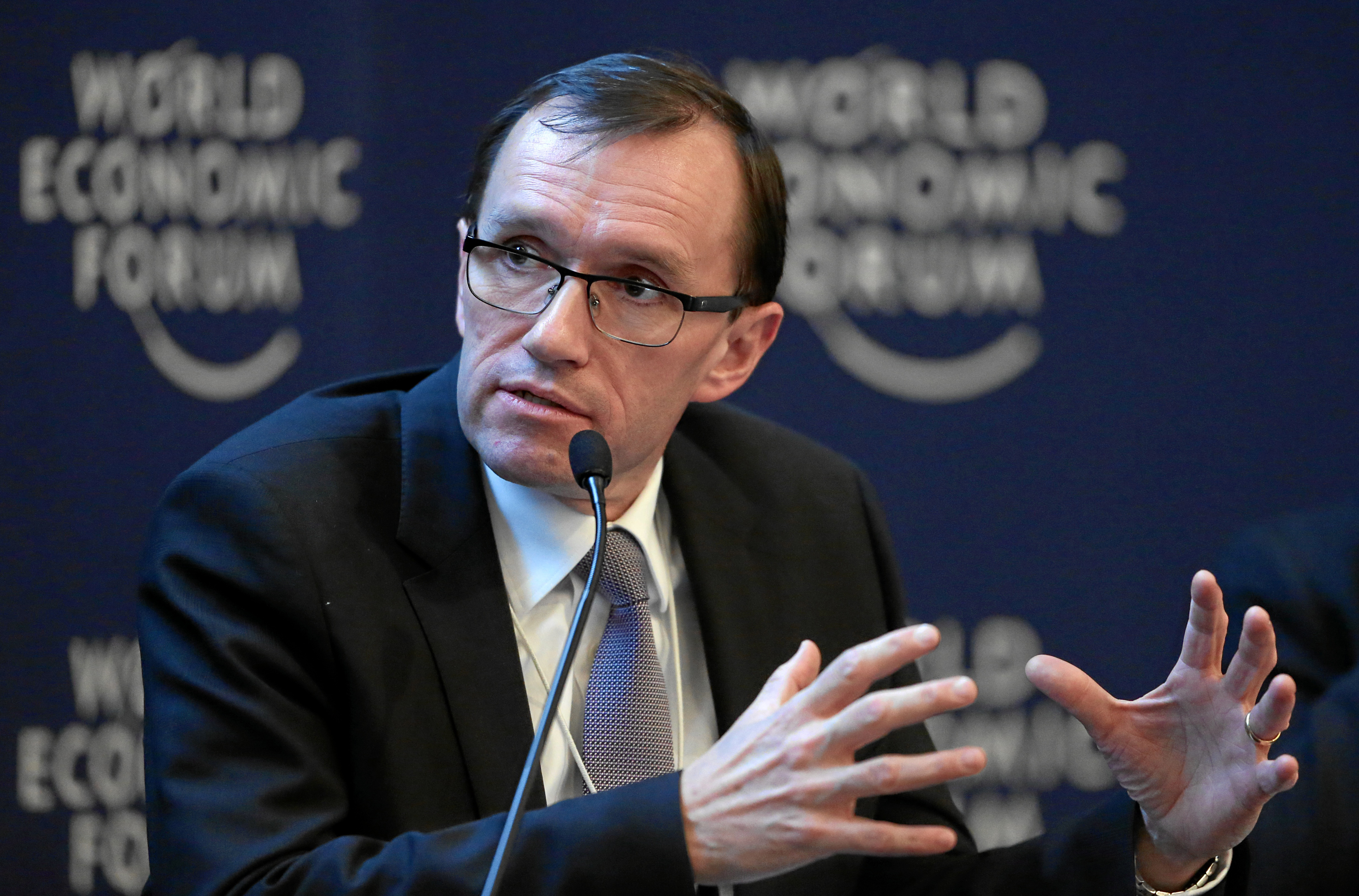
Eide during the WEF 2013

From 2014 to 2016 he served as managing director and member of the managing board at the World Economic Forum in Geneva.

Barth Eide served as Norway's Minister of Defence in Stoltenberg's Second Cabinet from 2011 to 2012, and subsequently as Minister of Foreign Affairs until 2013. Since December 2013, Barth Eide has served as a member of the board of the Centre for Humanitarian Dialogue (HD). He was chair of the Board until 14 October 2021. He was a member of the boards of Stockholm International Peace Research Institute (SIPRI) and the Norwegian Atlantic Committee until the same date.

== Early life and education ==
Eide is the son of the jurist, human rights academic, and author Asbjørn Eide (1933–2026) and Professor of nutritional physiology Wenche Barth Eide (b. Barth 1935). He attended the Oslo Cathedral School and graduated from the University of Oslo in 1993 with a cand.polit. degree. He also attended the Autonomous University of Barcelona as an exchange student.

Eide joined the Labour Party in 1979 and in the 1980s held positions in AUF (Labour Party Youth). He was secretary-general of the European Movement Norway in 1992-1993 and had a role in the campaign for Norwegian membership in the EU in 1994.

== Norwegian Institute of International Affairs (NUPI) ==
In 1993, Eide began working as a researcher in the United Nations Program at the Norwegian Institute of International Affairs (NUPI). He became Head of this program in 1996, later working as an advisor to the panel on Threats, Challenges and Change and the Report on Integrated Missions. In 2002 he became the head of NUPI's Department of International Politics, a position he held until he returned to Government in 2005.

== Political career ==
During Jens Stoltenberg's first term as Prime Minister, from 2000 to 2001, Eide served as a State Secretary at the Ministry of Foreign Affairs. When the Stoltenberg's second cabinet took office after the 2005 election, Eide became a State Secretary at the Ministry of Foreign Affairs. In 2010, he again served as a State Secretary at the Ministry of Foreign Affairs. On 11 November 2011, he was appointed to the post of Minister of Defence. On 21 September 2012, he was appointed to the post of Minister of Foreign Affairs, succeeding Jonas Gahr Støre.

From 2001 to 2013, Eide was a member of the Presidency of the Party of European Socialists. In 2004, he led a policy review on integrated missions commissioned by the UN Secretariat. He also served as adviser to the High-Level Panel on UN Reform, which concluded its work in 2005. He has also been active in the World Economic Forum since 2003, and a regular attendee of the Munich Security Conference since 2006.

=== Parliament ===
After the resignation of Jens Stoltenberg's Government in October 2013, following the 2013 election, he temporarily left Norwegian politics, but returned to Norway and was elected as Member of Parliament for the Oslo Labour Party in the 2017 election. He was re-elected in 2021. In Parliament, he sat in the Standing Committee on Energy and the Environment and also served as its first vice chair between 2017 and 2021. Concurrently he was also the party's spokesperson on energy, climate and environmental issues. While serving in government from 2021, his seat was covered by deputy representative Siri Staalesen. He announced in August 2024 that he wouldn't seek re-election at the 2025 election.

=== Minister of Defence ===
Eide was appointed as defence minister by Prime Minister Jens Stoltenberg on 11 November 2011 after Grete Faremo was appointed minister of justice. Eide described his new position as "a great responsibility" and said he would not make "revolutionary changes".

In March 2012, Eide criticized NATO secretary-general Anders Fogh Rasmussens for saying that he was open to the possibility of using information gained under torture. Eide said that in his view this was "unacceptable", saying that it violated international conventions.

In June 2012, Eide made the opening remarks at a seminar in Oslo on "Masculinity and the Military", saying that Norway was beginning the "final stage of the transformation of the armed forces", taking "a fundamentally new approach to how we recruit, invest in and maintain a pool of highly qualified personnel." In addition to "recruiting those who can run long distances and carry a heavy back pack", he explained, the military would seek to "attract those who are especially skilled in new technologies. Young people who can make an impact on system and strategy thinking. Indeed we need women and men who are inclined to find cyberspace more fascinating than wildlife and hiking."

=== Minister of Foreign Affairs (first term) ===
Prime Minister Stoltenberg named Eide minister of foreign affairs on 21 September 2012 in a cabinet reshuffle.

==== 2012 ====
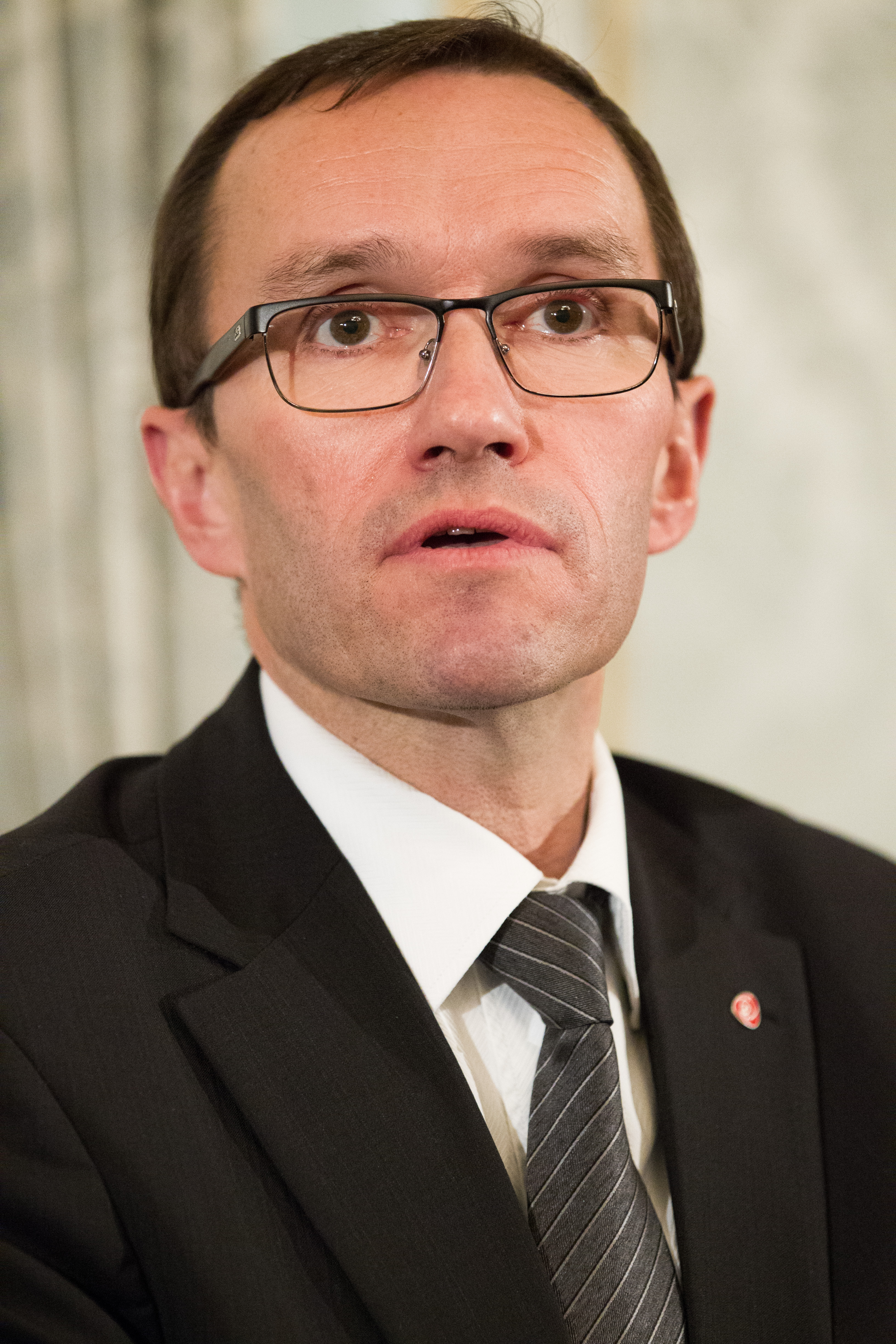
Eide in 2012

In December 2012, Eide urged the United Kingdom to remain in the EU.

==== 2013 ====
At an Arctic Frontiers conference in Tromsø in January 2013, Eide signed a Host Country Agreement between Norway and the Arctic Council, establishing a permanent secretariat for the council in that city.

At a joint press conference on 12 March 2013 in Washington, D.C., with newly appointed U.S. Secretary of State John Kerry, Eide said that Norway was working "closely with the Syrian opposition", by providing humanitarian aid and, "trying to help them to set up local council inside Syria." But Norway, like the U.S., was not yet, "actively arming the rebels", though it agreed with the U.S. that "President Assad has lost all credibility, he must go. We need to work with the Syrian opposition, we need to help them to unify, we need to help them to consolidate messages, and we need to make sure that the Security Council finally is able to come to a kind of joint position in this issue. And I think on these issues we are very much of the same approach."

In March 2013, Eide addressed the first-ever governmental conference on the humanitarian consequences of nuclear weapons. "Time is not on our side", he told the audience. "The technology exists, on more hands, and we know that more states and non-state groups are contemplating acquiring real weapons. On top of this, comes the risk of accidental detonation, for instance due to improper handling of nuclear weapons."

In April 2013, Eide declared that a new wave of violence in the state of Rakhine in Myanmar should not be considered identical to earlier conflicts in that country, which resulted from government oppression. He expressed confidence that Burmese authorities were taking the situation seriously and were eager to establish reconciliation and peace.

Eide hailed the "historic agreement" between Serbia and Kosovo in April 2013 which resolved all outstanding questions between the two countries. Meeting with Serbian First Deputy Prime Minister Aleksandar Vučić in Belgrade, Eide said that even though Norway is not a member of the EU, it strongly supports Serbia's EU pathway.

=== Minister of Climate and the Environment ===
On 14 October 2021, Eide was appointed Minister of Climate and the Environment in Støre's Cabinet.

==== 2021 ====
Barth Eide and Minister of Trade and Industry Jan Christian Vestre announced that the government would work actively to cut emissions, with him saying: "We must dispose of the emissions we have left in the best possible way. We will look for the most rational, cost-effective and efficient measures that reduce emissions in all sectors of society".

Barth Eide expressed that an overview over climate emissions from consumption could be necessary. He further said it was something Norway should become better at, but couldn't yet say when such a process would be started. However, he did reassure that it would be started gradually over time.

Early into the 2021 United Nations Climate Change Conference in Glasgow, Barth Eide said it was also too early to say if any significant progress could be made. He did however stress the importance of the work against climate change and putting 1,5 degrees as a target for the world to reach. He also advised that money that goes to climate adaption should be tripled.

Barth Eide stated that Greta Thunberg's statements of the seriousness of the climate crisis were acceptable, but he further warned that saying that the policies and the conference being useless, would be heading down a dangerous path. He further added a message to Thunberg and her supporters: "I believe that the strong and sensible commitment to make something happen must be converted into political action, not into rejecting the whole idea of democratic political change. It's a bit important to get that balance in order there, and that is my message to Greta Thunberg and those who cheer her on".

In late November, Eide approved the culling of 26 wolves living in various parts of Norway. On the issue, he commented: "The Ministry of Climate and the Environment has dealt with complaints about the predatory game committees' decisions on licensing of up to 26 wolves outside the wolf zone. We have not found grounds to change the decision. They are therefore final". The wolves are a critical endangered species in Norway.

==== 2022 ====
Barth Eide received criticism from the Socialist Left Party in January 2022 after having spoken "warmly" about the country's oil and gas industry in a meeting with the European Union's Commissioner for Climate Action Frans Timmermans. The party's spokesperson for climate policy, Lars Haltbrekken, stated that his party "fears that fossil gas will displace renewable and emission-free energy". He also indicated that the party would question Barth Eide about the matter, and to "get him to realise that fossil energy is not the solution, not even in a temporary period". Barth Eide responded to the criticism, saying: "In an ideal world, one should really say that only completely green things are green. But part of the problem with taxonomy is that everything has to be green at once. Then you will not catch the transition from brown to green, which the gas can be if it replaces coal, but which it is not if it replaces wind. As long as you aim for zero emissions in the end, then this is a natural part of the way there".

Barth Eide and his predecessor, Sveinung Rotevatn, both agreed that Norwegian politicians hasn't done enough to fight against climate change. Either he or Rotevatn expressed that the 1.5 °C target wasn't impossible to reach, although it could be difficult.

In response to a joint letter from governors and mayors from the area surrounding the Oslo fjord regarding nitrogen pollution, Barth Eide responded saying that he appreciated the enthusiasm regarding the issue. He also promised to meet the effected local leaders regarding measures to strengthen nitrogen purification and solutions to other issues mentioned in the letter.

In early February, Eide announced that the government had won in the appeal court against a temporary injunction to further cull 26 wolves inside the designated wolf zone. The culling of the wolves started the very next day, bringing the Norwegian wolf even closer to extinction.

After the Centre Party's parliamentary leader Marit Arnstad had suggested that Norway's climate good may have to be pushed back, Eide responded, saying that they would not do so. He also stated that going back on climate ambitions was not the way forward, but instead opt to maintain them and or strengthen them. He also noted that the strategy to reach said targets were not specific, but the goal is binding. Eide also didn't rule out tightening the grip on the climate goal.

On 30 May, he announced the establishment of a new environmental council, which would only be so in name, and would officially be a "council for fair workplace adjustment". The intended purpose is for workers and their employers to offer solutions. Barth Eide stated: "This applies to steel and smelters, it applies to cement production and heavy industry. We must come up with solutions for chemical processes and new energy sources to manage this, together". Although environmental groups expressed understanding for the inclusion of workers and employers, they were critical of being left out, despite having previously been invited to similar councils to either negotiate or handle questions of political solutions. The leader of the Norwegian Society for the Conservation of Nature, Truls Gulowsen, said: "Of course, we agree that the labour partners should have a central role, but this does not preclude others from being involved, especially if the council is to have real significance in the work with record-breaking emission cuts".

On 22 June, it was announced that the government would establish protection over Lopphavet, making it the largest ocean protected area in the country. Eide stated: "We have targeted the protection measures against the natural values that were important to protect". Despite the ocean's protection, fishing would still be allowed in it, to which he said: "It will have little effect on the activity that is there today. We have received great local support for the measure". The only exception would be two coral areas. The protection of the area would be headed by Alta Municipality, Hasvik Municipality, and Loppa Municipality, along with Troms og Finnmark county and the Sámi Parliament of Norway.

While attending the United Nations ocean conference on 27 June, Barth Eide announced that the Norwegian government would be establishing an ocean environmental law. The law would allow the government to establish protection areas reaching up to 200 nautical miles. He said: "Once we have the law in place, we can establish protection in all of the sea Norway manages. This is closely linked to what Norway and the UN want. We must become better at managing the sea in a sustainable way".

On 29 August, Dagbladet revealed that Barth Eide and his ministry had rejected a request from Ukraine regarding the need for personal protective equipment for rangers in the country. The rejection letter stated that Norway didn't have the equipment in question available for donation.

On 6 October, as part of the state budget for 2023, Barth Eide presented plans to tackle climate change in what he dubbed "the green book". The budget included plans to cut emissions from 23.9 million tons to 23.2 million, while additional measures would assist it being fill the gap of 0.2 million. Environmental organisations reacted widely negative to the budget proposal for climate and environment issues, citing the cuts were insufficient to reach Norway's climate goal in 2030.

In early November, Liberal Party leader Guri Melby accused Barth Eide of hiding the real figures for car emissions in a Norwegian Automobile Federation report. State Secretary Ragnhild Syrstad, on Barth Eide's behalf, assured that progress was being made on selling electricity cars and reach the 2025 target.

While attending the 2022 United Nations Climate Change Conference in Egypt, Eide defended Norway's position on confusing to produce oil while also calling for increased climate costs. He added that he wasn't impressed by the notion of stopping oil production and the sudden occurrence of an energy revolution, also that oil among other things, should be phased out gradually.

Eide attended the 2022 United Nations Biodiversity Conference in Montreal, where he encouraged cooperation between countries to solve the nature crisis. He also led the end-negotiations at the conference and also expressed hope for a solution by the end of its duration. On 19 December, a nature agreement was made by all countries at the conference. Barth Eide praised the agreement, also praising it for its "clear language". The agreement had however been blocked by DR Congo before being ratified.

==== 2023 ====
In January 2023, Barth Eide was a part of a Norwegian delegation visiting the Troll Research Station in Antarctica. He also announced that the government had tasked the Norwegian Directorate of Public Construction and Property to consider building new facilities for the research station worth 3 billion NOK, with a doubling capacity for 65 to 100 people.

After the European Parliament passed climate legislation in April, which notably included the Carbon Border Adjustment Mechanism (CBAM); Bath Eide argued that it isn't formally a tariff. He also specified that the EU had stated so and that it is part of their quota system. He also stated that the government would take the legislation into consideration if it's relevant for the EEA.

In July, Barth Eide approved a felling permit for a female brown bear and her cubs after the Norwegian Environment Agency had originally rejected a request by sheep and goat farmers in Nord-Trøndelag. The Ministry of Climate and the Environment asked this request be reversed and action taken against the brown bear and her cubs as soon as possible. Both Barth Eide and the ministry argued the reason for the approval was to "lift the tax burden on the grazing industry". However, a few days later the Oslo District Court forbade environmental authorities from executing the order until the decision had been considered to be legal.

Eide told Klassekampen in August, that the opposition to wind power in recent times had gone too far. He also acknowledged that there were wrongs in the Fosen ruling, while also criticising parts of the environmental movement for seemingly dismissing the proposal of wind power.

In September, the government announced that they would make future motorways slimmer in order to save the environment, reuse existing roads and decrease intervention in nature. Barth Eide argued that there would be less intervention in the nature if pre-existing roads were expanded upon.

On 16 October, Barth Eide was reassigned during a cabinet reshuffle.

=== Minister of Foreign Affairs (second term) ===
On 16 October 2023, Barth Eide was reappointed minister of foreign affairs in a cabinet reshuffle.

==== 2023 ====
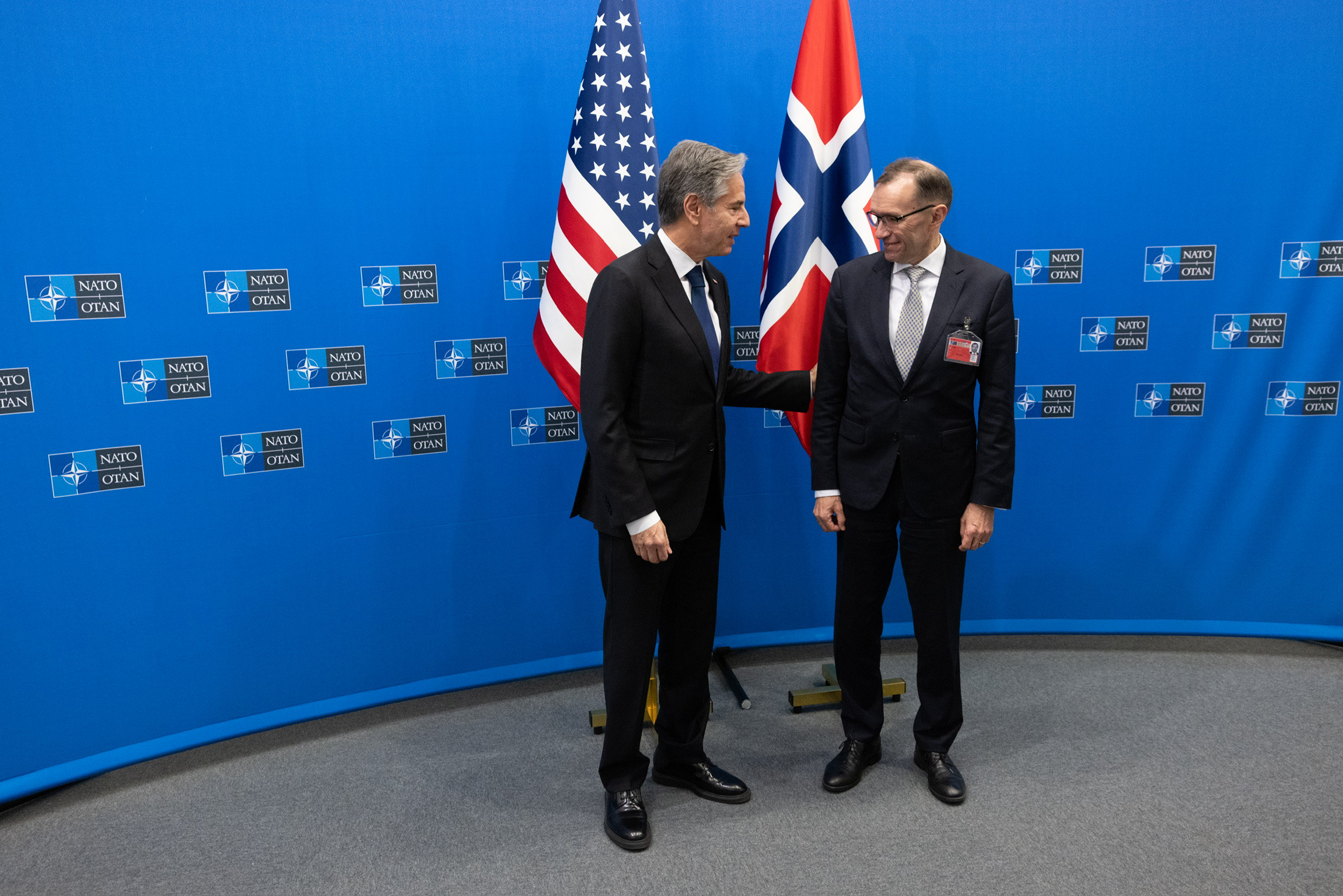
Barth Eide with US Secretary of State Antony Blinken in November 2023

Shortly after his re-appointment, Barth Eide oversaw Norway's response to the Gaza war. After a UN resolution which Norway supported, Barth Eide stated that "Israel is burning sympathy" with their continuous attacks in the Gaza Strip. He did reiterate that Israel had the right to self defence, but that it should be within the boundaries of warfare. His comments sparked outrage from the Israeli embassy, who encouraged other countries to support Hamas to leave the war zone rather than condemn Israel.

On 15 November, Barth Eide and prime minister Jonas Gahr Støre announced that Norwegian citizens stranded in the Gaza Strip had been evacuated to Egypt by bus.

At a NATO foreign ministers summit in late November, Barth Eide expressed concern about different standards regarding the Russian invasion of Ukraine and the Gaza war. He said there was lack of criticism against Israel's blockade of the Gaza strip as a key issue, additionally expressing concern about global support for Ukraine dwindling.

In December, Barth Eide attended a summit in Oslo, meeting with his other European and Middle Eastern counterparts to discuss a two state solution regarding Israel and Palestine. He said that some countries had to be "the adults at home in this dreadful situation" regarding an approach to the ongoing Gaza war.

==== 2024 ====
In January, he expressed concern about Israel's attacks on the Gaza Strip and labelled their actions as possible war crimes and breaches of humanitarian law. He did however abstain from referring to it as genocide, and also rejected calls for sanctioning Israel economically. He did however mention that Norway had been in discussions with other countries about visa sanctions against Israeli settlers and settlers who have practised violence. Later that month, he opined that there was no other option than a two state solution after Israeli prime minister Benjamin Netanyahu rejected the idea of establishing a Palestinian state should the war in Gaza end. Barth Eide furthermore called Netanyahu's rejection "concerning" and a violation of the Oslo accords.

Following Israeli accusations against some UNRWA staff taking part in the Hamas attack on Israel, Barth Eide announced that Norway would continue its financial support to the agency. He welcomed the investigation launched into the allegations, while also highlighting the importance of continued aid to people in the Gaza Strip.

In late February, he indicated that Norway support Dutch prime minister Mark Rutte's candidacy for NATO Secretary General, succeeding Jens Stoltenberg.

Barth Eide announced in March that the government would advise against Norwegian companies doing business with Israeli settlements.

Following the 2024 Russian presidential election, Barth Eide called the election "undemocratic" and "not free and fair". He also met with Russians living in Norway who oppose Vladimir Putin to discuss challenges facing Russians living in Norway, notably asylum applications.

Barth Eide warned in April against Iran retaliating against Israel following the Israeli bombing of the Iranian embassy in Damascus. He warned the country against causing more escalation in the Israel-Palestine conflict and against retaliatory actions. His ministry furthermore issued a warning to Norwegians in Israel about the possibility of an Iranian attack on the country in the coming days.

Speaking to God morgen Norge in late April, Barth Eide opened for Norway to recognise Palestine as a country over the course of spring. However, he noted that Norway would recognise Palestine if persuaded by a group of countries aiming for the same objective. Norway officially recognised Palestine as a country on 22 May.

During a May Day event in Drammen he smiled and posed for a photo with Mona Osman, a Norwegian politician who is the daughter of extradited and accused Palestinian terrorist Walid Osman, who held a sign saying "Fuck Israel Fuck Capitalism Fuck NATO".

Following the assassination of Ismail Haniyeh, Barth Eide expressed concerns for further escalation in the region and warned against retaliatory actions from either Hamas, Hezbollah or Iran. He did suggest that Haniyeh's assassination could be a turning point for the need of a ceasefire and warned that "retaliation upon retaliation does not work".

Following Israeli prime minister Benjamin Netanyahu's rejection of withdrawing troops from the Philadelphi Corridor in early September, Barth Eide expressed that Netanyahu was adding further demands, which would make a ceasefire more harder to reach. He further emphasised that a ceasefire would be the only way to secure the release of other hostages and that both Israel and Hamas had breached multiple founding principles of international law.

In the wake of the death of Hezbollah leader Hassan Nasrallah in late September, Barth Eide called for an end to hostilities in Lebanon and for a ceasefire both there and in Gaza. He furthermore emphasised the need for political solutions that could last.

Barth Eide and his Nordic counterparts signed a joint letter in late October condemning Israel's draft bills that would seek to ban the UNRWA from operating in the country and in effect the Palestinian areas. Furthermore, they urged the Knesset to reconsider passing the bill. Once the bills had been passed, Eide issued his condemnation and added that Norway would be seeking to ask the ICJ about the legality of the ban and whether or not it violates international law.

During a OSCE meeting in Malta in December, Barth Eide accused Russia of violating the Helsinki Accords, notably emphasising violations of human rights and the principle of another state not intervening in another state's internal affairs.

==== 2025 ====
Shortly before the second inauguration of Donald Trump, Barth Eide praised him for the ceasefire agreement in Gaza and expressed that Trump's incoming presidency could be good news for the Middle East. He further stated it would be detrimental to secure a peace agreement for Ukraine and important for Europe that this would be done.

With news of US President Donald Trump starting peace talks with Russia and Ukraine, Eide argued that Ukraine should have a seat at the table to set the premises of a peace agreement. Furthermore, he argued that a possible NATO membership for Ukraine shouldn't be ruled out and that negotiations shouldn't only be left to Trump and Vladimir Putin.

Ahead of a NATO foreign ministers summit in April, Eide echoed US Secretary of State Marco Rubio's sentiment that European countries should strengthen their defence capabilities within NATO. However, he did criticise this in potentially being contradictory given the US's imposed tariffs on European imports, which he feared could lead to a recession and thereby making it difficult for European countries to spend more on defence.

Despite having received criticism from the Israeli government for his criticism of their actions against Palestinians, Eide was personally invited to Jerusalem by them to speak about antisemitism at the 2025 IHRA conference in May. While there he also met with representatives of the Israeli government and emphasised the Norwegian stance regarding the ongoing conflict and antisemitism. He also remarked that "there is room to do better" in combating antisemitism.

Eide met with US Secretary of State Marco Rubio in June to discuss the conflict in the Middle East, Ukraine, Arctic security and the upcoming NATO summit. Eide highlighted the importance of Iran not having nuclear weapons and also the US' role in ensuring a deal which would see Iran stripped of nuclear weapons in the future, which he argued would be dangerous for the region. He would also not rule out the possibility of US involvement in the war.

Upon the second anniversary of the Gaza war, Eide commented that he was a "cautious optimist" about Donald Trump's proposed peace plan for Gaza, but he also noted that Trump's plan has served as a crucial step towards a potential end to the conflict.

==== 2026 ====
Following the US strikes in Venezuela, Eide commented that the actions were in violation of international law, the Prohibition on the Use of Force of the UN Charter and state immunity. He also expressed support for the rejection of Nicolas Maduro's claimed victory at the 2024 Venezuelan presidential election and that a potential democratic transition should take precedence from the actual results of said election.

Eide hosted Danish foreign minister Lars Løkke Rasmussen during his visit to Oslo and expressed Norwegian support for Denmark over the Greenland crisis. Furthermore, he stated that Norway and Denmark "will not be pressured through threats of American tariffs" and that they would work together with other countries threatened by American tariffs.

At a press conference in February, Eide issued an apology after it was revealed that one of his sons had become an intern at the Norwegian embassy in Paris after he had failed to uphold impartiality rules and not asked the government to appoint an interim minister to overlook his son's application process. Prime Minister Jonas Gahr Støre expressed that he still had confidence in Eide and commended him for his willingness to solve the issue.

In June, he hailed a budget agreement with the government's supporting parties in parliament which would seek to establish a trade ban against Israeli settlements in the West Bank. He called the proposal historic and described it as going further than any other European countries. According to him, it's also the first time the Norwegian government has presented a proposal to sanction Israeli settlements. The proposal has been sent for parliamentary hearing with a deadline for 19 September. Days ahead of the vote, he expressed optimism that the proposal would be passed and also pushed for individuals or companies who traded with settlers should face three years imprisonment. Around the same time, Norway joined eleven other countries in supporting sanctions against Israel.

== Chair of the Board, Centre for Humanitarian Dialogue ==
In December 2013, Eide joined the board of the Centre for Humanitarian Dialogue (HD), a private diplomacy organisation whose mission is to help mitigate armed violence through dialogue and mediation. Since 2016 he was Vice Chair and from June 2019, he has been the chair of the board of the Centre for Humanitarian Dialogue. He resigned from this post when he was appointed minister on 14 October 2021.

== Board memberships, SIPRI and The Norwegian Atlantic Committee ==
Eide was a member of the board of the Stockholm International Peace Research Institute (SIPRI) from 2017 to 2021, and was a board member of the Norwegian Institute of International Affairs (NUPI) from 2014 to 2017. From 2017 to 2021, he was a member of the board of the Norwegian Atlantic Committee and a member of the European Leadership Network (ELN) in London.

== Special Adviser for Cyprus ==
In 2014, he was appointed UN secretary-general Ban Ki-moon's special adviser for Cyprus. As a UN Under-Secretary General, Eide led the United Nations Good Offices Mission in Cyprus for three years. In 2016, after two years of intensified negotiations and liaison, he stated that both sides are strongly committed to the peace process and that settlement discussions are held without taboos on all issues. He was reappointed in this position by Secretary General António Guterres in 2017. An International Conference on Cyprus was inaugurated on 12 January 2017 in Geneva, but closed without having arrived at a final settlement at its last session in Crans-Montana, Switzerland, on 6 July 2017.

On 14 August 2017, he announced his resignation as UN special envoy to Cyprus in order to run for elected office in Norway. A new Special Adviser has so far not been appointed and negotiations have not resumed.

== Personal life ==
Barth Eide is married to Paloma Rosón Hernández, with whom he has three sons: Eivind, Gabriel and Olav. He met his wife in the late 1980s in Barcelona, when they were both active in the European Movement. His oldest son was at Utøya at the time of the 2011 Norway attacks, and ultimately survived it.

Political offices
Preceded by Grete Faremo	Minister of Defence; 2011–2012	Succeeded by Anne-Grete Strøm-Erichsen
Preceded by Jonas Gahr Støre	Minister of Foreign Affairs; 2012–2013	Succeeded by Børge Brende
Preceded by Terje Aasland	First Vice Chair of the Standing Committee on Energy and the Environment; 2017–2021	Succeeded by Lan Marie Berg
Preceded by Sveinung Rotevatn	Minister of Climate and the Environment; 2021–2023	Succeeded by Andreas Bjelland Eriksen
Preceded by Anniken Huitfeldt	Minister of Foreign Affairs; 2023–present	Incumbent
Diplomatic posts
Preceded by Alexander Downer	Special Adviser to the UN Secretary-General on Cyprus; 2014–2017	Succeeded by Elizabeth Spehar
