= Peacekeeping =

Activities intended to create conditions that favour lasting peace

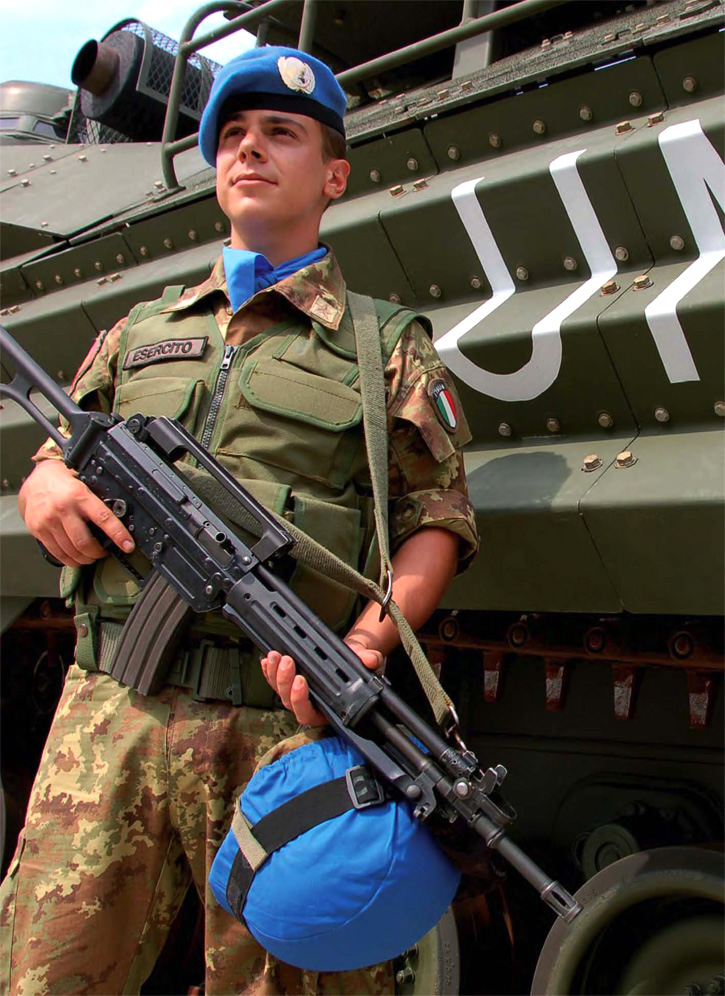
A soldier from the Italian Army stands guard during the UNIFIL mission in Lebanon.

Peacekeeping comprises activities, especially military ones, intended to create conditions that favor lasting peace. Research generally finds that peacekeeping reduces civilian and battlefield deaths, as well as reduces the risk of renewed warfare.

Within the United Nations (UN) group of nation state governments and organizations, there is a general understanding that at the international level, peacekeepers monitor and observe peace processes in post-conflict areas, and may assist ex-combatants in implementing peace agreement commitments that they have undertaken. Such assistance may come in many forms, including confidence-building measures, power-sharing arrangements, electoral support, strengthening the rule of law, and economic and social development. Accordingly, the UN peacekeepers (often referred to as Blue Berets or Blue Helmets because of their light blue berets or helmets) can include soldiers, police officers, and civilian personnel.

The United Nations is not the only organisation to implement peacekeeping missions. Non-UN peacekeeping forces include the NATO mission in Kosovo (with United Nations authorisation) and the Multinational Force and Observers on the Sinai Peninsula or the ones organised by the European Union (like EUFOR RCA, with UN authorisation) and the African Union (like the African Union Mission in Sudan).

Under international law, peacekeepers are non-combatants due to their neutral stance in the conflict between two or more belligerent parties (to the same extent as neutral personnel and properties outside of peacekeeping duties) and are to be protected from attacks at all times.

== Definitions and types of peacekeeping operations ==
=== United Nations peacekeeping missions ===
==== Chapter VI and Chapter VII mission types ====
There is a range of various types of operations encompassed in peacekeeping. In Page Fortna's book Does Peacekeeping Work?, for instance, she distinguishes four different types of peacekeeping operations. Importantly, these types of missions and how they are conducted are heavily influenced by the mandate in which they are authorized. Three of Fortna's four types are consent-based missions, i.e., so-called "Chapter VI" missions, with the fourth being a "Chapter VII" Mission. Chapter VI missions are consent-based; therefore they require the consent of the belligerent factions involved in order to operate. Should they lose that consent, Peacekeepers would be compelled to withdraw. Chapter VII missions, by contrast, do not require consent, though they may have it. If consent is lost at any point, Chapter VII missions would not be required to withdraw.

1. Observation Missions which consist of small contingents of military or civilian observers tasked with monitoring cease-fires, troop withdrawals, or other conditions outlined in a ceasefire agreement. They are typically unarmed and are primarily tasked with observing and reporting on what is taking place. Thus, they do not possess the capability or mandate to intervene should either side renege on the agreement. Examples of observation missions include UNAVEM II in Angola in 1991 and MINURSO in the Western Sahara.
2. Interpositional Missions, also known as traditional peacekeeping, are larger contingents of lightly armed troops meant to serve as a buffer between belligerent factions in the aftermath of a conflict. Thus, they serve as a buffer zone between the two sides and can monitor and report on the compliance of either side with regard to parameters established in a given ceasefire agreement. Examples include UNAVEM III in Angola in 1994, and MINUGUA in Guatemala in 1996.
3. Multidimensional missions are carried out by military and police personnel in which they attempt to implement robust and comprehensive settlements. Not only do they act as observers or in an interpositional role, but they also participate in more multidimensional tasks—such as electoral supervision, police and security forces reform, institution building, economic development, and more. Examples include UNTAG in Namibia, ONUSAL in El Salvador, and ONUMOZ in Mozambique.
4. Peace enforcement Missions are Chapter VII missions and unlike the previous Chapter VI missions, they do not require the consent of the belligerent parties. These are multidimensional operations comprising both civilian and military personnel. The military force is substantial in size and fairly well-equipped by UN Peacekeeping standards. They are mandated to use force for purposes beyond just self-defence. Examples include ECOMOG and UNAMSIL in West Africa and Sierra Leone in 1999, as well as the NATO operations in Bosnia—IFOR and SFOR.

==== UN missions during and after the Cold War ====
During the Cold War, peacekeeping was primarily interpositional in nature—thus being referred to as traditional peacekeeping. UN Peacekeepers were deployed in the aftermath of interstate conflict in order to serve as a buffer between belligerent factions and ensure compliance with the terms of an established peace agreement. Missions were consent-based, and more often than not observers were unarmed—such was the case with UNTSO in the Middle East and UNCIP in India and Pakistan. Others were armed—such as UNEF-I, established during the Suez Crisis. They were largely successful in this role.

In the post-Cold War era, the United Nations has taken on a more nuanced, multidimensional approach to Peacekeeping. In 1992, in the aftermath of the Cold War, then Secretary-General Boutros Boutros-Ghali put together a report detailing his ambitious concepts for the United Nations and Peacekeeping at large. The report, titled An Agenda for Peace, described a multi-faceted and interconnected set of measures he hoped would lead to effective use of the UN in its role in post-Cold War international politics. This included the use of preventative diplomacy, peace-enforcement, peace-making, peace-keeping and post-conflict reconstruction.

==== Broader aims of UN missions ====
In The UN Record on Peacekeeping Operations, Michael Doyle and Nicolas Sambanis summarise Boutros Boutros' report as preventative diplomacy, confidence-building measures such as fact-finding missions, observer mandates, and the potential deployment of UN mandated forces as a preventative measure in order to diminish the potential for violence or the danger of violence occurring and thus increasing the prospect for lasting peace. Their definitions are as follows:

1. Peace-enforcement, meant to act with or without the consent of the belligerents in order to ensure any treaty or cease-fire mandated by the United Nations Security Council is maintained. This is done primarily under the auspices of Chapter VII of the UN Charter and the forces are generally heavily armed as opposed to the unarmed, or lightly armed personnel frequently deployed as observers.
2. Peace-making, meant to compel belligerents to seek a peaceful settlement for their differences via mediation and other forms of negotiation provided by the UN under the auspices of Chapter VI of the UN Charter.
3. Peace-keeping, deployment of a lightly armed United Nations presence in the field with the consent of the belligerents involved in order to build confidence and monitor any agreements between concerned parties. Additionally, diplomats would continue to work toward comprehensive and lasting peace, or for the implementation of an agreed-upon peace.
4. Post-Conflict Reconstruction, intended to develop economic and social cooperation meant to mend relations between the belligerents. Social, political, and economic infrastructure would ideally prevent potential violence and conflict in the future and help to contribute to lasting and robust peace.

Peacekeeping also means working together with NGOs with a view to protecting cultural property. The UN peacekeeping commitment to the protection of cultural heritage dates back to 2012 and is being expanded. An outstanding mission was the deployment of the UN peace mission UNIFIL together with Blue Shield International in 2019 to protect the UNESCO World Heritage in Lebanon. Basically, the protection of cultural property (carried out by military and civil experts in cooperation with local people) forms the stable basis for the future peaceful and economic development of a city, region or country in many conflict areas. Whereby there is also a connection between cultural user disruption and the cause of flight, as President of Blue Shield International Karl von Habsburg explained during the United Nations peacekeeping and UNESCO mission in Lebanon in April 2019: "Cultural assets are part of the identity of the people who live in a certain place. If you destroy their culture, you also destroy their identity. Many people are uprooted, often have no prospects anymore and subsequently flee from their homeland".

=== Non-United Nations peacekeeping ===
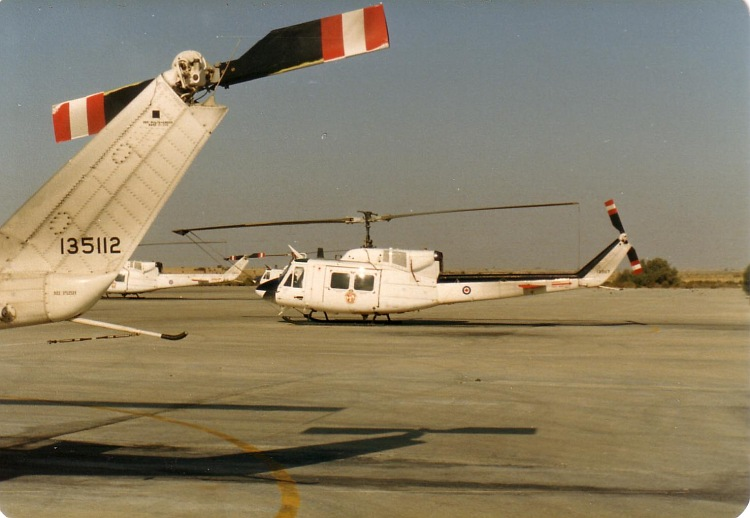
Canadian CH135 Twin Hueys assigned to the Multinational Force and Observers non-UN peacekeeping force, at El Gorah, Sinai, Egypt, 1989

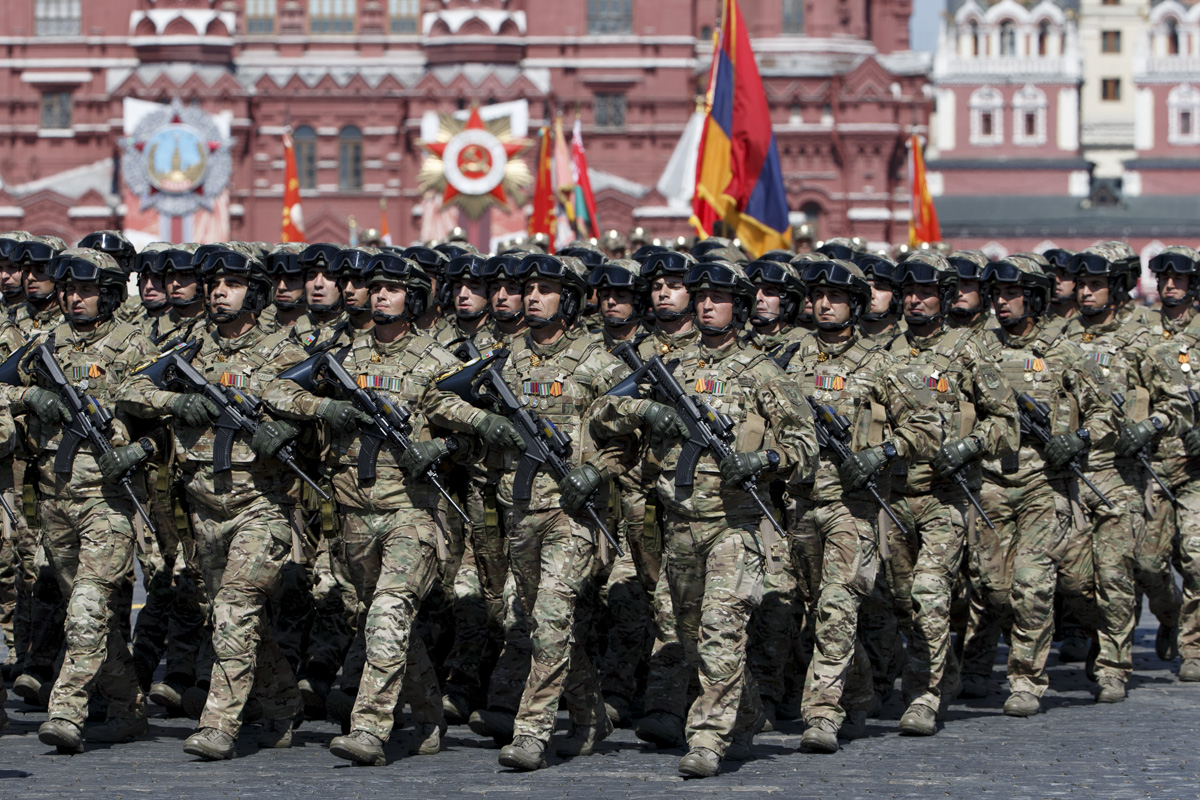
Members of the Azerbaijani peacekeeping forces in full combat uniform during the 2020 Moscow Victory Day Parade

Not all international peacekeeping forces have been directly controlled by the United Nations. In 1981, an agreement between Israel and Egypt formed the Multinational Force and Observers, which continues to monitor the Sinai Peninsula.

The African Union (AU) is working on building an African Peace and Security Architecture that fulfils the mandate to enforce peace and security on the continent. In cases of genocide or other serious human rights violations, an AU-mission could be launched even against the wishes of the government of the country concerned, as long as it is approved by the AU General Assembly. The establishment of the African Peace and Security Architecture (APSA) which includes the African Standby Force (ASF) is planned earliest for 2015. On the regional level, the Economic Community of West African States has initiated several peacekeeping missions in some of its member states, and it has been described as "Africa's most advanced regional peace and security mechanism".

Unarmed Civilian Peacekeeping (UCP) are civilian personnel that carry out non-violent, non-interventionist and impartial set of tactics in order to protect civilians in conflict zones from violence in addition to supporting additional efforts to build a lasting peace. While the term UCP is not entirely ubiquitous among non-governmental agencies (NGOs) in the field: many utilize similar techniques and desire shared outcomes for peace; such as accompaniment, presence, rumour control, community security meetings, the securing of safe passage, and monitoring.

== Brief history ==
=== Creation and early years ===
United Nations Peacekeeping started in 1948 when the United Nations Security Council authorised the deployment of UN unarmed military observers to the Middle East in order to monitor the armistice agreement that was signed between Israel and its Arab neighbours in the wake of the Arab-Israeli War. This operation was called the United Nations Truce Supervision Organization (UNTSO) and is still in operation today. With the passage of resolution 73 (1949) by the Security Council in August 1949, UNTSO was given the task of fulfilling four Armistice Agreements between the state of Israel and the Arab states which had participated in the war. Thus, UNTSO's operations were spread through five states in the region—Israel, Egypt, Jordan, Lebanon and the Syrian Arab Republic.

=== Cold War peacekeeping ===
In the wake of independence in India and Pakistan in August 1947 and the subsequent bloodshed that followed the Security Council adopted resolution 39 (1948) in January 1948 in order to create the United Nations Commission for India and Pakistan (UNCIP), with the purpose of mediating the dispute between India and Pakistan over Kashmir and the fighting related to it. This operation was non-interventionist in nature and was additionally tasked with supervision of a ceasefire signed by Pakistan and India in the state of Jammu and Kashmir. With the passage of the Karachi agreement in July 1949, UNCIP would supervise a ceasefire line that would be mutually overseen by UN unarmed military observers and local commanders from each side in the dispute. UNCIP's mission in the region continues to this day, now under the operational title of the United Nations Military Observer Group in India and Pakistan (UNMOGIP).

Since then, sixty-nine peacekeeping operations have been authorised and have deployed to various countries all over the world. The great majority of these operations have begun in the post-Cold War world. Between 1988 and 1998 thirty-five UN operations had been established and deployed. This signified a substantial increase when compared with the periods between 1948 and 1978; which saw the creation and deployment of only thirteen UN Peacekeeping operations and zero between 1978 and 1988.

Armed intervention first came in the form of UN involvement in the wake of the Suez Crisis in 1956. United Nations Emergency Force (UNEF-1), which existed from November 1956 to June 1967 was essentially the first ever United Nations peacekeeping force. It was given the mandate of ensuring the cessation of hostilities between Egypt, the United Kingdom, France, and Israel in addition to overseeing the withdrawal of French, Israeli and British troops from Egyptian territory. Upon completion of said withdrawal, UNEF would serve as a buffer force between Egyptian and Israeli forces in order to supervise conditions of the ceasefire and contribute to a lasting peace.

Shortly thereafter, the United Nations Operation in the Congo (ONUC), was deployed in 1960. This operation involved upwards of 20,000 military personnel at its peak, and resulted in the death of 250 UN personnel, including then Secretary-General Dag Hammarskjold. ONUC was meant to ensure the withdrawal of Belgian forces in the Congo, who had reinserted themselves after Congolese independence in the wake of a revolt carried out by the Force Publique (FP), in order to protect Belgian citizens and economic interests. ONUC was also tasked with establishing and maintaining law and order (helping to end the FP revolt and ethnic violence) as well as provide technical assistance and training to Congolese security forces. An additional function was added to ONUC's mission, in which the force was tasked with maintaining the territorial integrity and political independence of the Congo—resulting from the secession of the mineral-rich provinces of Katanga and South Kasai. The UN forces there, somewhat controversially, more or less became an arm of the Congolese government at the time and helped to forcefully end the secession of both provinces.

Throughout the 1960s and 1970s the UN created multiple short-term missions all over the world including the Mission of the Representative of the Secretary-General in the Dominican Republic (DOMREP), the UN Security Force in West New Guinea (UNSF), the UN Yemen Observation Mission (UNYOM), in conjunction with more long-term operations such as the UN Peacekeeping Force in Cyprus (UNFICYP), the UN Emergency Force II (UNEF II), the UN Disengagement Observer Force (UNDOF) and the United Nations Interim Force in Lebanon (UNIFIL).

United Nations peacekeeping missions as of 2012

=== Since 1991 ===
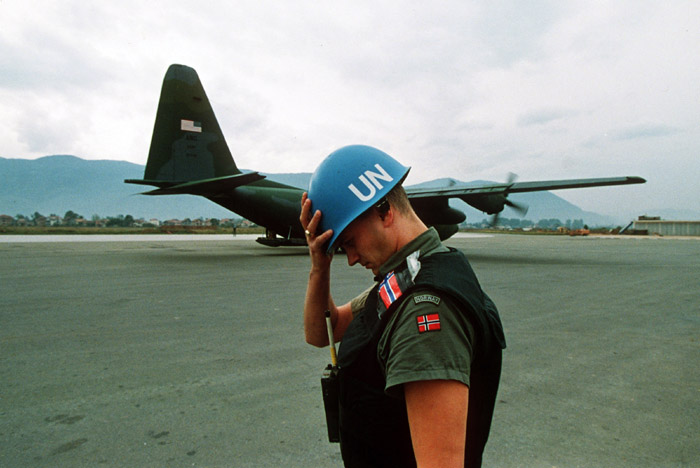
Norwegian Peacekeeper during the Siege of Sarajevo (1992–1993), photo by Mikhail Evstafiev

Experiences of peacekeeping during the Yugoslav Wars, especially failures such as the Srebrenica Massacre, led, in part, to the United Nations Peacebuilding Commission, which works to implement stable peace through some of the same civic functions that peacekeepers also work on, such as elections. The Commission currently works with six countries, all in Africa. In 2013 the U.N. Security Council unanimously passed Resolution 2122, which among other things calls for stronger measures regarding women's participation in conflict and post-conflict processes such as peace talks, gender expertise in peacekeeping missions, improved information about the impact of armed conflict on women, and more direct briefing to the Council on progress in these areas. Also in 2013, the Committee on the Elimination of Discrimination against Women (CEDAW), a UN women's rights committee, said in a general recommendation that states that have ratified the UN Women's Rights Convention are obliged to uphold women's rights before, during, and after conflict when they are directly involved in fighting, and/or are providing peacekeeping troops or donor assistance for conflict prevention, humanitarian aid or post-conflict reconstruction.

The Committee also stated that ratifying states should exercise due diligence in ensuring that non-state actors, such as armed groups and private security contractors, be held accountable for crimes against women.

One of the findings of Page Fortna about where peacekeepers go is that "peacekeeping is a matter of supply and demand" From the supply side, she observes that there is unlikely a Peacekeeping mission in civil wars on countries close to one of the members of the Security Council. From the demand side, there is diverse evidence that peacekeeping missions are deployed in the countries who need it the most, this is where the risk of a recurring war is high.

== Composition of peacekeeping forces ==
=== Nations that participate in peacekeeping missions ===
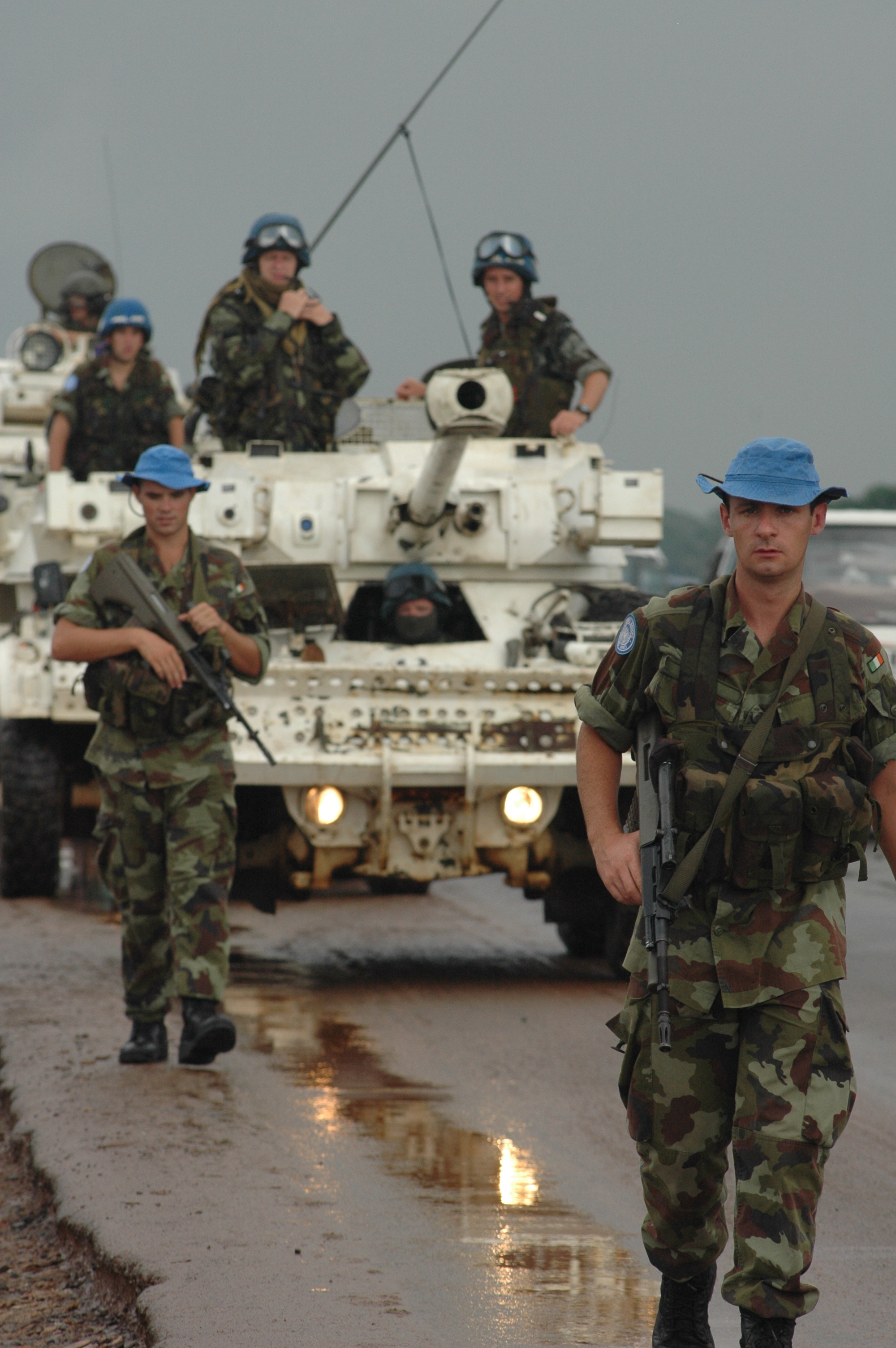
Irish UNMIL troops on patrol in Liberia, July 2006

The United Nations Charter stipulates that to assist in maintaining peace and security around the world, all member states of the UN should make available to the Security Council necessary armed forces and facilities. Since 1948, about 130 nations have contributed military and civilian police personnel to peace operations. While detailed records of all personnel who have served in peacekeeping missions since 1948 are not available, it is estimated that up to one million soldiers, police officers and civilians have served under the UN flag on its 71 missions. As of September 2021, 122 countries were contributing a total of around 76,000 military observers, police, and troops.

Despite the large number of contributors, the greatest burden continues to be borne by a core group of developing countries. The ten largest troop contributing countries (including police and military experts) to UN peacekeeping operations as of October 2021 were Bangladesh (6447), Nepal (5536), India (5481), Rwanda (5263), Ethiopia (4856), Pakistan (3949), Egypt (2818), Indonesia (2818), Ghana (2296), and China (2248). More than 14,000 civilian personnel serve in peacekeeping operations as legal or medical experts, educators, communication technology professionals, or administrators as of October 2021.

As of September 30, 2021, 4147 people from over 100 countries have been killed while serving on peacekeeping missions. India has the highest number of peacekeeper casualties with 174, followed by Bangladesh (159), Pakistan (159), Nigeria (157), Ghana (145), Ethiopia (138), Canada (123), France (115) and the United Kingdom (106). Since 1948, 56 peacekeepers have been killed each year on average, but recent decades have seen this number almost double, with 110 deaths per year since 2001. 30% of the fatalities in the first 55 years of UN peacekeeping occurred between 1993 and 1995.

There is a strong North-South divide in peacekeeping in that developing nations from the Global South provide the overwhelming majority of peacekeepers. Thomas G. Weiss and Giovanna Kuele argue that this is due to three factors: regional interests, prestige, and financial benefits. African countries are the largest contributors of peacekeepers, but the continent also has the highest number of peacekeeping missions, and most African peacekeepers serve on African missions. As an example, almost all 4800 Ethiopian peacekeepers are deployed in its neighboring countries of Sudan and South Sudan. Being a contributor to peacekeeping missions also provides some international prestige for developing countries, and can bolster countries' claims to be a great power as in the case of Brazil and India. Lastly, providing peacekeepers can have financial benefits for poorer countries. The monthly rate of reimbursement per peacekeeper includes $1,028 for pay and allowances; $303 supplementary pay for specialists; $68 for personal clothing, gear and equipment; and $5 for personal weaponry. Both the direct payments and the training and equipment provided by UN peacekeeping missions can be financially attractive to individual soldiers and developing nations. About 4.5% of the troops and civilian police deployed in UN peacekeeping missions come from the European Union and less than one percent from the United States.

With regard to mission leadership, Force Commanders often come from large troop contributors, while the Special Representatives of the Secretary General often come from developed countries.

=== Women's participation in peacekeeping ===
Security Council Resolution 1325 was the first major step taken by the UN to include women as active and equal actors in "the prevention and resolution of conflicts, peace negotiations, peace-building, peacekeeping, humanitarian response and in post-conflict reconstruction and stresses the importance of their equal participation and full involvement in all efforts for the maintenance and promotion of peace and security". A critique of this resolution is that UNSCR 1325 proposes the implementing gender mainstreaming, however the progress that has been accomplished in this area has focused on women, rather than on assessing the impacts of planned action on both men and women. In 2010, a comprehensive 10-year impact study was conducted to assess the success of this resolution and found that there was limited success with the implementation, particularly in the increasing women's participation in peace negotiations and peace agreements, and sexual and gender-based violence has continued to be prevalent, despite efforts to reduce it.

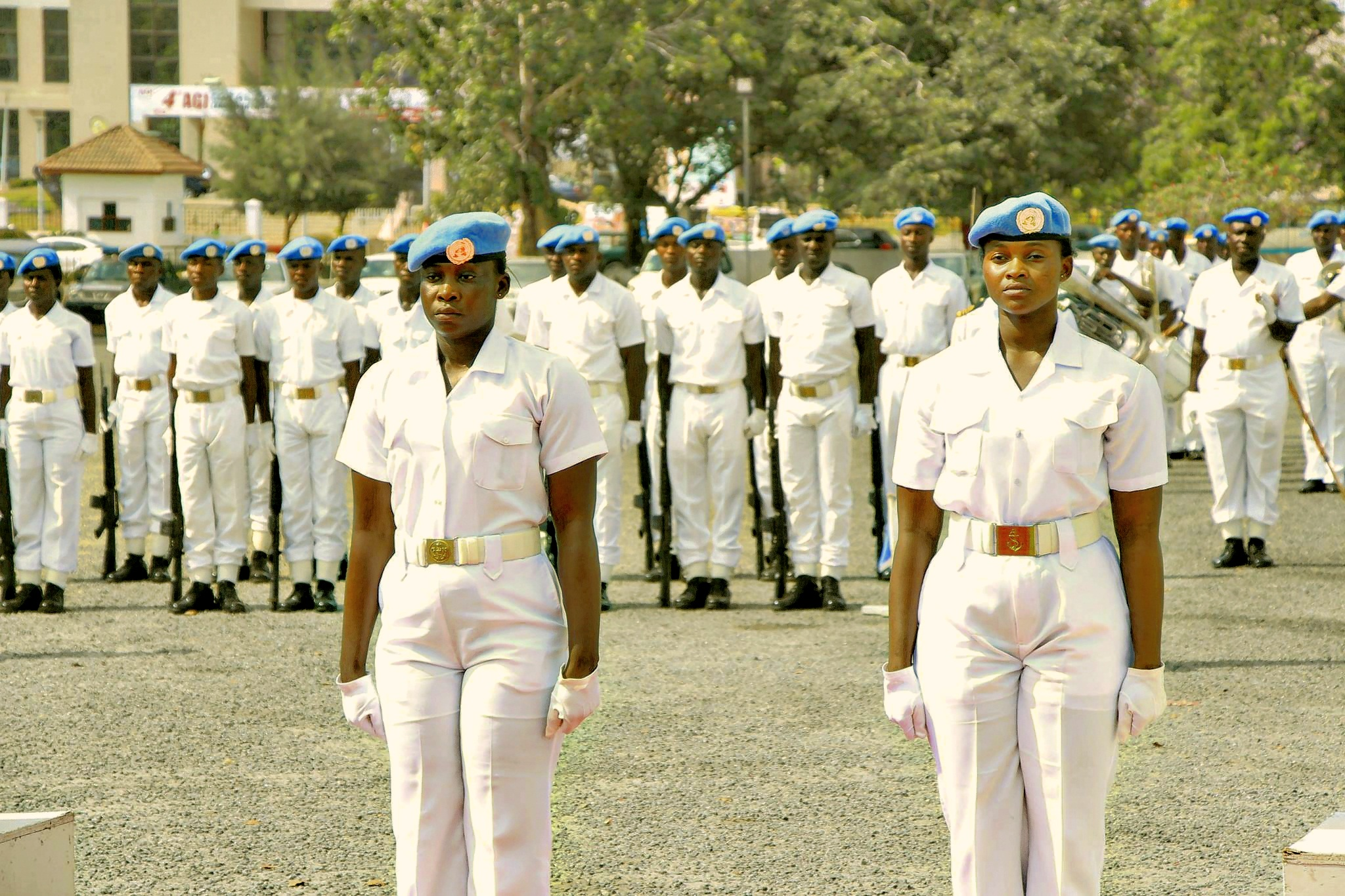
Ghanaian women serve as UN Peacekeepers.

In 2013 the U.N. Security Council unanimously passed Resolution 2122, which among other things calls for stronger measures regarding women's participation in conflict and post-conflict processes such as peace talks, gender expertise in peacekeeping missions, improved information about the impact of armed conflict on women, and more direct briefing to the Council on progress in these areas. Also in 2013, the Committee on the Elimination of Discrimination against Women (CEDAW), a UN women's rights committee, said in a general recommendation that states that have ratified the UN Women's Rights Convention are obliged to uphold women's rights before, during, and after conflict when they are directly involved in fighting, and/or are providing peacekeeping troops or donor assistance for conflict prevention, humanitarian aid or post-conflict reconstruction The Committee also stated that ratifying states should exercise due diligence in ensuring that non-state actors, such as armed groups and private security contractors, be held accountable for crimes against women.

As of July 2016, women serve in every UN peacekeeping mission either as troops, police, or civilian staff. In 1993, women made up 1% of deployed uniformed personnel. In 2020, out of approximately 95,000 peacekeepers, women constituted 4.8% of military personnel, 10.9% of police personnel, and 34% of justice and corrections personnel in UN peacekeeping missions. As of September 2021, no state contributing more than 100 UN peacekeepers nominates more than 25% women; in absolute numbers, the largest female contingents are provided by Ethiopia (578 female peacekeepers, or 12% of its total forces), Rwanda (500/10%), and Ghana (389/17%). While there is no set target for the proportion of women among military personnel, the UN is requesting contributing states to nominate a minimum of 20% women for policer officer positions and 30% for justice and corrections personnel. In 2024, the number of women in the military personnel of UN peace operations decreased, while their proportion increased. The proportional increase has continued since the launch of the Uniformed Gender Parity Strategy. The decline in absolute numbers can be traced back to the closure of MINUSMA. In June 2024, women constituted 8.6% of the total military personnel deployed in UN peace operations, which was an increase of 1.3% compared with the previous year.

== Theoretical basis for peacekeeping ==
While much has been written about peacekeeping and what peacekeepers do, very little empirical research has taken place in order to identify the manner in which peacekeepers can have an impact in a post-conflict environment. Columbia University Professor Virginia Page Fortna attempted to categorize four causal mechanisms through which peacekeepers have the opportunity to lay the groundwork for a lasting peace. Fortna's four mechanisms are as follows:

1. Change the incentives of recent belligerents, making peace more desirable or war more costly.
2. Reduce the uncertainty and fear that drives security dilemma spirals.
3. Prevent or control accidents or the actions of rogue groups that might otherwise escalate back to war.
4. Prevent political abuse by one side (generally the government) that might cause actors losing the peace to take up arms anew.

Fortna argues that peacekeepers have a positive impact on the peace process, despite often being sent to places where peace is most difficult to achieve. Peacekeeping is often looked at by detractors as ineffective, or unnecessary. Peace prevails when belligerents already have a vested interest in sustaining peace and therefore it could be argued that Peacekeepers play only a minor role in creating a strong foundation for enduring peace. Yet these causal reasons illustrate the important roles that Peacekeepers play in ensuring that peace lasts, especially when contrasted against situations in which belligerents are left to their own devices. These causal reasons thus illustrate the need for Peacekeeping and lay a foundation for the manner in which Peacekeeping operations can have a substantive impact on the post-conflict environment.

In order to change the incentives for war and make peace more appealing the UN can provide a military force by way of an enforcement mandate which provides deterrence to would-be spoilers. They can monitor the situation making the potential for surprise attack by one of the belligerents less likely to occur or by making it more difficult to carry out such an attack. A lightly armed observer mission can also serve as an early-warning force or "tripwire" for the aforementioned enforcement mission. Aid and recognition provided to the belligerents by the international community should be made conditional and based on compliance with objectives laid out in the negotiating process. And lastly, peace dividends should be provided in the forms of jobs, public works and other benefits.

To reduce uncertainty and fear the UN Peacekeeping force can monitor the aforementioned compliance, facilitate communication between belligerents in order to ease security dilemma concerns thus reassuring belligerents that the other side will not renege, and allow for belligerents to signal their legitimate intentions for peace to the other side. That is to say, provide a meaningful pathway for communication between both sides to make their intentions known and credible.

Prevention and control of potential accidents that may derail the peace process can be achieved by the peacekeeping force by deterring rogue groups. Belligerent forces are often undisciplined without a strong central source of command and control, therefore while a peace is being negotiated there is potential for a rogue group on one side to renege and spoil the peace process. UN forces can serve to prevent this. Additionally, the UN force can serve as a moderator and make communication easy between both parties and bring in political moderates from either side. By providing law and order UN peacekeeping forces can temporarily replace a state's security forces and prevent a bias overreaction to an alleged violation by one side which could in turn result in escalation and a renewal in the violence.

Prevention of political abuse can be achieved through the reformation of institutions associated with the government. Training and monitoring the security forces (e.g. army or police) help to make them an unbiased protector of the people rather than a weapon of suppression for the ruling government. Hopefully this training can bring trust by the people for the security establishment. UN forces can also run and monitor elections in order to ensure a fair process. In other cases, the UN may provide a neutral interim government to administer the country during a transitional period wherein the associated government institutions are being retrained, reformed or better developed. Lastly, military groups such as armed rebels can be encouraged to put down their weapons and transformed into political organisations using appropriate non-violent means to mete out their grievances and compete in the election cycle. This is especially important as many of these groups serve as the chief opposition to a given government, but lack the means or know-how to operate effectively as political organisations.

Different peacekeeping missions take place as a result of different causal mechanisms. More military deterrence and enforcement are meant for those missions operating under the auspices of Chapter VII, while Chapter VI missions are meant to serve more as monitoring forces and interpositional operations are meant to target and prevent potential political abuse—these are primarily multidimensional missions and are heavily involved in the post-conflict political situation.

== Effectiveness of peacekeeping missions ==
Reviews of the academic literature show considerable evidence that peacekeeping increases peace. According to Fortna, there is strong evidence that the presence of peacekeepers significantly reduces the risk of renewed warfare; more peacekeeping troops contribute to fewer battlefield deaths; and more peacekeeping troops contribute to fewer civilian deaths. A study by political scientists at Uppsala University and Peace Research Institute Oslo estimates that an ambitious UN peacekeeping policy with a doubled peacekeeping operation and strong mandates would "reduce the global incidence of armed conflict by two thirds relative to a no-PKO scenario." According to Fordham University political scientist Anjali Dayal, "Scholars have found that peacekeeping keeps wars from bleeding across borders. Having more peacekeepers on the ground also seems to correspond with fewer civilians targeted with violence. And peace operations at times have successfully served as transitional authorities, handing power back to local authorities, although this is decreasingly true." A 2018 study found that peacekeeping reduces the severity of civil war on its own, but when it is coupled with mediation, the impact is greater. There is also evidence that the promise to deploy peacekeepers can help international organizations bring combatants to the negotiation table and increase the likelihood that they will agree to a cease-fire.

By controlling for specific factors that affect where peacekeepers are deployed and what the potential chances for peace are, Page Fortna's statistical research shows that there is a statistically significant impact on lasting peace when peacekeepers are deployed. Despite the fact that peacekeepers are sent to locations where peace is least likely to succeed, Fortna finds that conservative estimates suggest that the presence of UN peacekeepers diminishes the risk for renewed violence by at least 55%-60%; with less conservative estimates upwards of 75%-85%. Additionally, her analysis concludes that there is little difference in the effectiveness between Chapter VI consent-based missions and Chapter VII enforcement missions. Indeed, enforcement missions only remain effective if the UN peacekeeping force can prove and sustain their credibility in the use of force. This stresses the importance of a UN mission maintaining the consent of the peacekept. Ultimately, Fortna finds that peacekeeping is an effective tool for ensuring a lasting peace; especially compared to situations in which belligerents' are left to their own devices. Utilising the previously mentioned causal mechanisms for peacekeeping, a UN peacekeeping force can have a substantial and substantive impact on sustaining a lasting peace. Having a relative consensus of the positive impact of peacekeeping for ensuring a lasting peace, Fortna and Howard suggest that the literature is moving towards the study of i) the effectiveness of the types of peace-keepers, ii) the transitional administrations, iii) the links between peacekeeping and democratisation, and iv) the perspectives of the "peacekept".

Doyle and Sambanis' analysis finds that lasting peace is more likely after non-ethnic wars in countries with a relatively high level of development in addition to whether or not UN peacekeeping forces and financial assistance are available. They conclude that in the short run lasting peace is more dependent on a robust UN deployment coupled with low levels of hostility between belligerents. They note that increased economic capacity can provide an incentive not to renew hostilities. In the long run, however, economic capacity matters far more whereas the degree of hostility between belligerents is less important. As successful as UN deployments can be, they have inadequately spurred independent economic development within the countries where they have intervened. Thus, the UN plays a strong, but indirect role and success in lasting peace is predicated on the development of institutions that support peace, rather than serving as a deterrent for renewed war.

Other scholarly analyses show varying success rates for peacekeeping missions, with estimate ranging from 31 percent to 85 percent.

According to a 2020 study, non-UN peacekeeping missions are as effective as UN peacekeeping missions. Another 2020 study found that peacekeeping successfully protected civilians.

A 2021 study in the American Journal of Political Science found that UN peacekeeping in South Sudan had a positive impact on the local economy.

=== Factors that impact lasting peace ===
There are many factors that can have a negative impact on lasting peace such as hidden information about the relative strength possessed by the belligerents; a rebel group's involvement in illicit financing through means such as through the export of diamonds and other minerals; participation in the trafficking of drugs, weapons and human beings; whether or not military victory was achieved by one side; the length of the war as well as how costly it was; commitment problems and security dilemma spirals experienced by both sides; whether a cease-fire or treaty signed by the belligerents; lack of transparency in the motives and actions carried out by belligerents in the immediate aftermath of the conflict; extremist spoilers; participants in the conflict that may benefit from its continuation; indivisibility and more.

Perhaps one of the most statistically significant contributors to a lasting peace is whether or not military victory was achieved by one side. According to Fortna's research, civil wars in which one side wins, resulting in a cease-fire or truce, have an approximately 85–90% lower chance of renewed war. Moreover, peace treaties further reduce the risk by 60–70%.

If a group is funded by drugs, diamonds or other illicit trade then there is a substantial increase in the chance of renewed violence—100–250%—which is to say that in such circumstances war is two to three-and-a-half times more likely to begin again. While Fortna finds that wars which involve many factions are less likely to resume, Doyle and Sambanis find the opposite.

Costly wars and wars fought along identity lines both provide varied chances of the renewal of violence. While longer wars and peace established by treaty (especially those attained by military victory) can reduce the chances of another war.

== Impacts of peacekeeping on participating forces ==
=== Military normalisation ===
Some commentators have highlighted the potential to leverage peacekeeping operations as a mechanism for advancing military normalisation. Michael Edward Walsh and Jeremy Taylor have argued that Japan's peacekeeping operations in South Sudan provide those promoting Japan's military normalisation with "a unique opportunity to further erode the country's pacifist constitution." "Unable to accept the full weight of modern peacekeeping operations without fundamental political, legal, and social changes," they conclude that "Japan's peacekeepers remain ill-prepared to tackle many serious contingencies requiring use of deadly force." For this reason, they suggest that Japan's continued participation in UN peacekeeping operations might force policy changes that ultimately push the country toward "a tipping point from which the normalisation of Japan's military (will be) the only outcome."

=== Political impact on sending countries ===
Diana Muir Appelbaum has expressed concern that the creation of a military in Fiji for the purpose of serving in international peacekeeping missions, has produced a military powerful enough to stage four coups d'état (1987, 1999–2000, 2006, and 2009) and to rule Fiji as a military dictatorship for over two decades. However, a 2018 study published in the Journal of Peace Research found that countries where militaries are highly dependent on the funds they receive from UN peacekeeping were less likely to experience coups d'états than comparable countries less dependent on such funds.

=== Impacts on individual peacekeepers ===
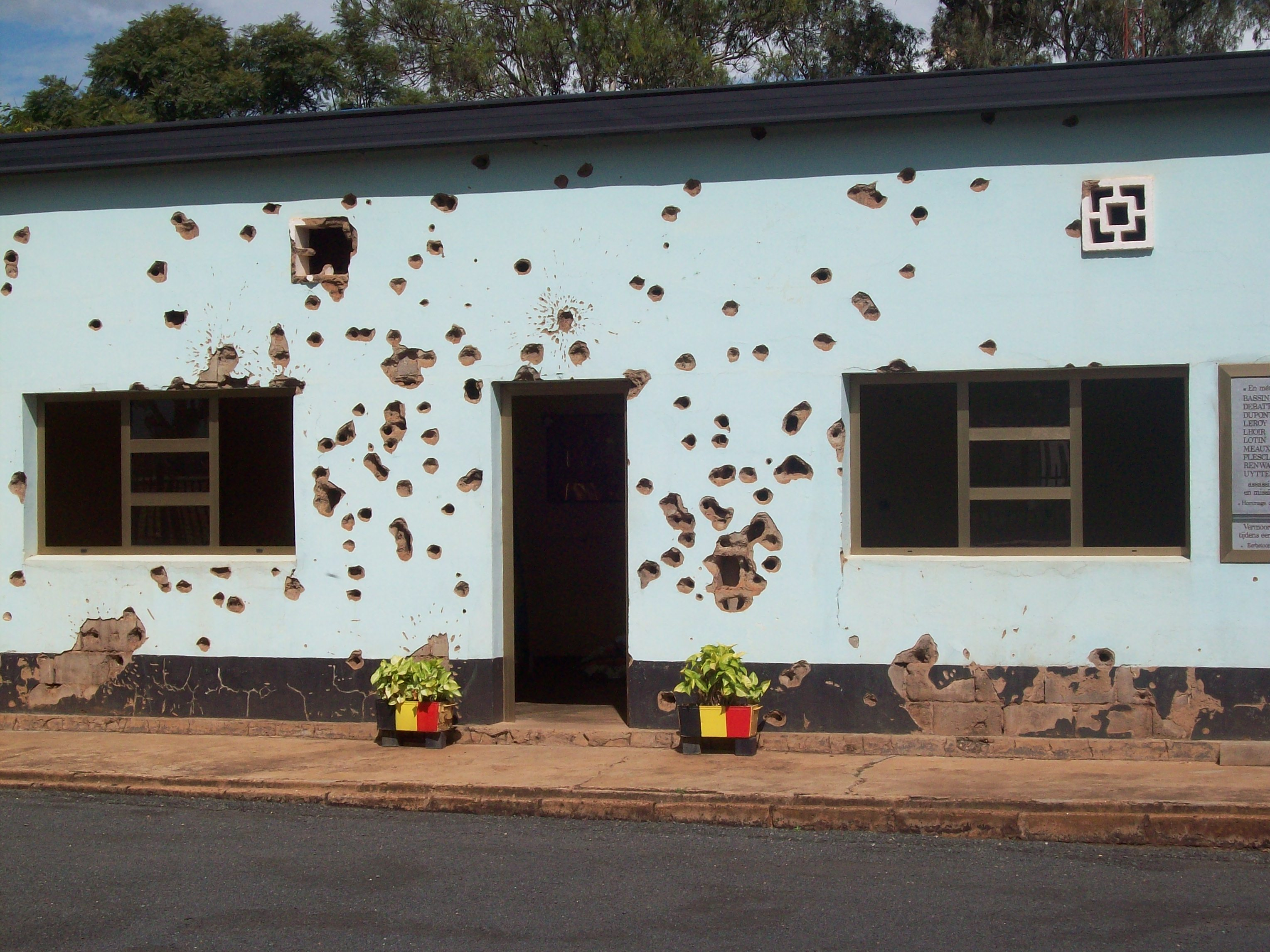
Memorial in Kigali, Rwanda, to ten Belgian peacekeepers of UNAMIR who were massacred by Hutu paramilitaries in 1994

Studies of peacekeeping soldiers show both positive and negative effects. A study of 951 US Army soldiers assigned to Bosnia revealed that 77% reported some positive consequences, 63% reported a negative consequence, and 47% reported both. The peacekeepers are exposed to danger caused by the warring parties and often in an unfamiliar climate. This gives rise to different mental health problems, suicide, and substance abuse as shown by the percentage of former peacekeepers with those problems. Having a parent in a mission abroad for an extended period is also stressful to the peacekeepers' families.

Another viewpoint raises the problem that the peacekeeping may soften the troops and erode their combat ability, as the mission profile of a peacekeeping contingent is totally different from the profile of a unit fighting an all-out war.

== Criticism ==
=== Peacekeeping, human trafficking, and forced prostitution ===
Since the 1990s, UN peacekeepers have been the subject of numerous accusations of abuse ranging from rape and sexual assault, to pedophilia and human trafficking. Complaints have arisen from Cambodia, East Timor and West Africa. In Bosnia-Herzegovina prostitution associated with trafficked women skyrocketed and often operated just beyond the gates of U.N. compounds. David Lamb, a regional human rights officer in Bosnia from 2000 to 2001 claimed "The sex slave trade in Bosnia largely exists because of the U.N. peacekeeping operation. Without the peacekeeping presence, there would have been little or no forced prostitution in Bosnia." In addition, hearing held by the U.S. House of Representatives in 2002 found that members of SFOR were frequenting Bosnian brothels and engaging in sex with trafficked women and underage girls.

Reporters witnessed a rapid increase in prostitution in Cambodia, Mozambique, Bosnia, and Kosovo after UN and, in the case of the latter two, NATO peacekeeping forces moved in. In the 1996 UN study called "The Impact of Armed Conflict on Children", former first lady of Mozambique Graça Machel documented: "In 6 out of 12 country studies on sexual exploitation of children in situations of armed conflict prepared for the present report, the arrival of peacekeeping troops has been associated with a rapid rise in child prostitution".

Gita Sahgal spoke out in 2004 with regard to the fact that prostitution and sex abuse crops up wherever humanitarian intervention efforts are set up. She observed that the "issue with the UN is that peacekeeping operations unfortunately seem to be doing the same thing that other militaries do. Even the guardians have to be guarded".

An investigation by Prince Zeid Ra'ad Zeid Al-Hussein, then Permanent Representative of Jordan to the United Nations, in 2006 resulted in a comprehensive report which detailed some of this abuse in detail— particularly that which occurred in the Democratic Republic of Congo. Sexual exploitation frequently came in the form of prostitution, wherein some money (an average of $1-$3 per encounter) was exchanged for sex. In other instances food, or jobs were utilized to ply women for sex. Other young women reported of "rape disguised as prostitution", whereabouts peacekeepers would rape them and were then given some money or food in order to make the act seem consensual. Between May and September 2004, there were seventy-two allegations of sexual exploitation—68 against military and 4 against civilian personnel. By the end of 2004 there would be a total of 105 allegations. The majority of these allegations were in regards to sex with person under the age of 18 years (45 percent) and sex with adult prostitutes (31 percent). Rape and sexual assault made up approximately 13 and 5 percent respectively, with the remaining 6 percent of allegations relating to other forms of sexual exploitation. Most of the allegations were against peacekeepers from Pakistan, Uruguay, Morocco, Tunisia, South Africa, and Nepal.

Uruguayan President Jose Mujica apologized to Haitian President Michel Martelly over the alleged rape of an 18-year-old Haitian man by Uruguayan UN peacekeeping troops. Martelly said "a collective rape carried out against a young Haitian" would not go unpunished. Four soldiers suspected of being involved in the rape have been detained.

In July 2007 the United Nations Department of Peacekeeping Operations (DPKO) confined an entire contingent of 734 Moroccans in the Ivory Coast in the wake of allegations that some had sexually abused underage girls. In the following years, there were 80 investigations carried out by the UN Office of Internal Oversight Services (OIOS). In 2013, allegations were levelled on personnel from France, Gabon, and Burundi operating in the Central African Republic. These include accusations of sexual abuse and exploitation of at least 108 from Kemo Prefecture and that the vast majority of the cases involved minors. In 2016, more allegations of abuse were levelled on Peacekeepers operating in the Democratic Republic of Congo's eastern province of North Kivu. Tanzania and the UN opened a joint inquiry into the alleged abuse, which involved Tanzanian troops. There have been 18 reports of sexual abuse, eight of which involved minors. Sixteen Tanzanian soldiers, a Malawian and a South African are implicated in the accusations. The UN reported in March 2016 that there was a large increase in allegations; which involved troops from twenty-one countries. Most of the allegations involved troops from African countries including: Cameroon, Congo, Tanzania, Benin, Burkina Faso, Burundi, Ghana, Madagascar, Niger, Nigeria, Rwanda, Senegal and Togo.

=== Peacekeepers and the Haiti cholera crisis ===
External videos
- Sexual misconduct by Canadian police officers sent to help in Haiti- CBC News

Significant scientific evidence, first reported by the Associated Press, and later the New York Times, Al Jazeera, and ABC News has shown that Nepalese peacekeeping troops stationed at a remote base in Mirebalais, Haiti, triggered a deadly cholera epidemic that has ravaged the country since October 2010. Cholera is a waterborne disease that causes diarrhoea and vomiting, and it can kill in a matter of hours if patients do not receive rehydration intervention. As of July 2012, Haiti's cholera epidemic was the worst in the world: about 7,500 had died and about 585,000 Haitians (about 1 in every 20 Haitians) had become ill with the disease.

According to the UN-appointed Independent Panel of Experts on the Cholera Outbreak in Haiti, the conditions at the peacekeeping base were unsafe, and allowed contamination of Haiti's river systems in at least two ways: "The construction of the water pipes in the main toilet/showering area [was] haphazard, with significant potential for cross-contamination...especially from pipes that run over an open drainage ditch that runs throughout the camp and flows directly into the Meye Tributary System". Additionally, the panel reported that on a regular basis black water waste from the Mirebalais base and two other bases was deposited in an open, unfenced septic pit that was susceptible to flooding and would overflow into the Meye Tributary during rainfall.

In November 2011, over 5,000 victims of the cholera epidemic filed a claim with the UN's internal claims mechanism seeking redress in the form of clean water and sanitation infrastructure necessary to control the epidemic, compensation for individual losses, and an apology. In July 2012, 104 members of the United States Congress signed a letter affirming that the "actions of the UN" had brought cholera to Haiti and that the UN should "confront and ultimately eliminate cholera". In 2013 the UN rejected the claim and the victims' lawyers have pledged to sue the UN in court.

=== Cultural concerns related to contemporary peacekeeping ===
There is a notable intermingling of varied cultures when it comes to peacekeeping. From the vast number of troops, police and personnel that are brought together from various contributing countries to the oftentimes challenging ethnic regions which peacekeeping forces are often deployed. Because of these varied cultures, complicated cultural interactions take place which not only affect mission effectiveness, but can also lead to friction with the population the peacekeepers are meant to be assisting.

In most cases prior to 1988, specific countries often provided peacekeepers. At that point, only twenty-six countries had sent personnel to participate in peacekeeping deployments. Today, that number has risen to more than eighty. This results in an extremely heterogeneous group. Thus, UN Peacekeeping deployments must not only contend with language complications, but also myriad cultural and social differences that can create operational difficulties that are hard to overcome. These differences can create problems with regard to interactions (whether personal or between institutions/units), misunderstandings, inadvertent offensive behaviour and prejudices that may be associated with a particular contingent from a given country.

In terms of operations, effectiveness can be hindered by the varying tactics, techniques and procedures employed by the military or police personnel that are a part of a given deployment. Because UN forces are cobbled together from so many different sources, there is a discrepancy in capabilities, training, equipment, standards and procedures. Moreover, substantial differences exist in the form of command and control between contributing members personnel. In addition, some nations may not wish to be subordinated to another, complicating unity of command. This can lead to deep-seated divisions between contingents within the UN force that results in a lack of mutual support between units in the field. This can be demonstrated in the experiences of UN peacekeeping forces deployed to East Timor, where the Australians engaged in a robust operation that maximised force protection in contrast to a pro-active heart and minds approach utilised by Great Britain's Ghurka personnel.

Maintaining the consent of the peacekept is an important facet of modern peacekeeping. Notably in Bosnia, in Somalia and in Rwanda, fundamental principles of retaining that consent was ignored on the grounds of a humanitarian intervention—reflecting the nature of an Article VII intervention. Yet in order to stress and maintain the legitimacy of an intervention it is important that the UN's forces continue to enjoy the consent of the population and government of the country to which they were deployed. This means making the peacekept feel a part of the process in addition to important cultural knowledge of the area in which peacekeepers are operating, in order to reduce friction and provide for a successful operation.

There has been little study on the interaction of cultures that exist within a peacekeeping force and the population within which they operate. However, in 1976 Johan Galtung and Helge Hveem studied Norwegian personnel who participated in UNEF-1 (in Gaza) and ONUC (Congo). They posited that knowledge of the culture and an understanding of the inhabitants in a given country were not only necessary, but crucial for the success of the mission. They found that personnel from the Norwegian contingent wanted greater insight into the conflict and the culture in which they operated. They also wanted more robust training with regard to working with people from other countries. Yet the study revealed the troops received very little from briefings and that the majority of the information regarding the conflict was gained through the news, reading books or speaking with other UN personnel — rather than any established UN training program.

Similarly, a study conducted on the relations between members of UNIFIL and local population in Lebanon, carried out by Heiberg and Holst, all but confirmed the findings. In their example, they found that the countries that were able to integrate more fully with the population and show a depth of knowledge about the local culture were more successful, while those that were ambitious, but less integrated into the local scene found themselves far removed from the individuals with which they were supposed to be engaged and their success, or lack thereof, illustrated this.

Only the Italian contingent of some 2,200 people operated as part of the local environment and became an active element in restoring normal living conditions. Its soldiers were provided with the training required to acquaint them with the cultural, political and social situation of the people among whom they worked. Operating in a sector that contained approximately 600,000 inhabitants, mostly Shi'ites, the Italians carefully nurtured contact with the ordinary citizens and the political leaders in their area... While the Americans thought they were becoming involved in Lebanese politics, they entered into Lebanese culture and history with little or no understanding of the way things worked—or didn't work... Most Americans did not understand the subtleties of short-term alliances, the length of memories and blood feuds, the strength of aln [kin] in Arab culture nor the nuances of religious differences.

This illustrates the importance of understanding the significance that culture plays in the conduct of successful peacekeeping operations. However, despite the existence of a UN training manual that attempts to advise peacekeepers on necessary techniques, there is no unifying doctrine, or standardised procedure among peacekeeping contingents, which will ultimately hinder the potential for success.

=== Limitations on contemporary intervention and conflict resolution ===
Throughout the duration of the Cold War external intervention and mediation in civil conflicts took on a state-centric mechanism in which sovereignty was inviolable. Rarely did the international community intervene in internal conflicts involving a state's government and domestic belligerents that opposed it. Since the end of the Cold War, however, that has changed. Today, mediation by international actors in civil conflict rest on a standardised resolution mechanism that accords broadly equal standing to all factions within a conflict, and attempts to reach a settlement accepted by all.

The end of the Cold War presented an opportunity to reshape the international system. This opportunity was afforded to the Cold War's victors—that is to say, the United States and other western capitalist states governed by liberal-democratic values that put a premium on basic human rights and democratization. In the preceding decades the state was the only entity to receive special status. While there were exceptions, such as groups struggling against colonial powers, the state possessed the ultimate degree of legitimacy. As a result, the international community rarely meddled with the internal machinations of a given country. Sovereignty was not to be violated and this was a system which benefited both superpowers, their allies, as well as third world governments.

Now, however, with legitimacy being extended to non-state actors, as well as the opportunity for a minority to secede from a given state and form a new country there has been a dramatic shift in the international status quo. Moreover, the international community's model for conflict resolution is heavily influenced by academic thought developed in western countries. This model encourages intervening in civil wars in order to stop political violence and come to a negotiated settlement which often involves democratising efforts. Critics such as Christopher Clapham and David Shearer, argue that this intervention can provide mechanisms for continued conflict to the detriment of the civilian population. Clapham's argument is principally in relation to the situation in Rwanda leading up to the genocide, whereas Shearer focuses on the negative aspects of intervention, primarily regarding Sierra Leone, which prevents total victory by one side and results in the creation of asymmetries between belligerents which opens the door for continued bloodshed.

In Rwanda, third-party attempts at a negotiated settlement between the Hutu and Tutsi afforded an opportunity for Hutu extremists to prepare for the killing of Hutu moderates and the genocide of the Tutsi. The international community, led by regional states from the Organisation of African Unity, sought to negotiate a settlement and find a solution for the ongoing ethnic violence between Hutu and Tutsi via the Arusha Peace Process. This process lasted just over a year, included substantial international involvement, and incorporated many regional actors such as Tanzania (host of the process), Burundi, Uganda and Zaire. While the Rwandan Patriotic Front (RPF) was a major beneficiary of the Arusha accords and was able to redress many of its grievances, many of the gains that it made could have been achieved through military action. Arusha accords, according to Clapham, affected the relative power of the participants in the two following ways: a ceasefire which froze the distribution of territorial control at a particular point and secondly the importance it ascribed to the participants of the negotiations. Meaning that it froze the conflict and prevented continued territorial gains being made by the RPF, in addition to designating the degree of importance with regard to the factions within the negotiations. A faction's importance was weighted not on their relative popularity or military strength, but on artificial weight assigned by the mediators. Thus, the entire process served to undermine the RPF's position while stalling their hitherto successful military campaign, while allowing Hutu extremists to prepare for the Rwandan genocide.

Shearer argues that modern strategies that rely solely on consent-based negotiations are severely limited and that victory by military means should not be ignored. He states that a shift in battlefield fortunes can often bring one belligerent to the negotiation table and will likewise moderate their demands.

Consent is of great importance when it comes to negotiation and mediation. The current international system and the conflict resolution model which the international community has utilised most since the end of the Cold War puts a premium on consent. But Shearer asks that if a belligerent uses negotiations and cease-fires as a method of delay in order to allow them to reposition military forces and continue fighting, then should consent-based strategies still be pursued, regardless of the potential for lengthening a conflict and the associated human cost?

According to the empirical analysis cited by Shearer, past civil wars with negotiated settlements have had little success. He cites a study from John Stedman that notes between 1900 and 1980 85% of civil wars were solved by one side winning outright (this excludes colonial wars). 15% percent ended as a result of negotiation. Additionally, Roy Licklider's study supports these conclusions by noting the following:

From 1945 to 1989, 58 out of a total of 93 civil conflicts, as he categorised them, were settled in some form, while the remainder continued. However, only 14 (or 24 percent) of those settled were solved by negotiation. The others (76 percent) ended with military victories. Additionally, fighting resumed in seven of the 14 conflict which were initially ended by negotiation. The overall success rate of negotiated settlements, therefore, was around 12 percent out of the internal wars that ended.

In Sierra Leone the Revolutionary United Front, led by Foday Sankoh, fought bloody civil war with the government from 1991 to 1996. The conflict attracted little international attention, but managed to devastate the country and destroy its economy. Neither belligerent was willing to concede or compromise on their demands, despite multiple attempts at a negotiated settlement. Sankoh would come to the table after the intervention of the private military corporation Executive Outcomes and a reversal in the RUF's battlefield fortunes. In the aftermath the RUF was a depleted threat, civilians were able to return from refugee camps and begin rebuilding their lives. But the peace was fragile and negotiations were ongoing. The RUF was reluctant to put down their arms, concerned over potential retribution at the hands of army units and civilian militias alike. There was a planned deployment of UN peacekeepers meant to ease these concerns and help with the transition to peace, but things began to unravel. International contributors began to shy away from further peacekeeping initiatives; such as an expensive and open-ended mission in a strategically unimportant country. As a result, the UN's intervention force was slow to come to fruition and then came to a halt completely when Sankoh argued the size of the contingent of 740 UN peacekeepers was too large. The UN refused to engage without total consent from both parties, thus preventing the deployment of a peacekeeping force. This consent-based approach, Shearer argues, illustrates the limits the UN can play in the volatile and fragile state of affairs that exist during and after civil wars. "In Sierra Leone, it meant that an important component needed to shore up the peace-building process was absent. It also meant that Sankoh was dictating terms." This consent-based approach effectively allowed the leadership of a brutal rebel group to hinder the potential for peace.

The situation was exacerbated by the fact that the newly elected President of Sierra Leone terminated the Executive Outcomes contract undermining his hard power advantage. Things were further inflamed when disaffected officers of the army overthrew the government in 1997. The war quickly renewed. A small UN force of monitors was deployed to observe the security situation. UNOMSIL, as it was called, was deployed between July 1998 and October 1999, but was forced to withdraw from the country when the RUF took the country's capitol.

UNAMSIL was eventually formed and deployed in 1999, authorised under a Chapter VII mandate, it was meant to enforce the Lome agreements. However, violence would continue. From the outset the RUF was beyond uncooperative and once the ECOMOG contingent withdrew, the RUF attacked UN forces, eventually taking hundreds hostage. This led to an unexpected backlash from the international community that the RUF did not anticipate. Its leadership had expected the international community to cut and run, as it had done in Somalia and earlier when UNOMSIL fled Freetown. Instead, with British support, an aggressive campaign was waged against the RUF. UNAMSIL's mandate was expanded and its manpower enlarged. By late 2000 and early 2001 the RUF's military strength had been severely depleted. Thus the Abuja agreements were signed and UNAMSIL fulfilled its mandate in December 2005. While Sierra Leone is at peace today and the UN's mission can be deemed a success, the way in which the situation developed illustrates Shearer's point: that a consent-based approach focused on negotiation that encompasses all belligerents' interest may not necessarily lead to success. As we see, fighting continued despite the presence of UNOMSIL. Indeed, even after UNOMSIL was replaced by a more robust force under a Chapter VII mandate in the form of UNAMSIL the violence continued. When the British intervened militarily and substantially degraded the RUF's capability to sustain the conflict, as Executive Outcomes had done years prior, the RUF finally come to the negotiating table and allowed for the establishment of peace.

Some authors question the idea of international interventions at all. In a 2005 working paper for the Center for Global Development, Jeremy Weinstein of Stanford University provides a theory of "autonomous recovery", in which states can achieve sustainable peace without international intervention. Using case studies of Uganda, Eritrea, and Somalia, Weinstein demonstrates how states can develop effective institutions out of warfare. This method has cost and benefits that must be weighed against the potential outcome of international intervention. External intervention can stop mass atrocities, but also stop institutional change. Autonomous recovery elevates the strongest leader, but also rewards the strongest fighters who may be less inclined to share power. Furthermore, intervention depends on external influence while autonomous recovery is based on internal factors. The conclusions of his argument could suggest intervention is not ideal policy, but Weinstein argues the international community's "responsibility to protect" doctrine has moral importance for intervention and the conditions for "autonomous recovery" are very rare. Weinstein argues the fundamental challenge is how to incentivise good governance and assistance to rebel groups without disrupting the connection of citizens to rulers in terms of revenue collection that enables accountability.

=== Mission creep ===
Although acknowledging a number of practical and moral reasons for peacekeeping operations, James Fearon and David Laitin assert that they have a tendency under some circumstances to become tangled with state-building efforts. In weak states facing successful guerrilla campaigns, peacekeepers face pressures to build state institutional and administrative capacity in order to achieve lasting peace. These pressures can lead to mission creep beyond the original purview of the peacekeeping operation; without engaging in state-building, the peacekeepers risk allowing the peacekept country to revert to violence following their exit. Thus, Fearon and Laitin advocate for the greater integration of state-building in peacekeeping efforts through a new framework of "neotrusteeship", which would see foreign powers exercising a great deal of control over a weak state's domestic affairs in order to ensure the prevention of future violence.

=== Lack of engagement with the populace ===
A growing critique of peacekeeping is the lack of engagement between the peacekeeping officials and the local populace. As Séverine Autesserre outlines in a 2015 Foreign Policy article, this creates an environment where the peacekeeping officials develop plans to 'keep' the peace, but they are disconnected from reality, having the opposite effect on the ground. Additionally, it creates a reinforcement mechanism for the peacekeeping officials, because the officials on the ground report that their plan was successfully implemented, but, in reality, it had adverse effects. If the situation on the ground turns into another outbreak of violence, the local populace will be blamed.

This criticism is similar to the critic levelled at development in developing countries by authors such as James C. Scott, James Ferguson, and L. Lohman. Although peacekeeping and development are two different things, the logic behind the criticism is the same. The third-party officials-whether they are peacekeepers or agents of development-are isolated from the general populace, believing they know what is best, and refusing to gather information from a ground level. This is not out of maliciousness or imperialism, but out of a legitimate belief that they, as educated officials with access to other experts and who are well versed in development and peacekeeping literature, know what is best.

=== Meta-organisational challenges ===
Another area of critique focuses on barriers to peacekeeping effectiveness that arise from the UN system itself. Jarrod Pendlebury, Neil Stott and Paul Tracey argue that the UN's status as a meta-organisation (that is, an organisation that is itself composed of independent organisations) impedes its peacekeeping effectiveness in two key areas: decision-making and innovation. These challenges complicate the UN's ability to plan, force-generate and conduct peacekeeping missions due to complicated organisational dynamics, identity clashes, dispersed lines of command and control, minimal horizontal integration, complex funding mechanisms and systemic inertia.

== Proposed reform ==
=== Brahimi analysis ===
In response to criticism, particularly of the cases of sexual abuse by peacekeepers, the UN has taken steps toward reforming its operations. The Brahimi Report was the first of many steps to recap former peacekeeping missions, isolate flaws, and take steps to patch these mistakes to ensure the efficiency of future peacekeeping missions. The UN has vowed to continue to put these practices into effect when performing peacekeeping operations in the future. The technocratic aspects of the reform process have been continued and revitalised by the DPKO in its "Peace Operations 2010" reform agenda. This included an increase in personnel, the harmonisation of the conditions of service of field and headquarters staff, the development of guidelines and standard operating procedures, and improving the partnership arrangement between the Department of Peacekeeping Operations (DPKO) and the United Nations Development Programme (UNDP), African Union, and European Union. A 2008 capstone doctrine entitled "United Nations Peacekeeping Operations: Principles and Guidelines" incorporates and builds on the Brahimi analysis.

One of the main issues that the Brahimi report identifies is the lack of coordination and planning of the Peacekeeping Operations. Also, the difference between the objectives of the Peacekeeping Operations and the resources destined to fund the missions. Therefore, the report asks the Security Council to make clear the goals and the resources to accomplish them. According to Fearon and Laitin, the Brahimi Report provides a political instrument for the secretary-general to negotiate with the Security Council the goals, the troops, and the resources need it to the operations. This instrument tries to avoid the cases of underfunding presented in Missions such as in Bosnia, Somalia, and Sierra Leone.

Christine Gray analyses the issues of implementing the recommendations of the Brahimi Report. She explains the difficulty in implementing these recommendations. In particular, in reducing the gap between the mandates of Security Council and the actual resources devoted to implementing them.

== See also ==
- Bangladesh UN Peacekeeping Force
- Canadian peacekeeping
- List of United Nations peacekeeping missions
- List of countries by number of UN peacekeepers
- List of countries where UN peacekeepers are currently deployed
- List of non-UN peacekeeping missions
- Multinational Force and Observers
- Military operations other than war
- Temporary International Presence in Hebron
- Timeline of UN peacekeeping missions
