= Wenche Barth Eide =

Norwegian human rights scholar

- Born: Wenche Barth; 3 January 1935 (age 91); Oslo, Norway
- Spouse: Asbjørn Eide
- Scientific career
- Fields: Nutrition
- Workplaces: University of Oslo

Wenche Barth Eide (born 3 January 1935) is a Norwegian nutritionist.

== Personal life ==
She is the daughter of Jacob Bøckmann Barth (1898-1974) and Solveig Herstad (1900-1987) and married human rights scholar Asbjørn Eide (b. 1933) in 1959. Barth Eide is the mother of Espen Barth Eide, former Norwegian Minister of Climate and the Environment and former Minister of Defence (2011–12) and current Minister of Foreign Affairs (2023–, 2012–13).

== Biography ==
Barth Eide completed her Master's Degree (Cand. real.) of Zoology (Zoo-physiology) from the University of Oslo in 1962 and Postgraduate Academic Diploma in Nutrition from the University of London (1965–66). She became a University Fellow at the Institute for Nutrition Research (1963–66) and then moved to the US with her husband to become a Consultant to the UN System (UN Protein-Calorie Advisory Group, PAG). She led an African-Norwegian team to prepare a first-ever report of the UN on Women in Food Production, Food Handling and Nutrition, on leave from UiO for 18 months (1975-1976). She was a Consultant for the Norwegian Research Council (at the time Council for Research on Societal Planning, RFSP) and had a two-month leave in 1981 to draft a programme for research in economic, social, and cultural rights, as developed by an expert committee. Then, she became a Technical Adviser in Nutrition at the International Fund for Agricultural Development (IFAD) in Rome (1989–94) on leave from UiO. Barth Eide was an Associate Professor at the University of Oslo, Department of Nutrition (until 1997 under the Nordic School of Nutrition). Her tenure ended in 2005, but she had temporary employment from January–February 2011. She has been in an emeritus position since 2013.

Barth Eide served as the leader of the Centre for International Development Studies (SIU) at the University of Oslo from 1981 to 1988. She was also a member of Norad’s Research Committee and the Central Committee for Norwegian Research (Hovedkomiteen for Norsk Forskning) from around 1980. In the 1990s, she became a member of the Norwegian Institute of International Affairs (NUPI) (1995–98) and the International Food Policy Research Institute (IFPRI), Washington D.C. (1996-2003). She has been on the Board of Trustees of the International Foundation for Science (IFS) since 2008.

== Honors ==
- 2005: The Internationalisation Prize of the Oslo Student Parliament

== Publications (in selection) ==
- 2001: "Breaking Conceptual and Methodological Ground: Promoting the Human Right to Adequate Food and Nutrition. An example of activism with an academic base". Ecology of Food and Nutrition 40(6): 571- 595
- 2002: "Nutrition and Human Rights", In: Nutrition: A Foundation for Development, UN ACC/Sub-Committee on Nutrition
- 2003: "Mobilising states and other actors for a rights-based approach to food and nutritional health", In Moderne aspects of nutrition: present knowledge and future perspectives, Wenche Barth Eide, Arne Oshaug, & Ousmane Sidibe, Krager, pp. 141 – 142.
