= Siri Staalesen =

Norwegian politician

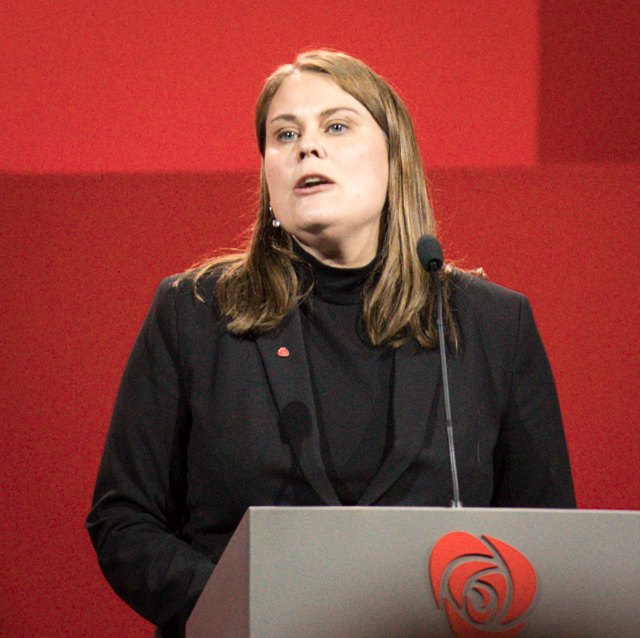
- Staalesen in 2017

Deputy Member of the Storting
- In office 1 October 2021 – 30 September 2025
- Deputising for: Espen Barth Eide (2021–2025)
- Constituency: Oslo
- In office 1 October 2009 – 30 September 2013
- Constituency: Oslo

Member of the Storting
- In office 1 October 2017 – 30 September 2021
- Constituency: Oslo

Personal details
- Born: 30 June 1973 (age 53)
- Party: Labour
- Education: University of Oslo
- Occupation: Politician

Siri Gåsemyr Staalesen (born 30 June 1973) is a Norwegian politician.

== Biography ==
Staalesen was elected representative to the Storting from the constituency of Oslo for the period 2017–2021 for the Labour Party. She was elected deputy representative to the Storting for the period 2021–2025, having previously been a deputy representative between 2009 and 2013. She deputised for Espen Barth Eide between 2021 and 2025, who is serving in government. She announced in August 2024 that she wouldn't seek re-election at the 2025 election.

She has studied history at the University of Oslo.
