= Elizabeth Spehar =

Canadian diplomat

Elizabeth Mary Spehar is a Canadian diplomat and senior United Nations official. She was appointed as Assistant Secretary-General for Peacebuilding Support in the Department of Political and Peacebuilding Affairs by UN Secretary General António Guterres on 18 January 2022. She previously held roles as Secretary-General’s Special Representative and Head of the United Nations Peacekeeping Force in Cyprus (UNFICYP), Director of the Policy and Mediation Division in the former Department of Political Affairs, Director for the Americas and Europe Division and Director of the Europe Division in DPA.

== Biography ==
Spehar was born in Port Arthur, Ontario (now Thunder Bay, Ontario), Canada, and has one daughter. She is a graduate of Queen's University in Canada with a Bachelor of Arts. She also holds a master's degree in international affairs from Carleton University and a diploma from the University of Pau in France.

Early in her career, Spehar worked for a variety of organizations including the MATCH International Women's Fund, and the United Nations Development Programme Office in Cape Verde, and consulted for the International Development and Research Centre the Canadian International Development Agency.

From 1990 to 1994, Spehar headed the Americas Programme of the International Centre for Human Rights and Democratic Development (ICHRDD).

For more than 12 years, she worked with the Organization of American States where she was a senior official, including 9 years as the executive coordinator for the Unit for the Promotion of Democracy in Washington DC for 9 years, and as chief of the OAS Electoral Support Program in Haiti (2005-6).

Spehar joined the United Nations Department of Political Affairs in 2007. During this time she has held several key positions including Director of the Europe Division and Director for the Americas and Europe Division. In 2008, she also held the position as Interim Special Representative of the Secretary-General and Head of UNFICYP.

Prior to this appointment of 30 March 2016, she was the Director of the Policy and Mediation Division with the United Nations Department of Political Affairs. Ms. Spehar has held positions in the past that included serving as the Director of the Policy and Mediation Division, as well as Director of the Americas and Europe Division and Director of the Europe Division. While holding those positions she focused substantially on political conflicts which were facing the region at that time.

As Head of the United Nations Peacekeeping Force in Cyprus (UNFICYP), she was the successor to Lisa M. Buttenheim, who completed her term in June 2016. Aside from her position of Head of the Nations Peacekeeping Force in Cyprus (UNFICYP), she also acted as the Deputy to the Secretary-General’s Special Adviser.

She was succeeded as Head of UNFICYP by the Canadian diplomat Colin Stewart on 30 November 2021 and became Assistant Secretary-General for Peacebuilding Support in the Department of Political and Peacebuilding Affairs shortly after on 18 January 2022. This role is part of the UN's Senior Management Group, a group of around 50 senior UN officials who oversee various portfolios within the UN Secretariat and advise the Secretary General.
