= Asbjørn Eide =

Norwegian human rights scholar (1933–2026)

- Born: 11 February 1933; Voss Municipality, Hordaland, Norway
- Died: 14 October 2026 (aged 93)
- Spouse: Wenche Barth Eide (m. 1959)
- Children: Espen Barth Eide
- Scientific career
- Fields: Law, social science
- Workplaces: University of Oslo

Director of Peace Research Institute Oslo
- In office 1970, 1980 – 1981
- Preceded by: Johan Galtung
- Succeeded by: Helge Hveem

Asbjørn Eide (11 February 1933 – 14 October 2026) was a Norwegian human rights scholar with a base in law and social science research. He was one of Norway's foremost experts on human rights. As a researcher and specialist, he was particularly concerned with Indigenous and minority issues, and he held important assignments in these fields in Norway and the United Nations system.

== Career ==
Eide was the founding Director of the Norwegian Center for Human Rights at the University of Oslo, having first started (with Torkel Opsahl) the Human Rights Project at the Peace Research Institute Oslo which became the Norwegian Institute of Human Rights. From 1971 to 1975, Secretary-General of the International Peace Research Association.

In 1981 Eide was elected member of the UN Sub-Commission on the Promotion and Protection of Human Rights (UN Sub-Commission on Human Rights, 1981—2003). He was subsequently re-elected several times as the only Nordic member, and was responsible for developing several of its studies. As a member of the Sub-Commission Eide was one of the advocates for the establishment of the Working Group on Indigenous Populations, and became its first chairman from 1982 to 1983. This was the first official international forum where the Indigenous peoples' representatives could present their requests and demands. The work has been of great importance for further developing international law on Indigenous peoples.

After the end of the Cold War and the dissolution of the Soviet Union, there was an outbreak of many serious ethnic conflicts. Eide prepared a study for the Commission on "peaceful and constructive ways" to address minority situations. This study led the UN to initiate a new working group to protect minorities, and Eide was chair of this UN Working Group on the Rights of Minorities (1995—2004). Eide has also published a large number of articles and books, alone or together with Nordic and international colleagues in the fields of peace research and international human rights. He has been in the forefront of supporting open access in international law through his publications and as Principal Scientific Adviser to the Torkel Opsahl Academic EPublisher.

== Personal life and death ==
Eide was married on 10 October 1959, to professor of nutritional physiology Wenche Barth Eide (born 1935), and the father of former Norwegian Minister of Defence (2011–12) and Minister of Foreign Affairs (2012–13, 2023-) Espen Barth Eide. He died on 14 October 2026, at the age of 93, only days after his 67th wedding anniversary.

== Honors ==
- 2010: Order of St. Olav awarded for his work on Human rights

== Publications (in selection) ==
- 1978: Fattig, ufri og mishandlet. Om det internasjonale menneskerettighetsvernet
- 1979: The World Military Order (with Mary Kaldor)
- 1980: Problems of Contemporary Militarism (with M. Thee)
- 1984: Food as a Human Right
- 1992: The Universal Declaration of Human Rights: A Commentary
- 1992: Human Rights in Perspective. A Global Assessment (with Bernt Hagtvet eds.)
- 1995: Peaceful and Constructive Resolution of Situations Involving Minorities
- 1999: The Universal Declaration of Human Rights. A Common Standard of Achievement (with Gudmundur Alfredsson eds.)
