= God morgen Norge =

Norwegian television program

God morgen Norge (English: Good Morning Norway) is a Norwegian morning-based current affairs program airing on TV 2 since 24 October 1994. It is broadcast every morning from Monday to Friday between 06.55 and approx. 10.00 (until autumn 2008: 06.25 to approx. 09.45). Every half an hour there is an update of news and weather forecast from TV 2 Nyhetskanalen. The program otherwise consists of reports, current guests and music in the studio. TV chefs Wenche Andersen and Christer Rødseth also cook every day and once a week flower decorator Finn Schjøll is a guest.

TV 2 produced the program itself until 2019, when the production company Mastiff took over the production.

The program by Knut Torgersruud jr. won FONO's Bjellesauprisen in 2009 for his "long-term and almost daily efforts for Norwegian artists from a wide musical field."
