= Helge Hveem =

Norwegian political scientist and politician

Director of Peace Research Institute Oslo
- In office 1971–1971
- Preceded by: Asbjørn Eide
- Succeeded by: Nils Petter Gleditsch

Helge Hveem (born 17 May 1941) is a Norwegian political scientist and politician for the Liberal Party.

He was born in Bærum, and grew up at Økri farm. and graduated with the mag.art. degree in 1968. In 1965 he chaired the Norwegian Students' Society. He was employed at the University of Oslo in 1980, and was promoted to professor in 1992. He has written on international politics; notable books include International Relations and World Images (1972), En ny økonomisk verdensordning og Norge (1977), Complex Cooperation (ed., 1994), Internasjonalisering og politikk (1994) and Makt og velferd i det globale samfunn (1996).

As a politician he has served as a member of Bærum municipal council and as a member of the Liberal Party central board from 1980 to 1984. He has also worked in Dagbladet and the Norwegian Broadcasting Corporation. In his younger days he participated in track and field, and was stationed with the United Nations Operation in the Congo for seven months. He was an official in the then-track club Fossum IF, and was instrumental in getting to arrange the 1985 Norwegian Championships.
