= Abuja Agreement =

Abuja Agreement or Abuja Accord may refer to:

- Abuja Accord (Liberia), a peace treaty signed 19 August 1995 in an attempt to end the Liberian Civil War
- Abuja Agreement (Sierra Leone), a series of treaties were signed in Sierra Leone marking an end to the Sierra Leone Civil War in 2000 and 2001
- Abuja Agreement (Sudan), the 2006 Abuja Agreement of the Darfur Peace Agreement
- See United Nations Peacebuilding Support Office in Guinea-Bissau for Abuja Accord, 1998
- Abuja Treaty, an international agreement signed on 3 June 1991 in Abuja, Nigeria
