= Lisa M. Buttenheim =

American diplomat (born 1954)

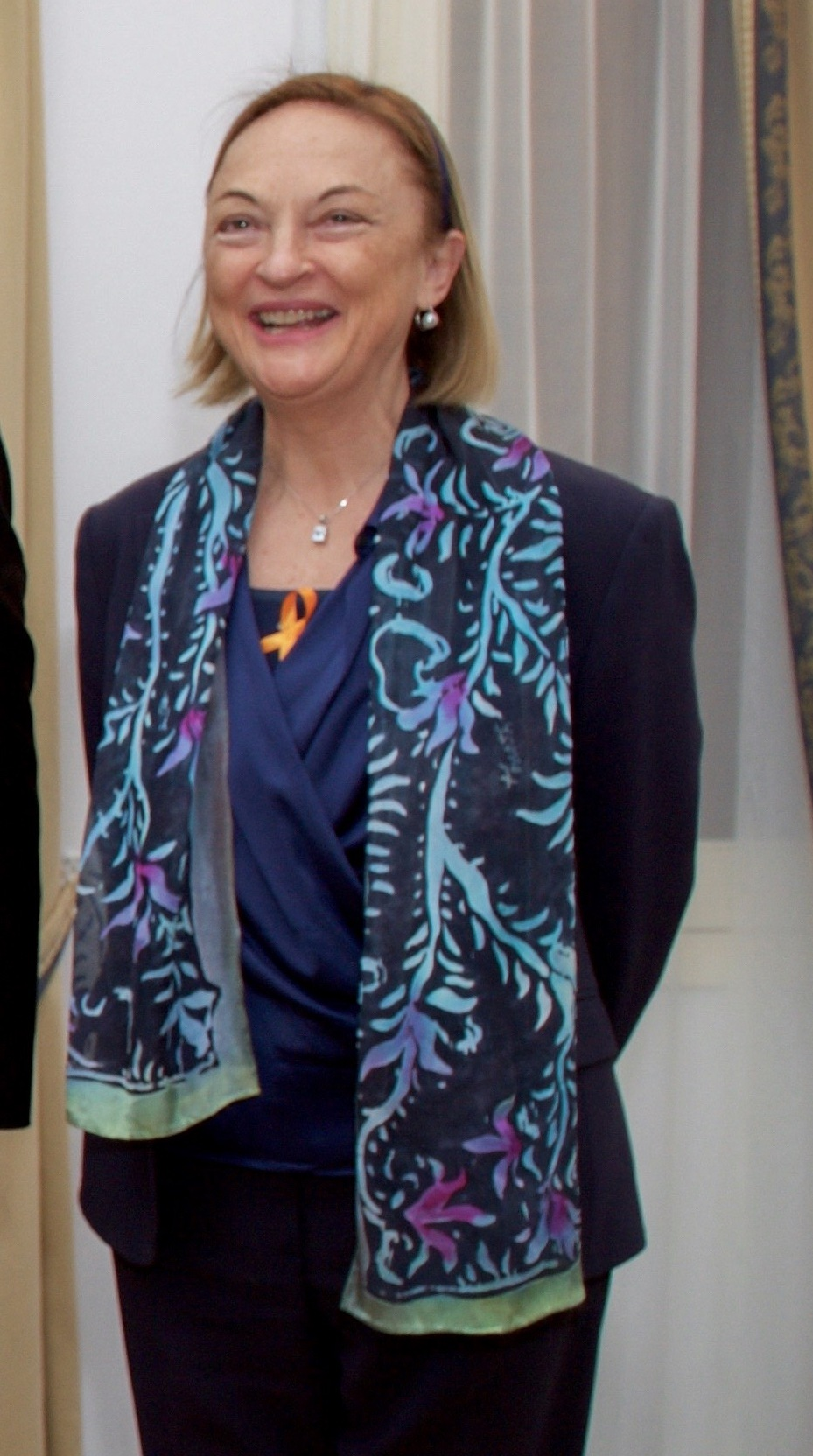
Lisa M. Buttenheim

Lisa M. Buttenheim (born 1954), a national of the United States, is the United Nations Assistant Secretary-General for the Department of Field Support. She was previously the Special Representative and Head of the United Nations Peacekeeping Force in Cyprus (UNFICYP) from 2010 to June 2016. She was appointed to the post by United Nations Secretary-General Ban Ki-moon on 2 June 2010. She has extensive experience with the United Nations in political affairs and peacekeeping.

== Early life ==
Lisa M. Buttenheim was born January 1, 1954, in Lookout Mountain TN, United States of America. Her mother is Patricia L. Johnson and her father is Curtis Raymond Buttenheim. Curtis was a veteran in World War two and worked in numerous fields performing tasks from teaching to publishing. She was one of four children in a medium size family, including two brothers, Edgar J. Buttenheim and Curtis R. Buttenheim Junior, and one sister, Patricia M. Buttenheim. Growing up the Buttenheim family traveled often before settling in and completing her Kindergarten through high school education. Following high school, Buttenhiem attended Stanford University where she graduated with both a bachelor's degree in political science and English following in her father's footsteps. She finished her education by devoting her time at the world preannounced Johns Hopkins University in Baltimore, Maryland. There she earned a master's degree in International economics and Middle Eastern studies discovering her passion for international policy.

== Personal life ==
On June 28, 1992, Lisa M. Buttenheim married fellow United Nations officer Jean- Claude Aime of Haiti. They currently resided until recently in Nicosia, Cyprus without the presence of any children. On March 12, 2012, Buttenheim's father, Curtis R. Buttenheim, died in Pittsfield, Massachusetts.

== Career ==
In March 1983, Lisa M. Buttenheim began her involvement in the United Nations, and so far has dedicated her life for 30 years. She served on numerous departments and carried a variety of leadership positions and focused closely on humanitarian efforts towards the United Nations peacekeeping efforts. In some ways Buttenheim's first significant role was as a “Senior Political Adviser in the Office of the Director-General, United Nations Office at Geneva” over the course from May 1997 to February 2003. For three years, from April 2004 to December 2007, Buttenheim was the director of the Asia and Middle East Division in the United Nations Department of Peace Operations. Her most current job with the United Nations as Assistant Secretary-General for Field Support.
