= James Duff, 5th Earl Fife =

Scottish nobleman and politician

The Right Honourable The Earl Fife KT
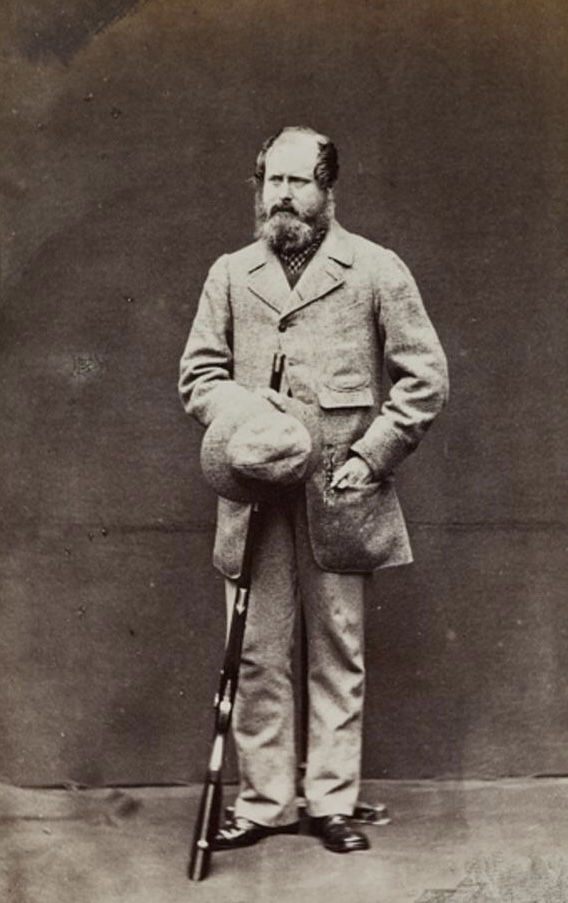
- The Earl Fife in 1863

Member of Parliament for Banffshire
- In office 1837–1857
- Preceded by: George Ferguson
- Succeeded by: Lachlan Gordon-Duff

Personal details
- Born: James Duff; 6 July 1814 Edinburgh, Scotland
- Died: 7 August 1879 (aged 65)
- Spouse: Lady Agnes Hay (m. 1846; died 1869)
- Children: 5
- Parent(s): Sir Alexander Duff; Anne Stein

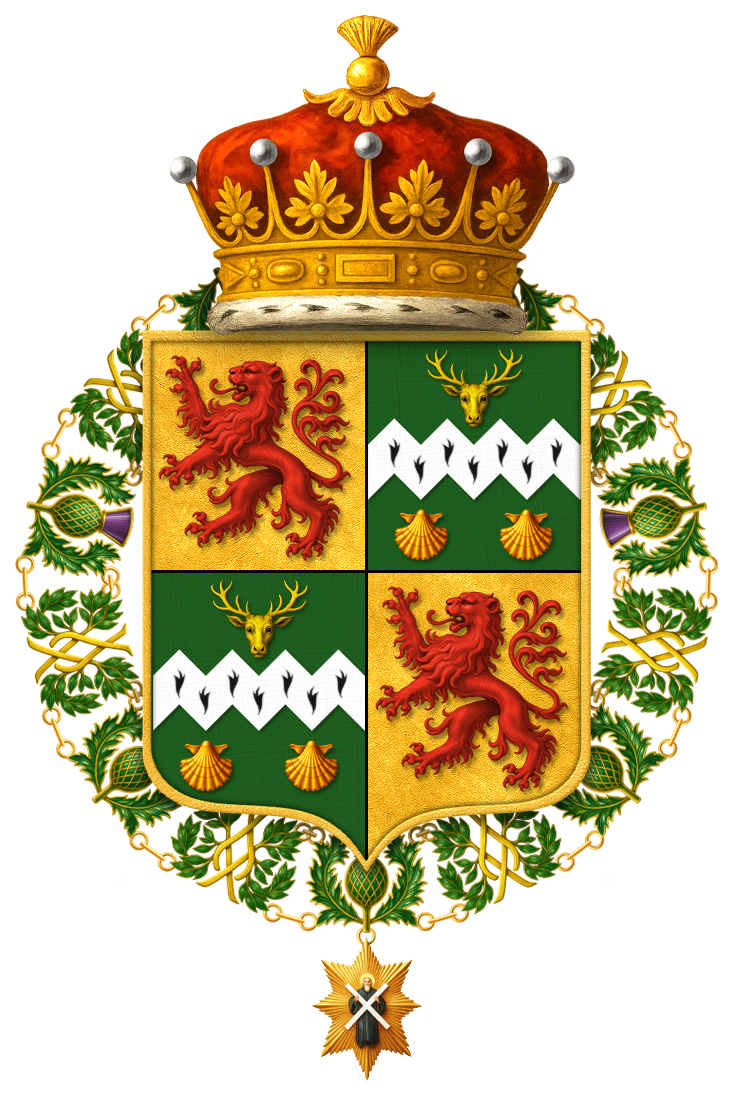
Shield of Arms of James Duff, 5th Earl Fife, KT

James Duff, 5th Earl Fife, KT (6 July 1814 – 7 August 1879) was a Scottish nobleman and politician.

== Early life ==
Duff was the son of Sir Alexander Duff, younger brother of James Duff, 4th Earl Fife, and Anne Stein, the daughter of James Stein of Kilbagie and Kennetpans House.

== Career ==
He was Member of Parliament for Banffshire from 1837 to 1857; his brother, George Skene Duff, was Member of Parliament for Elgin Burghs. He succeeded as the 5th Earl Fife, 5th Baron Braco of Kilbryde, and 5th Viscount MacDuff on 9 March 1857, and inherited many baronies including MacDuff, named for James Duff, 2nd Earl Fife. He was also created Baron Skene, of Skene, in the Peerage of the United Kingdom, on 26 September 1857 in his own right, which allowed him to sit and vote in the House of Lords. He was appointed Knight of the Order of the Thistle (K.T.) in 1860.

He was appointed Lord Lieutenant of the counties of Banff and Moray.

== Personal life ==
In 1845, Duff resided at 30 Pall Mall, London and at Delgatie Castle.

On 16 March 1846, he married Lady Agnes Georgiana Elizabeth Hay, daughter of William Hay, 18th Earl of Erroll and Lady Elizabeth FitzClarence (illegitimate daughter of William IV). Together, they were the parents of five children, including:

- Lady Anne Elizabeth Clementine Duff (16 August 1847 – 31 December 1925), who married John Townshend, 5th Marquess Townshend, and had two children.
- Lady Ida Louisa Alice Duff (10 December 1848 – 29 May 1918), who married firstly Adrian Elias Hope, of Deepdene House, and had one daughter. They were divorced and she married secondly William Wilson, a London stockbroker, with no issue.
- Alexander William George Duff (10 November 1849 – 29 January 1912), who was created Duke of Fife in 1889. He married Princess Louise, the eldest daughter of Edward VII. They had three children.
- Lady Alexina Duff (20 March 1851 – 30 April 1882), who married Henry Coventry, third son of Hon. Henry Amilius Coventry, and died without issue.
- Lady Agnes Cecil Emmeline Duff (18 May 1852 – 11 January 1925), who married firstly George Hay-Drummond, son of George Hay-Drummond, 12th Earl of Kinnoull, and had one daughter. She married secondly Herbert Flower (brother of Cyril Flower, 1st Baron Battersea), with no issue. She married thirdly Alfred Cooper, with four children (Duff Cooper, 1st Viscount Norwich). David Cameron, the former British prime minister, is a descendant of this third marriage.

Lord Fife died on 7 August 1879.

== Ancestry ==
Ancestors of James Duff, 5th Earl Fife

16. William Duff
8. William Duff, Earl Fife
17. Helen Gordon
4. Alexander Duff, Earl Fife
18. Sir James Grant, 6th Bt.
9. Jean Grant
19. Anne Colquhoun
2. General Sir Alexander Duff
20. George Skene, 17th of Skene
10. George Skene, 18th of Skene
21. Elizabeth Skene
5. Mary Skene
22. George Forbes
11. Mary Forbes
23. Jane Skene
1.James Duff, Earl Fife
24. Andrew Stein
12. John Stein of Kennetpans
25. Anna MacKenzie
6. James Stein of Kilbagie
26. Robert Caldom
13. Margaret Caldom
27. Margaret Lamont
3. Anne Stein
14. John Buchanan
7. Catherine Buchanan
15. Jean Harley

Parliament of the United Kingdom
Preceded by George Ferguson	Member of Parliament for Banffshire; 1837–1857	Succeeded by Lachlan Gordon-Duff
Honorary titles
Preceded by Sir Alexander Duff	Lord Lieutenant of Elginshire; 1851–1856	Succeeded by George Skene Duff
Preceded by The Earl Fife	Lord Lieutenant of Banffshire; 1856–1879	Succeeded by The Duke of Richmond
Peerage of Ireland
Preceded by James Duff	Earl Fife; 1857–1879	Succeeded by Alexander Duff
Peerage of the United Kingdom
New creation	Baron Skene; 1857–1879	Succeeded by Alexander Duff
