= Earl Fife =

Peerage of Ireland created in 1759

- 1st and 4th: Or, a lion, rampant, gules (Macduff) 2nd and 3rd: vert, a fesse dancettee, ermine between a hart's head, cabossed, in chief, and two escallops in base or (Duff)
- Creation date: 26 April 1759
- Created by: King George II
- Peerage: Peerage of Ireland
- First holder: William Duff, 1st Baron Braco
- Last holder: Alexander Duff, 6th Earl Fife
- Remainder to: 1st Earl's heirs male of the body
- Subsidiary titles: Viscount Macduff; Baron Braco; Baron Skene
- Extinction date: 29 January 1912
- Former seats: Duff House; Balvenie Castle; Innes House; Mar Lodge; Skene House; Delgatie Castle
- Motto: Deo juvante (Latin for 'With God's help')

Earl Fife was a title in the Peerage of Ireland created by letters patent dated 26 April 1759 for William Duff, 1st Baron Braco, after asserting (but not proving) his descent from Macduff, the medieval Earl of Fife. Though in the Irish peerage, the title's name refers to Fife in Scotland.

== History ==
William Duff, 1st Earl Fife, had previously been created Baron Braco, of Kilbryde in the County of Cavan, in 1735, and he was created Viscount Macduff at the same time that he was raised to the earldom. Both of these junior titles were in the Peerage of Ireland, although they referred to places in Scotland – namely Braco and Macduff in Banffshire.

Between 1790 and 1885, the Earls Fife received several additional titles in the Peerage of Great Britain and of the United Kingdom, respectively, which allowed them to sit and vote in the House of Lords. In 1790, the 2nd Earl was created Baron Fife, of the County of Fife, in the Peerage of Great Britain, but this title became extinct on his death in 1809. The 4th Earl was also created Baron Fife, of the County of Fife, in the Peerage of the United Kingdom, in 1827, but this title became extinct on his death in 1857. Later that year, the 5th Earl was created Baron Skene, of Skene in the County of Aberdeen, in the Peerage of the United Kingdom. In 1885, the 6th Earl was created Earl of Fife in the Peerage of the United Kingdom.

In 1889, the 6th Earl Fife was further created Duke of Fife, in Scotland, and Marquess of Macduff, in the County of Banff, in the Peerage of the United Kingdom, two days after his marriage to Princess Louise of Wales, the eldest daughter of Albert Edward, Prince of Wales (the future King Edward VII). When it became clear that he would have no sons, he was further created Duke of Fife and Earl of Macduff, in the County of Banff, also in the Peerage of the United Kingdom, with a special remainder to his daughters and their heirs male.

When the 1st Duke died in 1912 without male issue, the earldom of 1759 became extinct, along with the first Dukedom of Fife, the Marquessate of Macduff, the 1885 Earldom of Fife, the Viscountcy of Macduff and the Baronies of Braco and Skene. The second Dukedom of Fife and the Earldom of Macduff passed by their special remainders to his daughters and their heirs male. Princess Alexandra of Fife thus succeeded to the second Dukedom of Fife. (See Duke of Fife for the succession to those titles.)

== Barons Braco (1735) ==
- William Duff, 1st Baron Braco (c. 1696–1763), created Earl Fife in 1759

== Earls Fife (1759) ==
- William Duff, 1st Earl Fife (c. 1696–1763)
- James Duff, 2nd Earl Fife (1729–1809)
- Alexander Duff, 3rd Earl Fife (1731–1811)
- James Duff, 4th Earl Fife (1776–1857)
- James Duff, 5th Earl Fife (1814–1879)
- Alexander Duff, 6th Earl Fife (1849–1912), created Earl of Fife in 1885 and Duke of Fife in 1889

== Family tree ==
Family tree: Earls of Fife, Dukes of Fife, Earls of Southesk and Earls of Northesk

(Mormaers) Earls of Fife (Scot)
Donnchad (Duncan) I 1113–1154; Earl of Fife
Donnchad (Duncan/Dunecan) II d. 1204; Earl of Fife
Máel Coluim (Maol Choluim, Malcolm) I 1204–1228; Earl of Fife	Donnchadh
Máel Coluim (Malcolm) II c. Early 13th century–1266 Earl of Fife
Colban c. 1247–1253–1270/1272; Earl of Fife
Donnchadh (Duncan) III; 1270/1272–1288; Earl of Fife
Robert II of Scotland; 1316–1390; King of Scotland	Donnchadh (Duncan) IV; 1289–1353; Earl of Fife
Robert III of Scotland c. 1337–1406; King of Scotland	m1. Walter Stewart c. 1338–1362; Earl of Fife jure uxoris	Isabella MacDuff c. 1320–1389; Countess of Fife suo jure	Robert Stewart c. 1340–1420; Duke of Albany, Earl of Fife, Earl of Menteith, Earl of Buchan, Earl of Atholl	m2. Thomas Bisset d. 1366; Earl of Fife jure uxoris	m3. John Dunbar d. before 1371; Earl of Fife jure uxoris
Murdoch Stewart; 1362–1425; Earl of Fife; Duke of Albany
David Carnegie of Colluthie; 1559–1598
Earl of Southesk, 1633
David Carnegie; 1575–1658; 1st Earl of Southesk
Earl of Northesk, 1662
John Carnegie; 1611–1667; 1st Earl of Northesk
James Carnegie before 1583–1669; 2nd Earl of Southesk	Alexander Carnegie d. 1681/82	David Carnegie d. 1669; 2nd Earl of Northesk
Robert Carnegie before 1649–1688; 3rd Earl of Southesk	David Carnegie d. 1708; 1st Baronet	David Carnegie; 1643–1688; 3rd Earl of Northesk	Patrick Carnegie of Lour after 1643–1743
Charles Carnegie; 1661–1699; 4th Earl of Southesk	James Carnegie; 1673–1729; 2nd Baronet	David Carnegie; 1675–1729; 4th Earl of Northesk	Patrick Carnegie of Lour; 1684–1729
Viscount Macduff and Baron Braco, 1735; Earl Fife, 1759
William Duff; 1697–1763; 1st Earl Fife, etc.	James Carnegie; 1692–1730; 5th Earl of Southesk	James Carnegie; 1716–1765 de jure 6th Earl of Southesk	David Carnegie; 1701–1741; 5th Earl of Northesk	George Carnegie; 1716–1792; 6th Earl of Northesk	Patrick Carnegie of Lour; 1720–1799
Earldom of Southesk attainted, 1716
Baron Fife (GB), 1790
James Duff; 1729–1809; 2nd Earl Fife, etc., Baron Fife (GB)	Alexander Duff; 1731–1811; 3rd Earl Fife, etc.	David Carnegie; 1753–1805 de jure 7th Earl of Southesk	William Carnegie; 1756–1831; 7th Earl of Northesk	Patrick Carnegie of Lour; 1757–1819
Baron Fife (GB) extinct, 1809
Baron Fife (UK), 1827
James Duff; 1776–1857; 4th Earl Fife, etc., Baron Fife (UK)	Alexander Duff; 1777–1851	James Carnegie; 1799–1849 de jure 8th Earl of Southesk	William Hopetoun Carnegie; 1794–1878; 8th Earl of Northesk	Alexander Carnegie; 1793–1862
Baron Fife (UK) extinct, 1809
Baron Skene, 1857	Southesk attainder reversed, 1855
Queen Victoria; 1819–1901	James Duff; 1814–1879; 5th Earl Fife, etc., 1st Baron Skene	James Carnegie; 1827–1905; 9th Earl of Southesk	Alexander Carnegie; 1829–1900
King Edward VII; 1841–1910	Prince Arthur; 1850–1942; Duke of Connaught and Strathearn	George John Carnegie; 1843–1891; 9th Earl of Northesk
Earl of Fife, 1885; Duke of Fife (Scotland), 1889; Duke of Fife (UK), Marquess of Macduff, and Earl of Macduff, 1900
King George V 1865–1936	Louise, Princess Royal; 1867–1931; Duchess of Fife	Alexander William George Duff; 1849–1912; 1st Duke of Fife (Scot) and Earl of Fife, 1st Duke of Fife (UK) and Earl of Macduff, Marquess of Macduff; 6th Earl Fife, etc., 2nd Baron Skene	Charles Noel Carnegie; 1854–1941; 10th Earl of Southesk	David John Carnegie; 1865–1921; 10th Earl of Northesk	Douglas George Carnegie; 1870–1937	Charles Carnegie; 1864–1928
Dukedom of Fife (Scot), Marquess of Macduff, Earldom Fife (1759), Viscountcy of Macduff, and Baronies of Braco and Skene extinct, 1912
Prince Arthur of Connaught; 1883–1938	Princess Alexandra; 1891–1959; 2nd Duchess of Fife (UK), etc. suo jure	Maud Carnegie; 1893–1945; Countess of Southesk	Charles Alexander Bannerman Carnegie; 1893–1992; 11th Earl of Southesk	David Ludovic George Hopetoun Carnegie; 1901–1963; 11th Earl of Northesk	John Douglas Carnegie; 1895–1975; 12th Earl of Northesk	Patrick Carnegy; 1893–1969
Prince Alastair Arthur (later Alistair Windsor); 1914–1943; Duke of Connaught and Strathearn	James George Alexander Bannerman Carnegie; 1929–2015; 3rd Duke of Fife, etc., 12th Earl of Southesk	Robert Andrew Carnegie; 1926–1994; 13th Earl of Northesk	Patrick Charles Carnegy b. 1940; 15th Earl of Northesk	Colin Carnegy b. 1942
Heir presumptive to the Earldom of Northesk
David Charles Carnegie b. 1961; 4th Duke of Fife, etc., 13th Earl of Southesk	David John MacRae Carnegie; 1954–2010; 14th Earl of Northesk
Charles Carnegie b. 1989 styled Earl of Southesk	George Carnegie b. 1991	Hugh Carnegie b. 1993
Heir apparent
