= Alexander Duff =

Alexander Duff may refer to:

- Alexander Duff, 3rd Earl Fife (1731–1811), Scottish nobleman
- Sir Alexander Duff (British Army officer) (1777–1851), Scottish general and Lord-Lieutenant of Moray
- Alexander Duff (missionary) (1806–1878), Scottish missionary
- Alexander Duff, 1st Duke of Fife (1849–1912), Scottish nobleman and son-in-law of King Edward VII
- Sir Alexander Duff (Royal Navy officer) (1862–1933), British admiral
