= Alexander Duff, 1st Duke of Fife =

Scottish nobleman (1849–1912)

His Grace The Duke of Fife KG KT GCVO VD PC
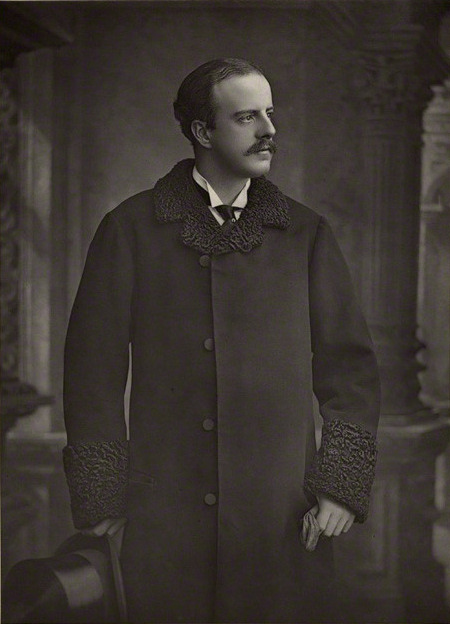
- The Duke of Fife, c. 1889

Captain of the Honourable Corps of Gentlemen-at-Arms
- In office 3 May 1880 – 21 January 1881
- Preceded by: The Earl of Coventry
- Succeeded by: The Marquess of Huntly

Personal details
- Born: 10 November 1849 Edinburgh, Scotland
- Died: 29 January 1912 (aged 62) Aswan, Egypt
- Resting place: Royal Vault, St George's Chapel, Windsor Castle, and later St Ninian's Chapel, Braemar
- Spouse: Louise, Princess Royal (m. 1889)
- Children: Alastair, Marquess of Macduff; Princess Alexandra, 2nd Duchess of Fife; Princess Maud, Countess of Southesk
- Parents: James Duff, 5th Earl Fife (father); Lady Agnes Hay (mother)

Alexander William George Duff, 1st Duke of Fife (10 November 1849 – 29 January 1912), styled Viscount Macduff between 1857 and 1879 and known as the Earl Fife between 1879 and 1889, was a Scottish nobleman and peer who married Princess Louise, the third child and eldest daughter of King Edward VII and Queen Alexandra.

== Early life ==
Fife was born Alexander Duff in Edinburgh, the son of James Duff (later 5th Earl Fife) and his wife, Lady Agnes Hay. His father was a grandson of the 3rd Earl Fife and heir presumptive to the 4th Earl Fife. His mother was the second daughter of the 18th Earl of Erroll and his wife, Elizabeth FitzClarence, an illegitimate daughter of King William IV. When his father succeeded as 5th Earl Fife in 1857, Duff acquired the courtesy title of "Viscount Macduff". He attended Eton from 1863 to 1866.

== Political and diplomatic career ==
In 1872, while known as Viscount Macduff, Fife became Lord-Lieutenant of Elginshire in Scotland and continued in the position for thirty years. From 1874 to 1879, he also served as Member of Parliament for Elginshire and Nairnshire, standing as a Liberal. On 7 August 1879, he succeeded his father as 6th Earl Fife in the Peerage of Ireland (and as 2nd Baron Skene in the Peerage of the United Kingdom, thus gaining a seat in the House of Lords). At this time, he also succeeded in a number of Scottish feudal baronies, including MacDuff, which was named for James Duff, 2nd Earl Fife. He served in the Liberal government of William Ewart Gladstone as Captain of the Honourable Corps of Gentlemen-at-Arms from May 1880 to January 1881, and served on a special diplomatic mission to invest the King of Saxony with the Order of the Garter in February 1882. He was appointed Honorary Colonel of the 1st Banffshire Artillery Volunteers on 15 March 1884. In 1885, Queen Victoria created him "Earl of Fife" in the Peerage of the United Kingdom.

Although he had no previous interest in Africa, and no business experience, he took part in the founding in 1889 of the Chartered Company of South Africa (later British South Africa Company) and served as its vice-chairman until the Jameson Raid of 1896, resigning from the company in 1898.

He was Lord Lieutenant of the County of London from February 1900 until his death in 1912.

== Marriage ==
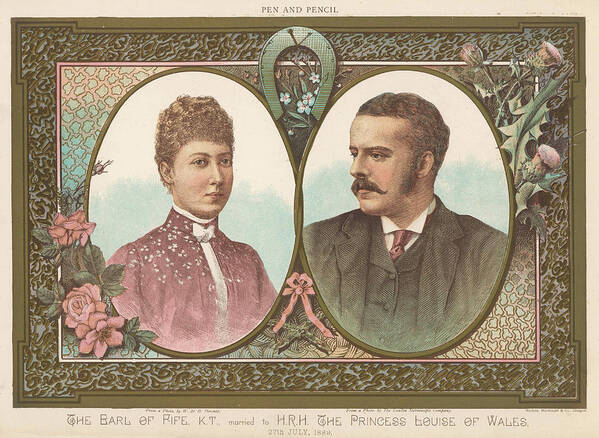
Commemorating the wedding of Princess Louise of Wales and the then-Earl of Fife, from an 1889 issue of Pen and Pencil, an illustrated weekly newspaper

On Saturday 27 July 1889, Lord Fife married Princess Louise, the eldest daughter of the then-Prince and Princess of Wales, at the Private Chapel at Buckingham Palace. The couple were third cousins in descent from George III. The wedding marked the second time a descendant of Queen Victoria married a British subject (the first being the marriage of Princess Louise, the Queen's fourth daughter, to the Duke of Argyll). On the day of the wedding, the Queen elevated Lord Fife to the further dignity of Duke of Fife and Marquess of Macduff, in the County of Banff, in the peerage of the United Kingdom.

The marriage of the Duke of Fife and Princess Louise produced three children:

- Alastair Duff, Marquess of Macduff (stillborn 16 June 1890)
- Princess Alexandra, 2nd Duchess of Fife (17 May 1891 – 26 February 1959); married her first cousin once removed Prince Arthur of Connaught (13 January 1883 – 12 September 1938), and had issue.
- Princess Maud (3 April 1893 – 14 December 1945); married Charles Carnegie, 11th Earl of Southesk, and had issue.

== Death and funeral ==
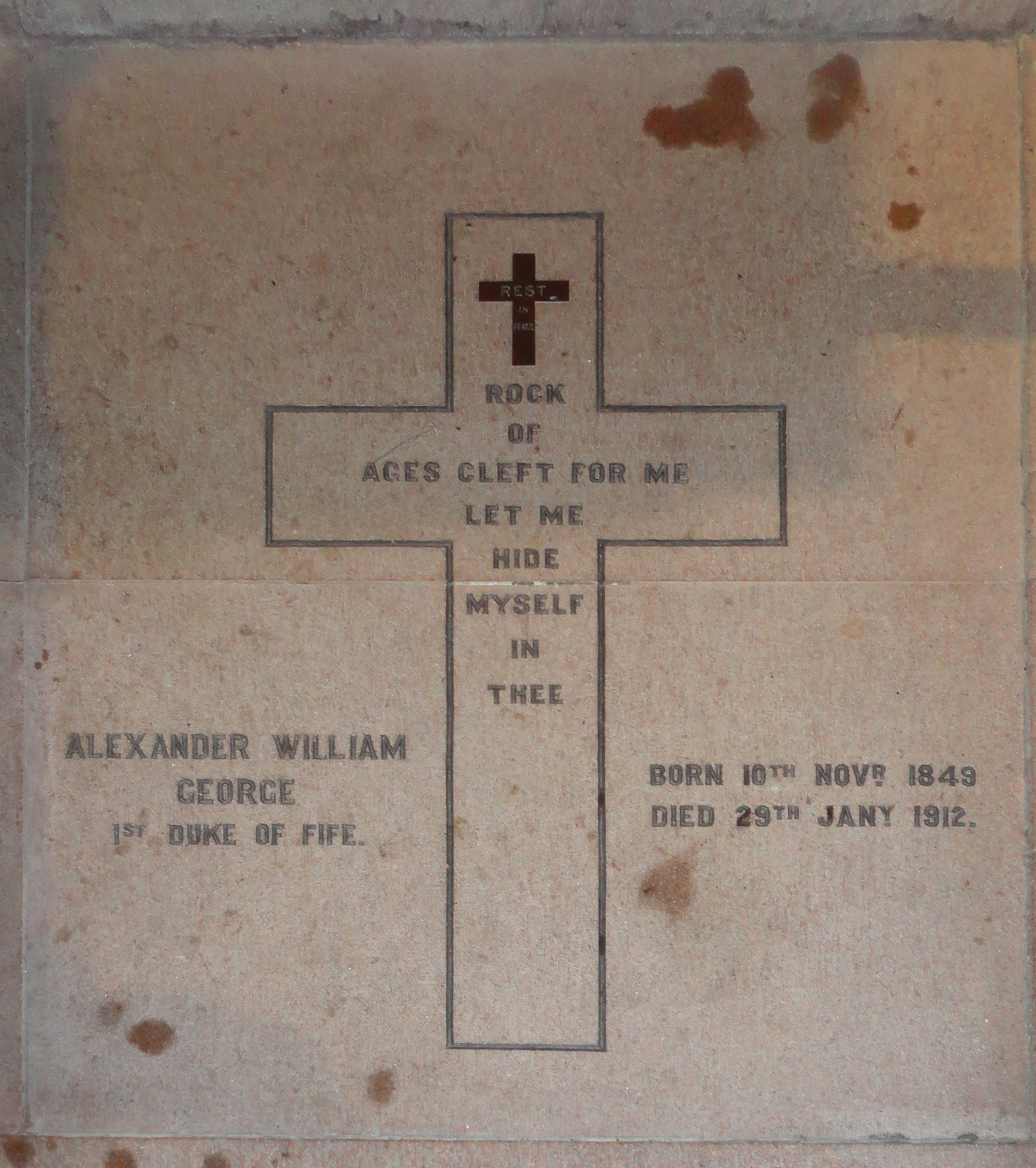
Braemar, Mar Lodge Estate, St Ninian's Chapel - Grave of the 1st Duke of Fife (1849–1912)

In December 1911, while sailing to Egypt on the SS Delhi, the Duke and his family were shipwrecked off the coast of Morocco. They spent some time in the water before being rescued and then had to walk four miles to find accommodation.

He died at Aswan in Egypt on 29 January 1912, and his elder daughter, Princess Alexandra, succeeded to the dukedom of 1900, becoming Duchess of Fife and Countess of Macduff. His other titles, including the dukedom created in 1889, all became extinct.

On his death his estate was valued for probate purposes at £1 million, an amount equivalent to £79.7 million in 2022. He held 249,000 acres.

The Duke's body was brought home to Great Britain by sea, in a lead coffin. It rested in the Royal Vault below St George's Chapel, Windsor Castle, from 28 February 1912 until 6 August 1912, when it was transferred to Scotland for burial in St Ninian's Chapel at Mar Lodge, Braemar, Aberdeenshire.

== Honours ==
Coat of Arms of Alexander Duff, 1st Duke of Fife

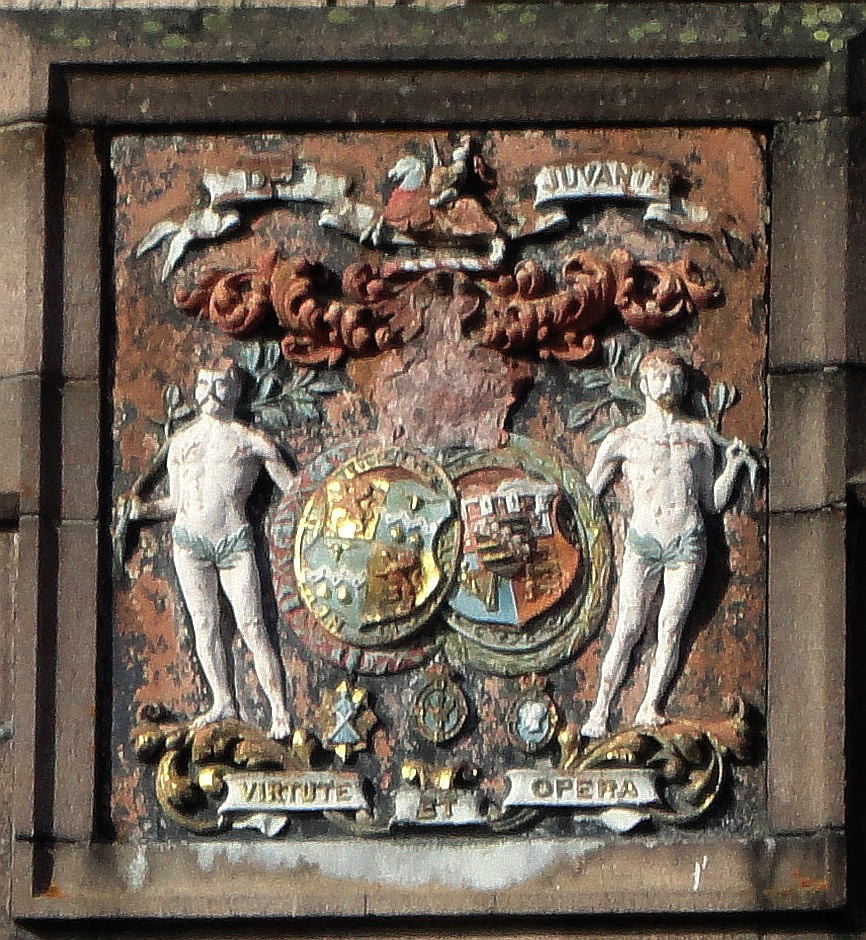
Fife Arms Hotel, Braemar: Arms of the Duke and Duchess of Fife

The Duke of Fife received a new patent as Duke of Fife and Earl of Macduff in the Peerage of the United Kingdom in April 1900, with special remainder to his daughters by Princess Louise and their heirs male. The result was that he held two dukedoms of Fife; the 1889 creation (with the subsidiary Marquessate of Macduff) would become extinct in the absence of a son and the 1900 creation (with the subsidiary Earldom of Macduff) would devolve upon his elder daughter in the absence of a son. In November 1905, his father-in-law, now King Edward VII, bestowed the title Princess Royal on the Duchess of Fife and declared that Lady Alexandra Duff and Lady Maud Duff should henceforth hold the title of Princess of Great Britain and Ireland with the style Highness.

Queen Victoria created the future Duke of Fife a Knight of the Thistle; George V created him an Extra Knight Companion of the Garter. He was also sworn a Privy Counsellor in 1880. At the coronation of his father-in-law, King Edward VII, in August 1902, and again at his brother-in-law King George V's coronation in June 1911, the Duke of Fife acted as Lord High Constable. In addition to his London residence, 15 Portman Square, the Duke owned two estates in Scotland: Mar Lodge, Aberdeenshire, and Mountcoffer House, Banff.

=== Orders and decorations ===
- United Kingdom:
  - Knight of the Most Ancient and Most Noble Order of the Thistle (KT), 24 March 1881
  - Knight Grand Cross of the Royal Victorian Order (GCVO), 2 February 1901
  - Recipient of the Royal Victorian Chain, 11 August 1902
  - Recipient of the Decoration for Officers of the Royal Naval Volunteer Reserve (VD), 1904
  - Knight Companion of the Most Noble Order of the Garter (KG), 19 June 1911
- Norway: Knight Grand Cross of the Royal Norwegian Order of Saint Olav, with Collar, 13 November 1906
- Kingdom of Saxony: Knight of the House Order of the Rue Crown, 1882

Parliament of the United Kingdom
Preceded by James Ogilvy-Grant	Member of Parliament for Elginshire & Nairnshire; 1874 – 1879	Succeeded by Sir George Macpherson-Grant, Bt
Political offices
Preceded by The Earl of Coventry	Captain of the Gentlemen at Arms; 1880–1881	Succeeded by The Marquess of Huntly
Honorary titles
Preceded by George Skene Duff	Lord Lieutenant of Elginshire; 1872–1902	Succeeded by Earl of March and Kinrara
Preceded by The Duke of Westminster	Lord Lieutenant of the County of London; 1900–1912	Succeeded by The Marquess of Crewe
Peerage of the United Kingdom
New creation	Duke of Fife; 1900–1912	Succeeded by Princess Alexandra
Peerage of Ireland
Preceded by James Duff	Earl Fife; 1879–1912	Extinct
