= James Duff, 4th Earl Fife =

Scottish nobleman who became a Spanish general

The Right Honourable The Earl Fife KT GCH
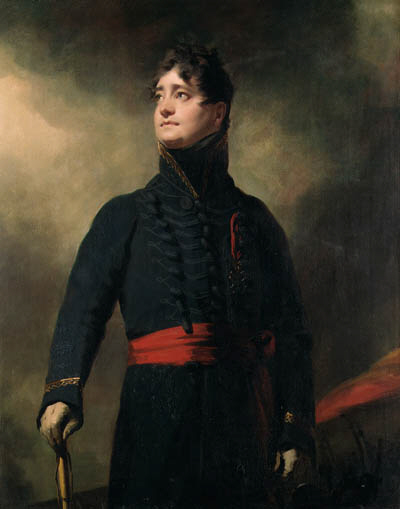
- Born: 1776
- Died: 1857 (aged 80–81)
- Occupation: Military officer
- Spouse: Mary Caroline Manners (m. 1799; died 1805)
- Parents: Alexander Duff, 3rd Earl Fife; Mary Skene

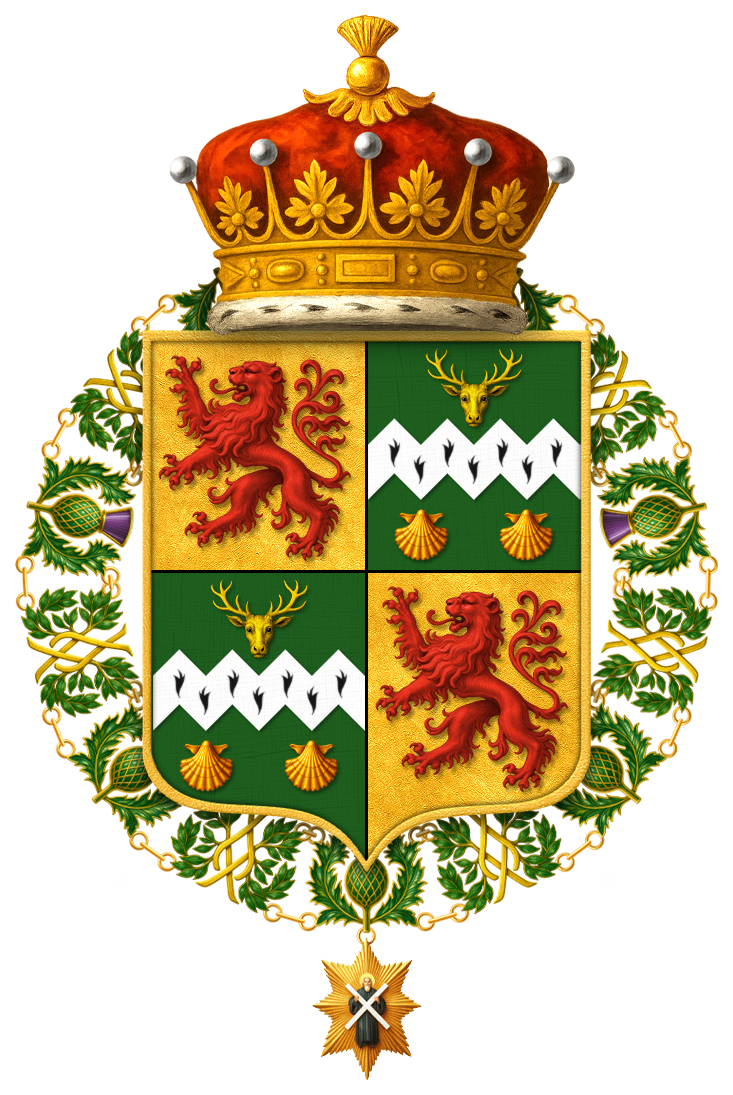
Shield of Arms of James Duff, 4th Earl Fife, KT, GCH

James Duff, 4th Earl Fife KT GCH (6 October 1776 – 9 March 1857) was a Scottish nobleman who became a Spanish general.

== Biography ==
James was the elder son of the Hon. Alexander Duff, who succeeded his brother as third Earl Fife in 1809. He was educated at Edinburgh and was not intended for the army.

On 9 September 1799 he married Mary Caroline Manners (second daughter of John Manners and Louisa Tollemache, 7th Countess of Dysart), who died on 20 December 1805 without children. Thereupon Duff sought distraction in 1808 by volunteering to join the Spaniards in their war against Napoleon. His assistance was gladly received, especially as he came full of enthusiasm and with a full purse, and he was made a major-general in the Spanish service.

He served with great distinction at the Battle of Talavera, where he was severely wounded in trying to rally the Spanish runaways, and was only saved from becoming a prisoner by the gallantry of his lifelong friend, Major (afterwards Lieutenant-general Sir) S. F. Whittingham. In that year, 1809, he became Viscount Macduff on his father's accession to the Irish earldom of Fife, but he still continued to serve in Spain, and was present during the defence of Cadiz against Marshal Victor, and was again severely wounded in the attack on Fort Matagorda in 1810. On 17 April 1811 he succeeded his father as fourth Earl Fife less than 2 years after his father himself had succeeded, and also as Lord Lieutenant of Banffshire, and as a baron to many minor baronies including Macduff, named for James Duff, 2nd Earl Fife by a Crown Charter granted by King George III in 1783. He returned to Britain, after being made for his services a knight of the order of St. Ferdinand. He was elected M.P. for Banffshire in 1818, and made a lord in waiting in the following year.

He was created Baron Fife in the Peerage of the United Kingdom on 27 April 1827, in which year he was also made a knight of the Thistle. He soon afterwards retired altogether to Scotland, where he lived at Duff House, Banffshire, much beloved by his tenantry and greatly interested in farming and cattle raising; he died there, aged 80, on 9 March 1857.

His influence was instrumental in the passage of José de San Martín (a Spanish captain at this time) to South America in 1812, who would liberate Argentina, Chile and Perú from Spanish rule. In 1824, the General José de San Martín (today, the national hero of Argentina and Perú) visited him at Duff House (see external link below).

He was succeeded by his nephew, James Duff, the elder son of James Duff's only brother, General the Hon. Sir Alexander Duff, who commanded the 88th regiment, the Connaught Rangers, from 1798 to 1810.

Duff founded the burgh of Dufftown, named after him, in 1817. The town was established to help develop the Earl's estate and provide both housing and employment for soldiers returning home from the Napoleonic War.

== Notes ==
=== References ===
Attribution

- This article incorporates text from a publication now in the public domain: Stephens, Henry Morse (1888). "Duff, James (1776-1857)". In Stephen, Leslie (ed.). Dictionary of National Biography. Vol. 16. London: Smith, Elder & Co. pp. 129–130. Endnotes:
  - Whittingham's Life of Sir S. F. Whittingham
  - Gentlemen's Magazine April 1857
  - Royal Military Calendar, ed. 1820, iii. 169. for Sir Alexander Duff's military services

Parliament of the United Kingdom
Preceded by Robert Abercromby	Member of Parliament for Banffshire; 1818 – 1827	Succeeded by John Morison
Masonic offices
Preceded by The Viscount Duncan	Grand Master of the Grand Lodge of Scotland; 1814–1816	Succeeded by Sir John Majoribanks, Bt
Honorary titles
Preceded by In Commission	Lord Lieutenant of Banffshire; 1813–1856	Succeeded by James Duff
Peerage of Ireland
Preceded by Alexander Duff	Earl Fife; 1811–1857	Succeeded by James Duff
Peerage of the United Kingdom
New creation	Baron Fife; 2nd creation 1827–1857	Extinct
