= James Abercrombie (British Army officer, born 1706) =

British Army officer and politician (1706–1781)

General James Abercrombie
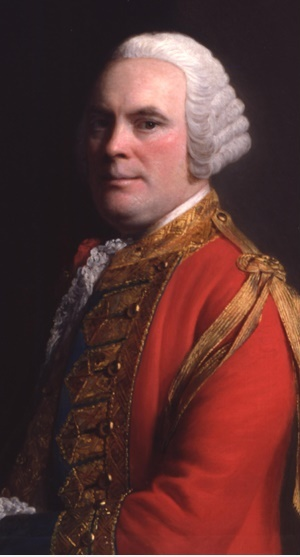
- Portrait by Allan Ramsay, c. 1759
- Born: 1706; Glassaugh, Banffshire
- Died: 23 April 1781 (aged 74–75); Stirling, Stirlingshire
- Military career
- Allegiance: Great Britain
- Branch: British Army
- Service years: 1717–1772
- Rank: General
- Conflicts: War of the Austrian Succession; Seven Years' War; French and Indian War; Battle of Fort Ticonderoga

General James Abercrombie (1706 – 23 April 1781) was a British Army officer and Whig politician who represented Banffshire in the House of Commons of Great Britain from 1734 to 1754. He served as Commander-in-Chief, North America during the French and Indian War, and is best known for commanding the British defeat in the 1758 Battle of Carillon.

== Biography ==
Abercrombie was born in Glassaugh, Banffshire, Scotland, the eldest son of Alexander Abercromby, also MP for Banffshire, and his wife Helen Meldrum. He was appointed an ensign in the 25th Regiment of Foot at age eleven. He married Mary Duff (sister of William Duff, 1st Earl Fife) and they had one daughter. At the 1734 British general election, he was returned by his brother-in-law, William Duff, later Lord Braco, as Member of Parliament for Banffshire. He voted regularly with the Government.

Abercrombie was promoted to captain in 1736, and by 1739 was lieutenant-governor of Stirling castle. He was re-elected MP for Banff at the 1741 British general election. In 1742, he purchased a major commission. He was promoted to colonel in 1746 and served in the Flemish Campaign of the War of Austrian Succession. He was quartermaster general under General James St Clair at the Raid on Lorient in 1746 and was wounded at Hulst in 1747. At the 1747 British general election, he was returned unopposed as MP for Banff as an Old Whig, but stood down in 1754 in favour of Lord Braco's son, now of age.

With the outbreak of the Seven Years' War in 1756, Abercrombie was promoted Major General and ordered to America as second in command to Lord Loudoun for the upcoming campaigns against the French. Abercrombie commanded a brigade at Louisbourg in 1757 and became Commander-in-Chief of the British forces in North America after Loudoun's departure in December.

In the summer of 1757, Abercrombie was ordered to lead an expedition against Fort Carillon (later known as Fort Ticonderoga), to prepare to take Montreal. Abercrombie was a genius at organization but vacillated in his leadership to the point where, after his defeat, he was called Mrs. Nanny Cromby. He managed the remarkable feat of assembling fifteen thousand troops at Fort Edward and moving them and their supplies through the wilderness. Then, after losing George Howe, 3rd Viscount Howe, his second-in-command, in a skirmish on 7 July while reconnoitring, he directed his troops on 8 July into a frontal assault on a fortified French position, without the benefit of artillery support. More than two thousand men were killed or wounded. Eventually his force panicked and fled, and he retreated to his fortified camp south of Lake George.

This disaster caused in September 1758 Abercrombie's recall to Great Britain and his replacement by General Jeffery Amherst. Despite his failure, he was promoted to lieutenant general in 1760, and general in 1772.

== See also ==
- James Abercrombie (British Army officer, born 1732)

Parliament of Great Britain
Preceded by William Duff	Member of Parliament for Banffshire; 1734–1754	Succeeded by James Duff
Military offices
Preceded by The Earl of Loudoun	Commander-in-Chief, North America; 1757–1758	Succeeded by The Lord Amherst
Military offices
Preceded by Robert Ellison	Colonel, 44th Foot; 1756–1781	Succeeded by Charles Rainsford
