= Alexander Duff (British Army officer) =

British Army officer

General Sir Alexander Duff GCH (1777 – 21 March 1851) was a British Army officer of the Napoleonic era.

== Early life ==
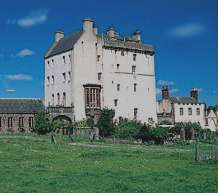
Delgatie Castle

Duff was the second son of Alexander Duff, 3rd Earl Fife and Mary Skene, daughter of George Skene, 18th of Skene. His elder brother was James Duff, 4th Earl Fife.

His paternal grandparents were William Duff, 1st Earl Fife, and, his second wife, Jean Grant (a daughter of Sir James Grant, 6th Baronet). His uncle was James Duff, 2nd Earl Fife.

== Career ==
In 1793, he was commissioned an ensign in the 66th Regiment of Foot, and served at Gibraltar, in Flanders, in the East Indies in 1798, and under Baird during the invasion of Egypt. In 1806, Duff commanded the centre column in the attack on Buenos Aires.

He was appointed colonel of the 92nd Regiment of Foot in 1823, transferring to 37th Regiment of Foot in 1831. He was made GCH and knighted in 1834, and was promoted full general on 28 June 1838.

=== Political career ===
He was elected the Member of Parliament for Elgin Burghs, sitting from 1826 to 1831. From 1848 until his death he was Lord Lieutenant of Elginshire, and a deputy lieutenant of Banffshire.

== Personal life ==
Duff lived at Delgatie Castle near Turriff, Aberdeenshire. He had married Anne Stein, daughter of James Stein of Kilbagie and Kennetpans House and sister to John Stein, MP for Bletchingley. by whom he had two sons and two daughters, including:

- James Duff, 5th Earl Fife (1814–1879), who married Lady Agnes Georgiana Elizabeth Hay, daughter of William Hay, 18th Earl of Erroll and Lady Elizabeth FitzClarence (an illegitimate daughter of William IV).
- George Skene Duff (1816–1889), an MP for Elgin Burghs.
- Catherine Duff (c. 1820–1869), who married John Lewis Ricardo, MP for Stoke-upon-Trent, and nephew of economist David Ricardo, in 1841.

He died at Percy Cross, Walham Green, Fulham, Middlesex in March 1851.

=== Freemasonry ===
He was Initiated into Scottish Freemasonry in Lodge Holyrood House (St Luke's), No.44, on 30 November 1812.

Parliament of the United Kingdom
Preceded by Archibald Farquharson	Member of Parliament for Elgin Burghs; 1826–1831	Succeeded by Sir William Gordon-Cumming
Military offices
Preceded by Sir Charles Green	Colonel of the 37th (North Hampshire) Regiment of Foot; 1831–1851	Succeeded by William Smelt
Preceded by John Hope	Colonel of the 92nd Regiment of Foot; 1823–1831	Succeeded by John Dalrymple, 8th Earl of Stair
Honorary titles
Preceded by The Earl of Moray	Lord Lieutenant of Elginshire; 1848–1851	Succeeded by James Duff
