= Alexander Duff, 3rd Earl Fife =

Scottish nobleman

The Right Honourable The Earl Fife
- Born: Alexander Duff; 18 April 1731
- Died: 17 April 1811 (aged 79); Duff House, Banff, Scotland
- Spouse: Mary Skene (m. 1775; died 1790)
- Children: 6, including James, Alexander
- Parent(s): William Duff, 1st Earl Fife; Jean Grant
- Relatives: James Duff, 2nd Earl Fife (brother)

Alexander Duff, 3rd Earl Fife (18 April 1731 – 17 April 1811) was a Scottish nobleman.

== Early life ==
Duff was born on 18 April 1731. He was a son of William Duff, 1st Earl Fife, and, his second wife, Jean Grant. Among his siblings were brothers James Duff, 2nd Earl Fife and Arthur Duff, MP for Elginshire. His sister, Hon. Helen Duff, married their father's cousin, Vice-Admiral Robert Duff. Before his parents' marriage, his father was married to Lady Janet Ogilvy (a daughter of the 4th Earl of Findlater).

His paternal grandparents were merchant William Duff of Braco and the former Helen Gordon (a daughter of Sir George Gordon, Shire Commissioner in the Parliament of Scotland). His maternal grandparents were Sir James Grant, 6th Baronet and the former Anne Colquhoun (a daughter of Sir Humphrey Colquhoun, 5th Baronet).

== Career ==
Upon the death of his elder brother, James, in 1809, he succeeded to the title of Earl Fife. In addition to that title, he succeeded as the 3rd Viscount MacDuff and the 2nd Baron of MacDuff.

== Personal life ==
On 17 August 1775 he married Mary Skene (1754–1790), daughter of George Skene, 18th of Skene, at Carriston, Angus. Together, they were the parents of two sons and four daughters, including:

- James Duff, 4th Earl Fife (1776–1857), who married Lady Maria Manners, daughter of John Manners and Louisa Tollemache, 7th Countess of Dysart, in 1799.
- The Hon. Alexander Duff (c. 1778–1851), who married Anne Stein, daughter of James Stein and sister to John Stein, MP for Bletchingley.
- Lady Jane Duff (1780–1850), who married Maj. Alexander Francis Tayler in 1802.
- Lady Anne Duff (d. 1829), who married her cousin, Richard Wharton Duff (who inherited Orton House from their Arthur Duff), in 1809.
- Lady Sarah Duff (d. 1811), who married Daniel Collyer in 1807.

Lord Fife died on 17 April 1811 at Duff House in Banff. He was succeeded by his eldest son, James.

=== Descendants ===
Through his second son, Alexander, he was a grandfather of James Duff, 5th Earl Fife, who married Lady Agnes Georgiana Elizabeth Hay (a daughter of William Hay, 18th Earl of Erroll and Lady Elizabeth FitzClarence, an illegitimate daughter of King William IV), and George Skene Duff, an MP for Elgin Burghs.

Peerage of Ireland
Preceded by James Duff	Earl Fife; 1809–1811	Succeeded by James Duff
