= Mar Lodge =

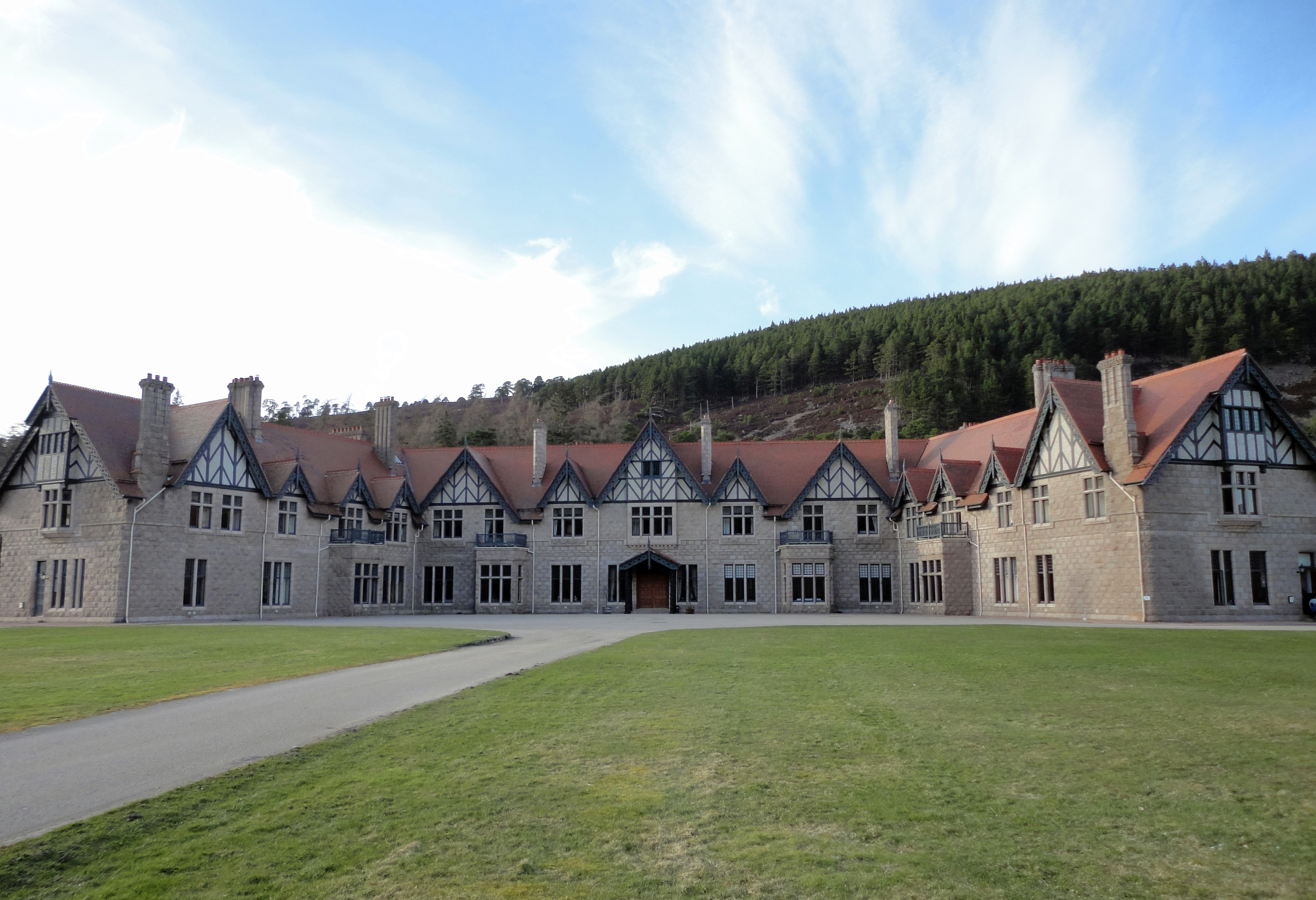
- The front elevation of Mar Lodge during 2015
- Interactive map of the Mar Lodge area

General information
- Status: Completed
- Type: Events venue and holiday accommodation
- Architectural style: Highland with elements of Tudor Revival
- Location: Mar Lodge Estate; Braemar; Aberdeenshire; AB35 5YJ, Scotland
- Coordinates: 56°59′30″N 3°29′19″W
- Construction started: 1895
- Completed: 1898; 128 years ago
- Renovated: 1991–1993 (after fire)
- Owner: National Trust for Scotland

Technical details
- Material: Granite, timber detailing, roof tiles
- Floor count: Two

Design and construction
- Architect: Alexander Marshall Mackenzie
- Developer: Duke and Duchess of Fife

Website
- Official website

Listed Building – Category B
- Official name: Mar Lodge Estate, Mar Lodge including garden wall
- Designated: 24 November 1972
- Reference no.: LB48775

Mar Lodge is a sporting lodge 5 miles (8 kilometres) to the west of Braemar and the principal building on the Mar Lodge Estate in Aberdeenshire, Scotland. It was built in 1895, replacing an earlier building, by Alexander Duff, 1st Duke of Fife.

== Location ==
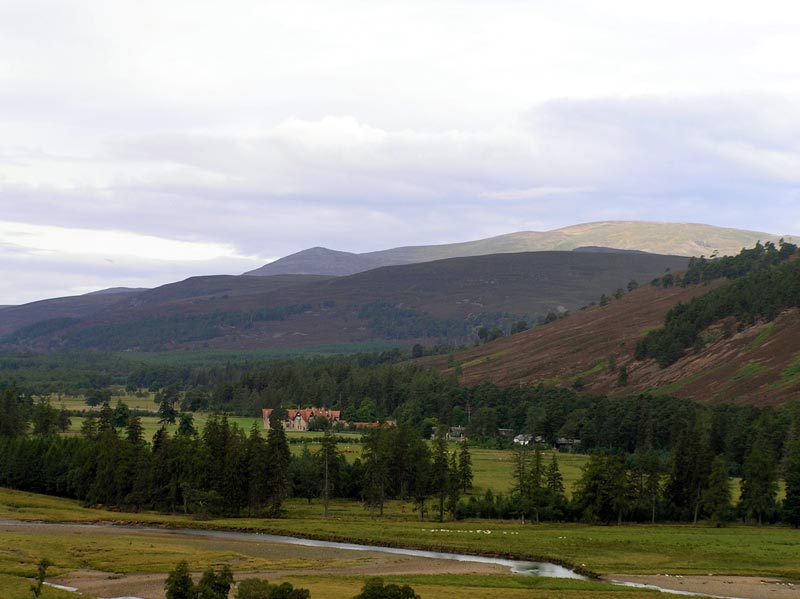
Mar Lodge from Linn of Dee Road

Mar Lodge is a sporting lodge built for the use of the Duke and Duchess of Fife. It is located about 4 miles (6 kilometres) to the west of Braemar and is accessed from the Linn of Dee road, over the Victoria Bridge, a lattice girder structure built across the River Dee in 1905.

== History ==
There have been three buildings known as Mar Lodge. The first, originally known as Dalmore House, was built in the 18th century by William Duff, Baron Braco, close to the site of the present Lodge. Lord Braco had acquired the Dalmore estate some time between 1730 and 1737 from the Mackenzie lairds of Dalmore, and by the end of the 18th century the Duff family also owned the lands of Allanaquoich, Auchindryne and Inverey The Duffs owned huge swaths of land in addition to the estate as the heads of many Scottish Feudal Baronies, including MacDuff, named for James Duff, 2nd Earl Fife. The building was damaged in the "Muckle Spate" ("great flood") of 1829, and later demolished. The lodges served as the seat for the 5th-7th Barons of MacDuff.

=== Corriemulzie Cottage ===
The 2nd Mar Lodge, colloquially known as Corriemulzie Cottage or 'New' Mar Lodge, was built near Linn of Corriemulzie at the top of Mar Lodge Brae. It was a very 'Victorian' building with architectural detailing such as prominent use of lattice work (still visible on the 'Stag Ballroom') and tree-trunk supports (visible in the veranda of the old bar at the rear of Mar Lodge) being reused in the construction of the next Mar Lodge. It was destroyed by fire on the 14th of June 1895.

=== The present lodge ===
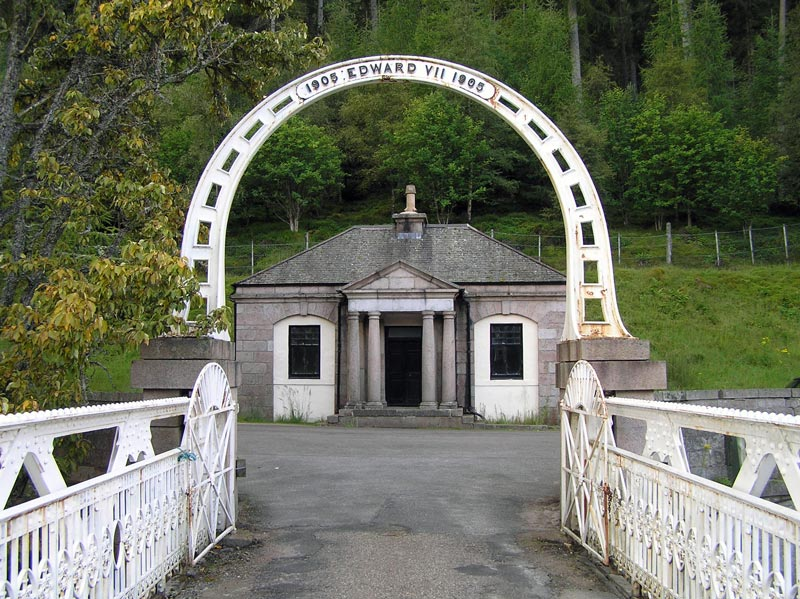
The Mar Lodge Gatehouse, as seen from Victoria Bridge

The 3rd Mar Lodge was built between 1895 and 1898 for the Alexander Duff, 1st Duke of Fife and his wife Princess Louise, Princess Royal and Duchess of Fife. The foundation stone was laid by her grandmother Queen Victoria on 15 October 1895.

The architect was Alexander Marshall Mackenzie of Aberdeen (1848-1933) who, at the express request of the Duchess—H.R.H. Princess Louise, in the Elizabethan style of architecture.

— Wyness, Fenton

An old postcard shows the original veranda and drive alignment that allowed horse-drawn carriages arriving from Braemar to pull up at the main door.

The 3rd Mar Lodge was extensively damaged by a fire while being renovated in 1991, but was rebuilt. It was converted into holiday flats and retains many of the grand features of its heyday as a hunting lodge. The ballroom has 2,435 red deer stags heads lining the walls and ceiling.

Mar Lodge Estate became a National Trust for Scotland property in 1995.

== Stag Ballroom ==
A ballroom was constructed for estate staff balls, required by the need for segregation between master and servant which dominated the period. Built near to the second Mar Lodge at Corriemulzie, it was moved to the present site in 1898. A large timber building in the estate red, it has distinctive lattice trellising, an original Victorian ventilation system and unusual cast iron bracers on stone plinths supporting the walls. Internally the building remains virtually in its original state and contains over 2,000 stags skulls.

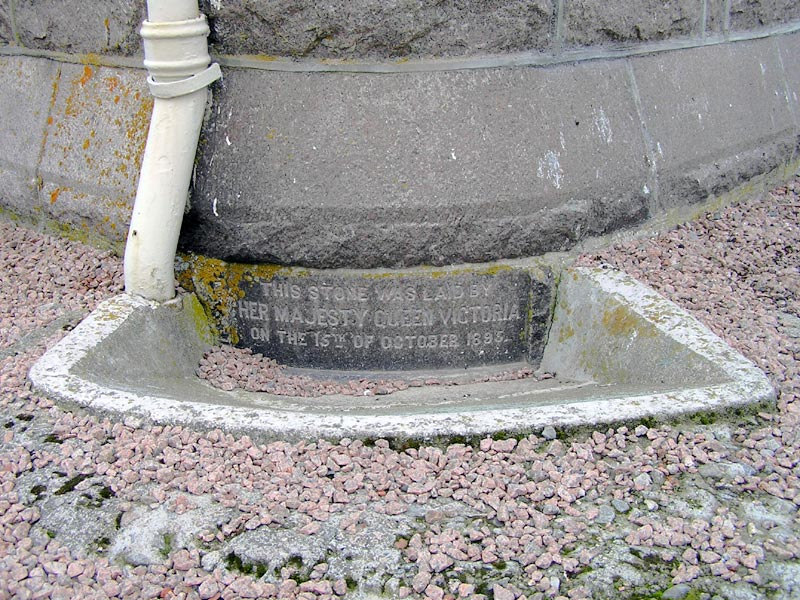
The foundation stone

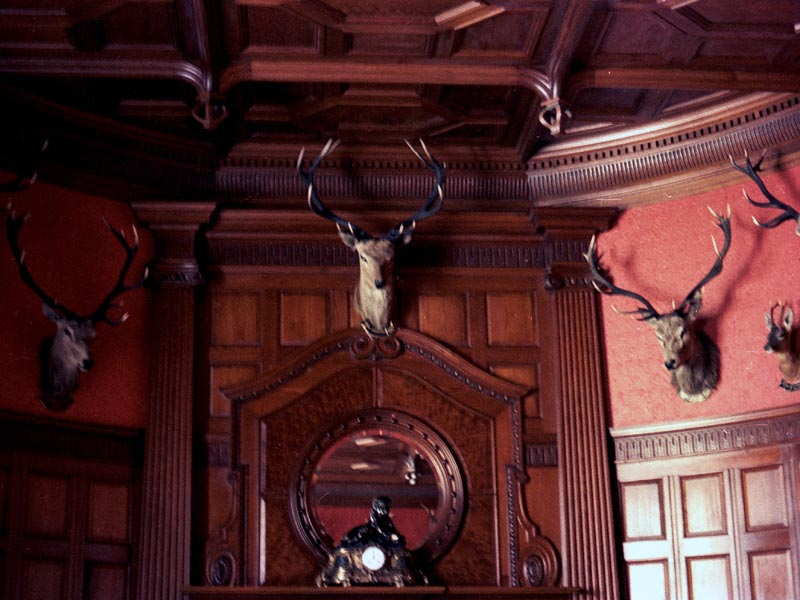
Interior of Mar Lodge

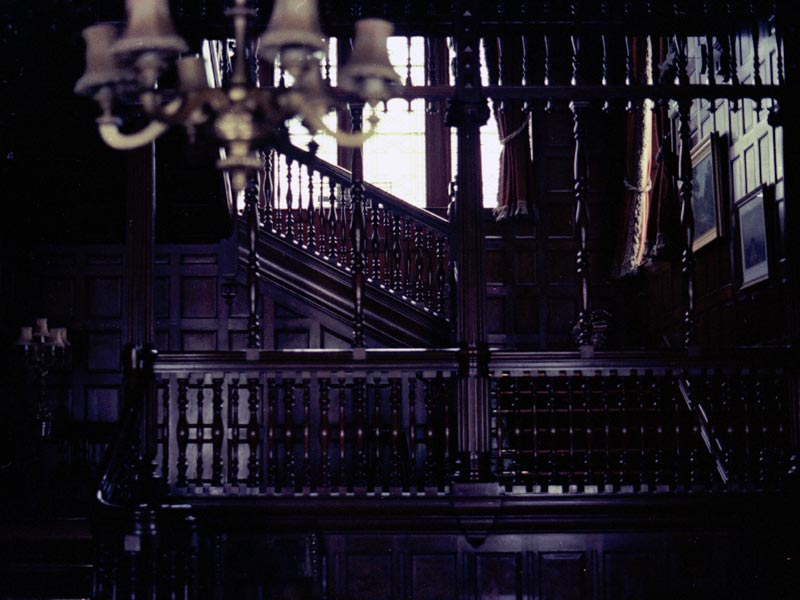
Interior of Mar Lodge

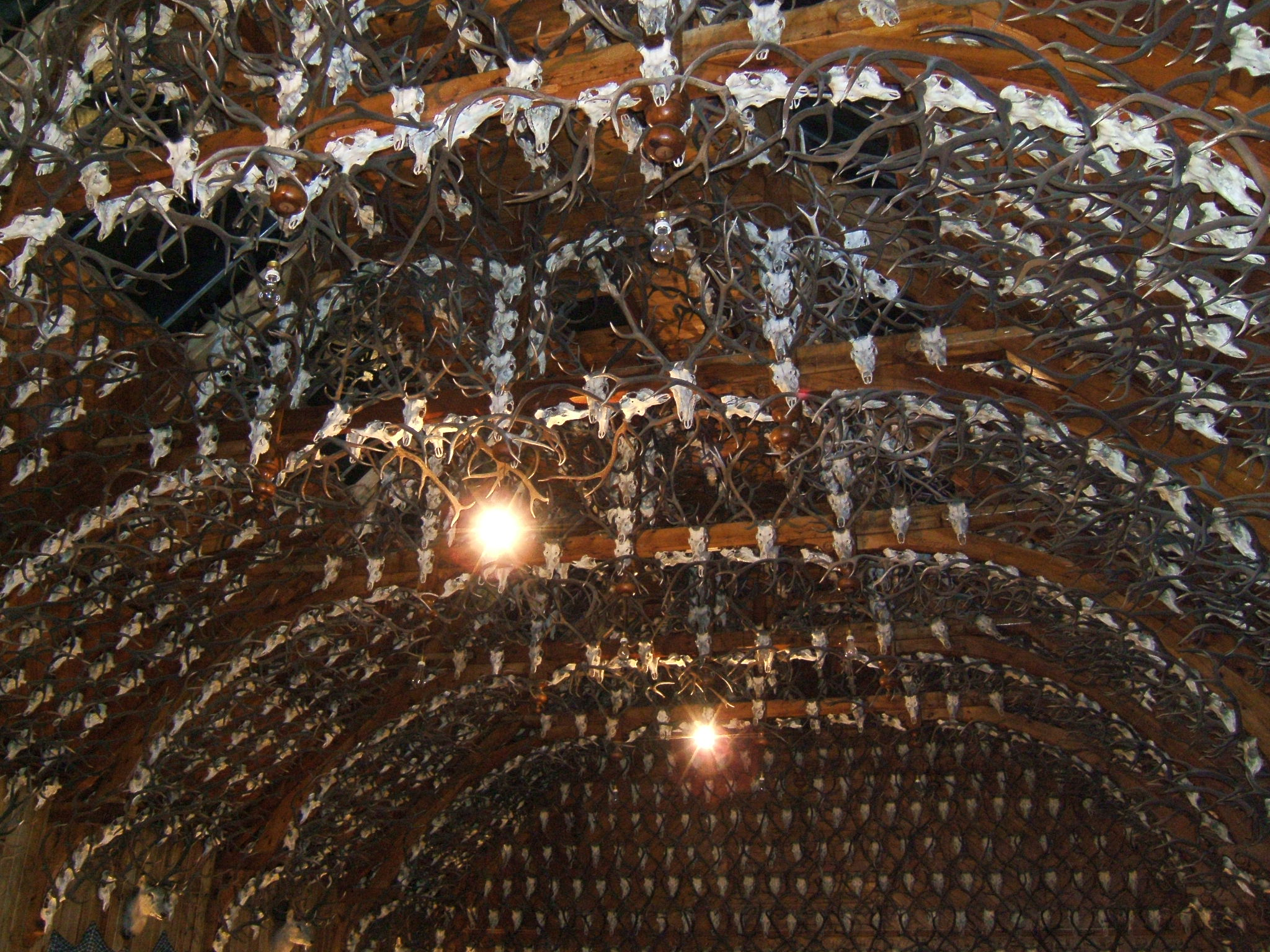
Ballroom with thousands of antlers

== St Ninian's Chapel ==
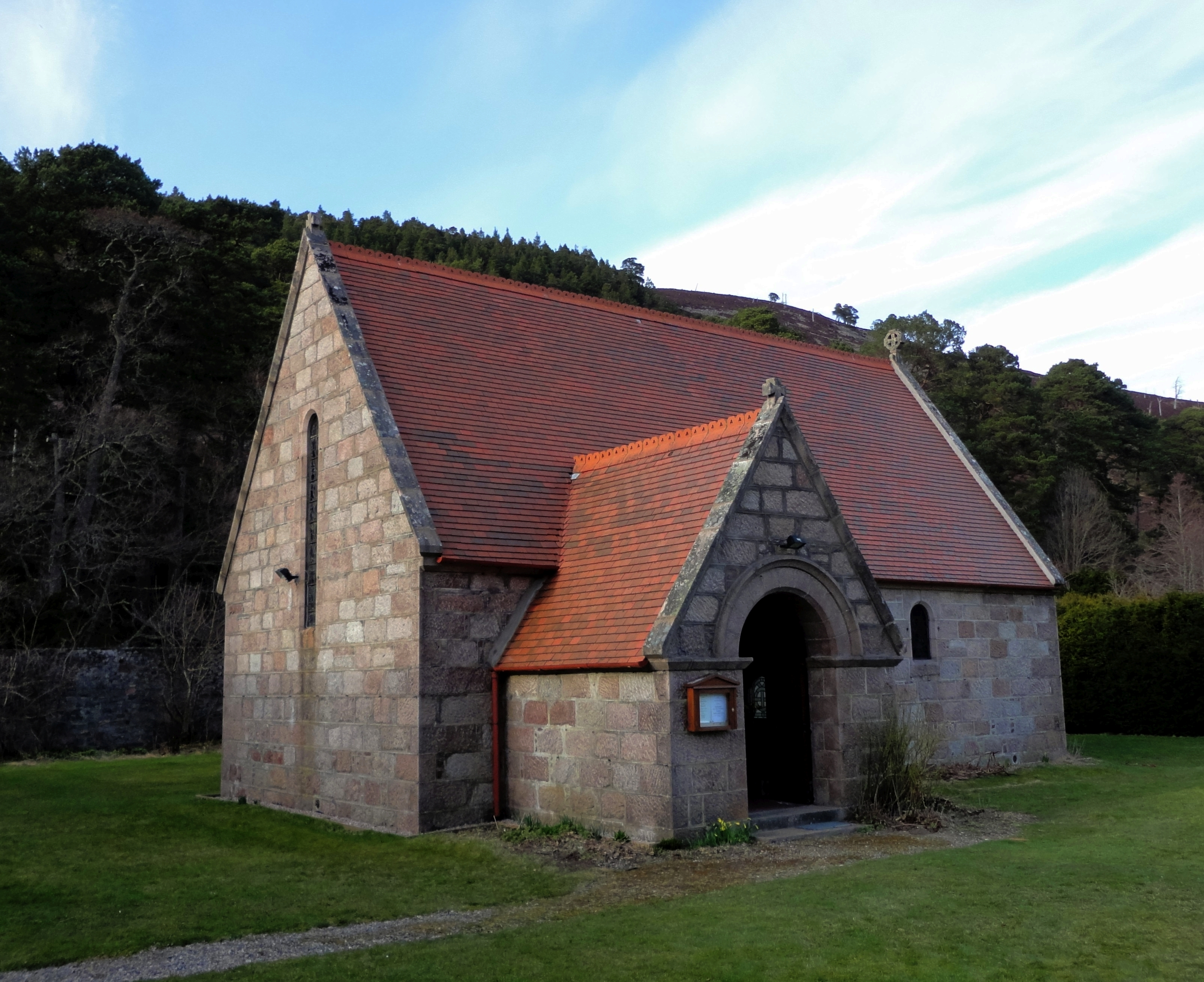
St Ninian's Chapel

St Ninian's Chapel stands immediately adjacent to Mar Lodge and was originally the private chapel of the owners of Mar Lodge. The 1st Duke of Fife and his family are buried in the chapel.

== Sources ==
- Wyness, Fenton (1968), Royal Valley : The Story Of The Aberdeenshire Dee, Alex P. Reid & Son, Aberdeen
- Dixon, P.J.; Green, S.T. (1995), Mar Lodge Estate Grampian : An Archaeological Survey, Royal Commission on the Ancient and Historical Monuments of Scotland, Edinburgh

== See also ==
- Places, place names, and structures on Mar Lodge Estate
