= Arthur Duff =

Arthur Duff may refer to:

- Arthur Duff (composer) (1899–1956), Irish composer and conductor
- Arthur Duff (cricketer) (1883–?), Jamaican cricketer
- Arthur Duff (MP) (1743–1805), Scottish MP for Elginshire
- Sir Arthur Duff (Royal Navy officer) (1874–1952), British Royal Navy admiral
- Sir Arthur Grant Duff (1861–1948), British diplomat
- Sir Arthur Antony Duff (1920–2000), British diplomat and director general of MI5
