= Arthur's Bridge =

Bridge in Moray, Scotland

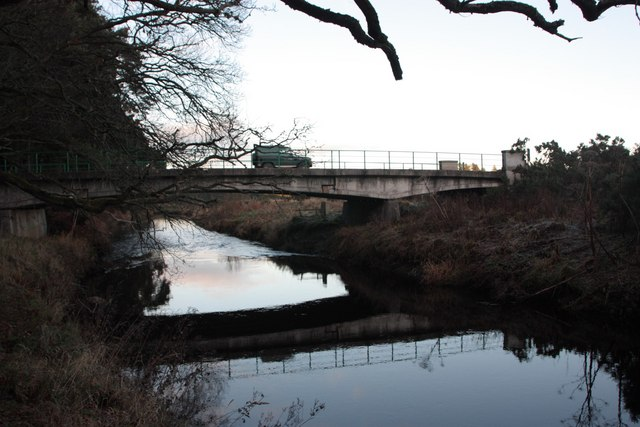
- The current, 1970s, Arthur's Bridge
- Coordinates: 57°41′18.56″N 3°15′14.48″W
- Carries: B9103
- Crosses: River Lossie
- Locale: Moray

History
- Opened: 1852 (1st bridge); 1884 (2nd bridge); 1970 (present bridge)

Location
- Interactive map of Arthur's Bridge

Arthur's Bridge is a road bridge in Moray, Scotland which carries the B9103 road across the River Lossie.

== History ==
The first bridge in this location was opened free of pontage in May 1852. It was named Arthur's Bridge after Arthur Duff, who planted the larches that provided timber for the bridge. The wooden structure had three arches and was approximately 160 feet (49 metres) long and 12 feet (3.7 metres) wide.

In September 1884, the original structure was closed to traffic. In December 1884, a replacement bridge with a lattice structure was opened.

The present bridge was built in 1970.

In recent years, the bridge has had a weight restriction. In 2020, it was reduced from 26 tonnes to 7.5 tonnes. Moray Council stated that an inspection had found defective joints in the structure, which had been significantly weakened by HGVs using it illegally. Traffic lights have also been installed with only one direction of traffic allowed to use the bridge at a time. A replacement bridge, estimated to cost £7.1 million, was expected to be required by 2027-28, but in 2021 the council stated that this date had been brought forward by three years.

== See also ==
- List of bridges in Scotland
