= Lord Lieutenant of Banffshire =

Ceremonial officer in Banffshire, Scotland

This is a list of people who have served as Lord Lieutenant of Banffshire, Scotland.

- James Duff, 2nd Earl Fife 17 March 1794 – 24 January 1809
- In commission 1809–1813
  - Sir George Abercromby, 4th Baron Abercromby
  - Francis Garden Campbell
  - Stewart Souler
- James Duff, 4th Earl Fife 8 June 1813 – 1856
- James Duff, 5th Earl Fife 17 March 1856 – 7 August 1879
- Charles Henry Gordon-Lennox, 6th Duke of Richmond 22 August 1879 – 27 September 1903
- Charles Henry Gordon-Lennox, 7th Duke of Richmond 16 November 1903 – 18 January 1928
- Sir John Ritchie Findlay, 1st Baronet 11 April 1928 – 13 April 1930
- James Archibald 19 July 1930 – 8 September 1946
- Sir George William Abercromby, 8th Baronet 21 December 1946 – 9 September 1964
- Col. Thomas Robert Gordon-Duff, 15 January 1965 – 1987 †
- James Alexander Strachan McPherson 11 December 1987 – 2002 †
- Clare Nancy Russell, Lady Ballindalloch 19 February 2003 – 4 August 2019
- Christopher Andrew Crawford Simpson 4 August 2019 – current ‡

† Known as Lord-Lieutenant of the County of Banff in Grampian Region 1975–1996.

‡ Website of the Lieutenancy of Banffshire

== Deputy Lieutenants ==
Deputy Lieutenants traditionally supported the Lord-Lieutenant. There could be several deputy lieutenants at any time, depending on the population of the county. Their appointment did not terminate with the changing of the Lord-Lieutenant, but they often retired at age 75.

- George Stephen, 1st Baron Mount Stephen 29 April 1901
- Jim Walker and Andrew Simpson until 14 January 2020
- Frances McKay and Patricia Lawson from 14 January 2020
- Alan McIntosh
- Charles Milne

== Notes and references ==
- Sainty, J. C. "Lieutenants and Lord-Lieutenants of Counties (Scotland) 1794-".
