= James Abercrombie (British Army officer, born 1732) =

British Army officer

- Born: 1 January 1732; Scotland
- Died: 23 June 1775 (aged 43); Boston, Massachusetts
- Burial place: King's Chapel Burying Ground
- Relatives: James Abercrombie (father); Mary Duff (mother); Ralph Abercrombie (brother)
- Military career
- Allegiance: Great Britain
- Branch: British Army
- Service years: 1744–1775
- Rank: Lieutenant colonel
- Commands: 1st Regiment of Foot; 42nd Regiment of Foot; 22nd Regiment of Foot
- Conflicts: War of the Austrian Succession; Jacobite rising of 1745; French and Indian War; Battle of Carillon; American War of Independence; Battle of Bunker Hill (DOW)

Lieutenant-Colonel James Abercrombie (1 January 1732 – 23 June 1775) was a British Army officer who died during the American War of Independence.

== Family ==
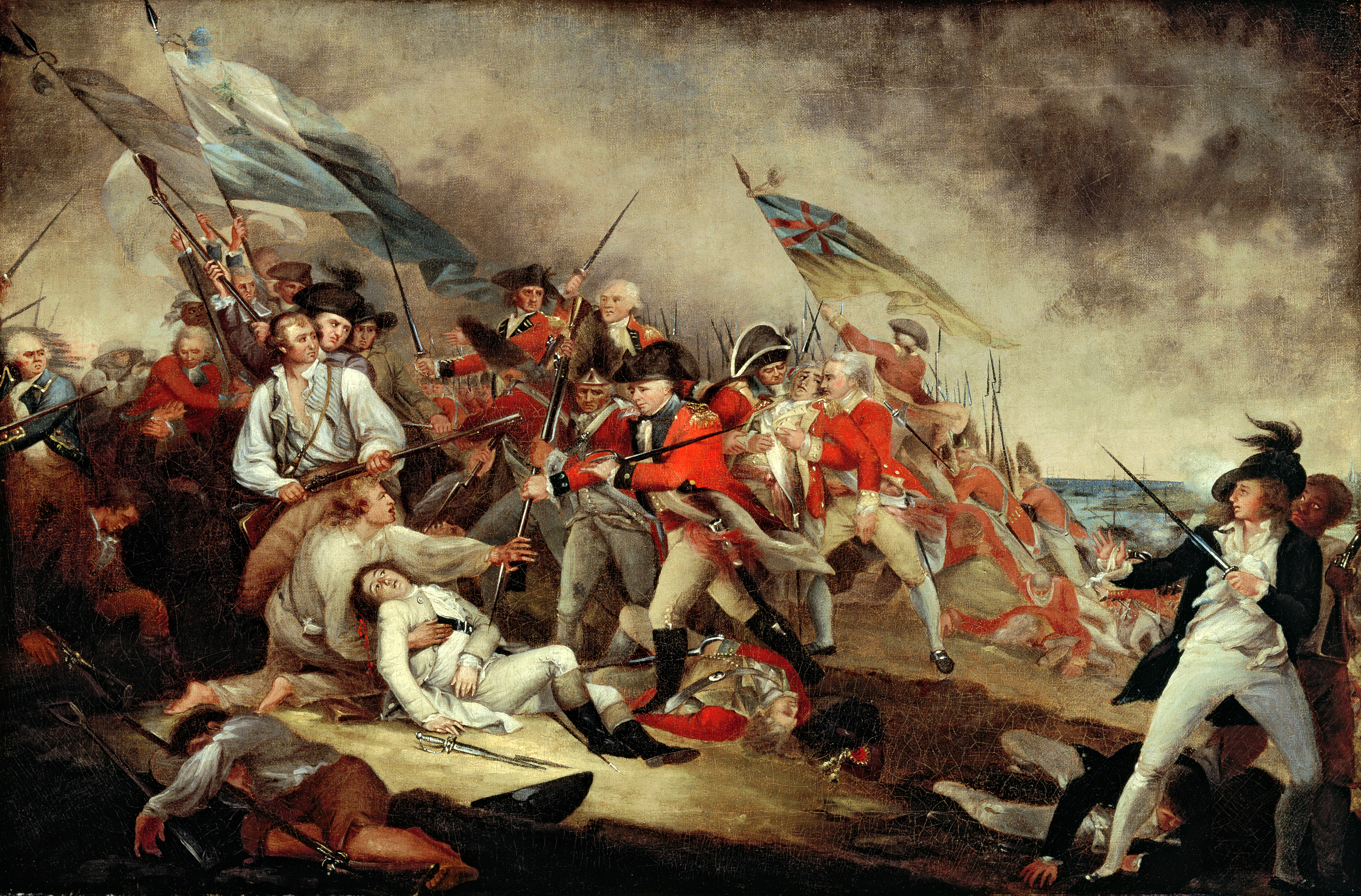
Abercrombie injured at Bunker Hill under the footsteps of Major John Small

There is much uncertainty about Abercrombie's family. He may have been related to the much better known General James Abercrombie, as described in Appletons' Cyclopedia of American Biography, but the Dictionary of Canadian Biography states that the common identification of him as the general's son or nephew is probably erroneous.

== Career ==
On 11 June 1744 Abercrombie was listed as a newly promoted Lieutenant of the 1st Foot. On 16 February 1756, he was promoted to the rank of Captain in the 42nd Foot. With this rank, he served in the French and Indian War, notably as one of General Abercrombie's aides in the Battle of Fort Carillon at Ticonderoga in 1758 before being made aide-de-camp to his successor Jeffrey Amherst in 1759. He was promoted to the rank of lieutenant colonel in 1770 and joined British forces assigned to the American colonies under the command of General Thomas Gage.

=== Death ===
On 17 June 1775, Abercrombie led his grenadier battalion in their charge of the redoubt on the Americans' left wing at the Battle of Bunker Hill. During the assault on Breed's Hill, he reportedly sustained a large gunshot wound on his right thigh from a black militiaman named Salem Poor, although there is a high probability that friendly fire caused the wound. Abercrombie was evacuated back to Boston and treated in the city's army hospital. He succumbed to his wound a week later while being cared for in the home of one of Gage's staff officers, military engineer John Montresor.

== Legacy ==
He is the namesake of Abercrombie, Nova Scotia.

== See also ==
- Richard Frothingham Jr.
