= Clare Nancy Russell =

Scottish noble

The Much Honoured Baroness of Ballindalloch CVO
- Born: Clare Macpherson-Grant Russell; 4 August 1944 (age 82); Scotland
- Occupation: Landowner
- Title: Lady Ballindalloch
- Spouse: Mr Oliver Henry Russell
- Children: 3

Clare Nancy Russell CVO (born 4 August 1944) is a Scottish noble landowner, the Lady Laird of Ballindalloch Castle on Speyside and was Lord Lieutenant of Banffshire from 2002 until 2019.

She is the only daughter of Major Sir Ewan George Macpherson-Grant, 6th and last Baronet of Ballindalloch (died 1983) and his wife Evelyn Nancy Stopford Dickin.

She married Oliver Henry Russell in 1967, the second son of Admiral Hon. Sir Guy Russell and his wife Hon. Helen Elizabeth Blades, daughter of Rowland Blades, 1st Baron Ebbisham. They have three children: Guy Ewan (born 1968) who assumed the surname of Macpherson Grant of Ballindalloch; Edward Oliver (born 1970); and Lucy Clare Nancy (born 1972).

Upon the death of her father in 1983, Russell inherited Ballindalloch Castle and its estate. She has been Chair of Queen Mary's Clothing Guild (Scotland) since 1986 and has served on the main board of the Children's Hospice Association Scotland (CHAS) for six years. She has also been involved with the Moray Health Council, the National Trust for Scotland, and the Scotland Garden Scheme.

In 1991, she was appointed Deputy Lieutenant for Banffshire, becoming Vice Lord Lieutenant in 1998. She succeeded J.A.S. McPherson as Lord Lieutenant in 2002, becoming Banffshire's first lady Lord Lieutenant. Since being appointed Russell has been a champion of the county (whose administrative area was abolished in 1975). She led a campaign to have road signs marking the historic county's boundaries reinstated in 2008.

As Clare Macpherson-Grant Russell, she has published two cookery books, "I Love Food" and "I Love Food 2".

Russell was appointed Commander of the Royal Victorian Order (CVO) in the 2017 Birthday Honours for her services as lord-lieutenant.

Honorary titles
Preceded by James Alexander Strachan McPherson	Lord Lieutenant of Banffshire; 2002–2019	Succeeded by Christopher Andrew Crawford Simpson
Baronage of Scotland
Preceded by Major Sir Ewan Macpherson-Grant, Bt (father)	Baroness of Ballindalloch; 1983–present	Succeeded by incumbent
