= Alexander Abercromby (Scottish politician, born 1678) =

Scottish Army officer and politician

Alexander Abercromby of Glassaugh, Fordyce, Banffshire (5 November 1678 – 23 December 1728) was a Scottish Army officer and politician who sat in the Parliament of Scotland from 1706 to 1707 and as a Whig in the British House of Commons from 1707 to 1727.

In 1699 he inherited Tullibody House east of Stirling from his cousin George Abercromby. He remodeled the house in 1710 and in 1719 additionally acquired the nearby Menstrie Castle. Abercromby was a book collector who had a significant private collection, and books bearing his bookplate can still be found in libraries today.

Abercromby was the third, but eldest surviving son of Alexander Abercromby and his wife Katherine Dunbar, daughter of Sir Robert Dunbar, of Grangehill, Elgin. By 1703, he married Helen Meldrum, daughter of George Meldrum of Crombie, Marnoch, Banff, minister of Glass, Banff. From 1706 he was an officer in the 21st Foot, the Royal Scots Fusiliers. He was ADC to the Duke of Marlborough in the Low Countries in 1711, and rose to the rank of lieutenant-colonel, retiring on half-pay in 1721.

Abercromby was Commissioner justiciary for the Highlands in 1701 and 1702. He was returned as Shire Commissioner for Banffshire in the Parliament of Scotland in 1706 and after the Act of Union was one of the Scottish representatives to the first Parliament of Great Britain in 1707. He was returned as Member of Parliament for Banffshire in the British general elections of 1708, 1710, 1713, 1715 and 1722. He did not stand in 1727. He was Lieutenant Governor of Fort William from 1726.

Abercrombie died on 23 December 1728. He and his wife, Helen Meldrum, had two sons and four daughters. His daughter Catherine was the great-grandmother of Lord Byron.

Parliament of Scotland
Preceded by Alexander Duff; James Ogilvie	Shire Commissioner for Banffshire; 1706–1707; With: James Ogilvie	Succeeded by Parliament of Great Britain
Parliament of Great Britain
New parliament	Member of Parliament for Scotland; 1707–1708	Constituency split
Preceded by John Murray	Member of Parliament for Banffshire; 1708–1727	Succeeded by William Duff, 1st Earl Fife
