= Baron of MacDuff =

Title of nobility in the Baronage of Scotland

Arms of Alexander Duff, 1st Duke of Fife and 7th Baron of MacDuff

Baron of Macduff is a title of nobility in the Baronage of Scotland.

The current baron is The Much Honoured Eric Cotton Dexter, 9th Baron of MacDuff.

The title originates in Macduf contained mostly within the boundaries of the Town of Macduff, in the Banff and Buchan area of Aberdeenshire, Scotland. Clan MacDuff traces origins to the historic, Lowland, Scottish Duff Clan. William Shakespeare's MacBeth has always played a role in the legend of Clan MacDuff, as few can determine the line between The Duff Family history and historical fiction. This ambiguity worked to the benefit of future MacDuff Barons, who were able to prove they were descended from the first Duff to receive a charter in Northeast Scotland. In 1404 David Duff received the charter, in Aberdeenshire, from Robert III of Scotland. In 1759, William Duff was granted the historic Celtic Title of “Fife”, further tying the Duffs of Northeast Scotland, with their ancient Lowland ancestors - the original Earls of Fife from the 11th century. William Duff had five sons - the eldest, James, would become the 2nd Earl Fife and the 1st Baron of MacDuff. James invested heavily in the village of Doune, or “Down”, across the River Deveron from Banff. He built a harbor there in 1760, which quickly became more successful than the harbor at neighboring Banff, which had been established much earlier. In 1783 a charter was granted by King George III, changing the name from Doune to Macduff in his favor and, although a lesser title than Earl, bestowing on him the dignity of the 1st Baron of Macduff.

== Barons of MacDuff ==
=== James Duff, 2nd Earl Fife, 1st Baron of MacDuff ===
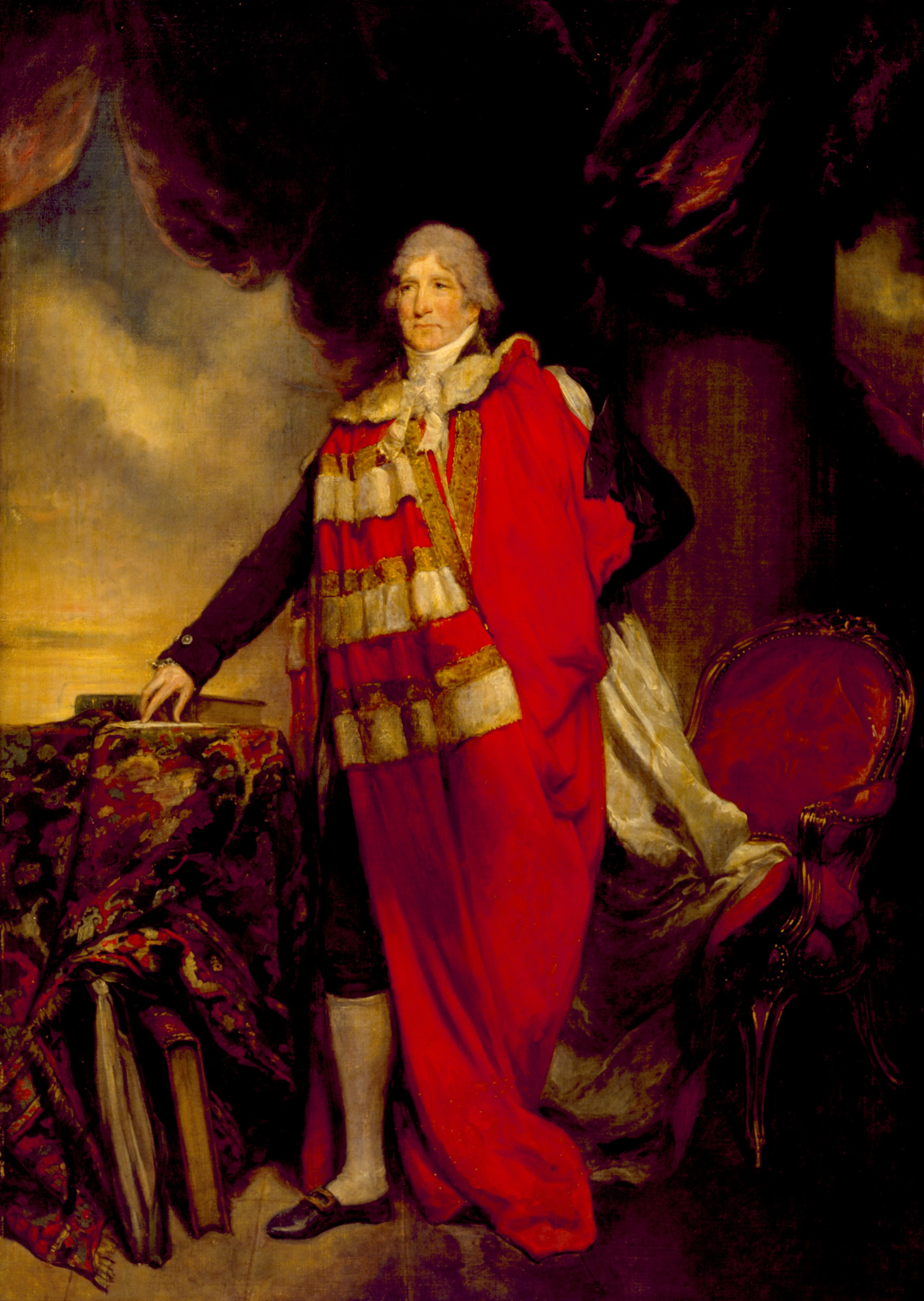
James Duff, 2nd Earl Fife, 1st Baron of MacDuff, 1729–1809

Born: 1729

Died: 1809

Preceded by: N/A

Succeeded by: Alexander Duff

Seat: Duff House

=== Alexander Duff, 3rd Earl Fife, 2nd Baron of MacDuff ===
Born: 1731

Died: 1811

Preceded by: James Duff

Succeeded by: James Duff

Seat: Duff House

=== James Duff, 4th Earl Fife, 3rd Baron of MacDuff ===
Born: 1776

Died: 1857

Preceded by: Alexander Duff

Succeeded by: James Duff

Seat: Duff House

=== James Duff, 5th Earl Fife, 4th Baron of MacDuff ===
Born: 1814

Died: 1857

Preceded by: James Duff

Succeeded by: Alexander Duff

Seat: Duff House

=== Alexander Duff, 1st Duke of Fife, 5th Baron of MacDuff ===
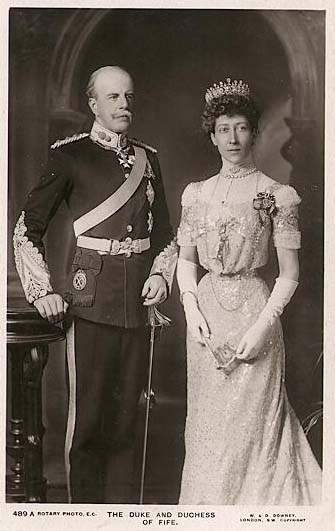
Alexander Duff, 1st Duke of Fife, 5th Baron of MacDuff with his wife, Louise, Princess Royal and Duchess of Fife, 1849–1912

Born: 1849

Died: 1912

Preceded by: James Duff

Succeeded by: Lady Alexandra Duff

Seat: Mar Lodge

=== Princess Alexandra, 2nd Duchess of Fife, 6th Baroness of MacDuff ===
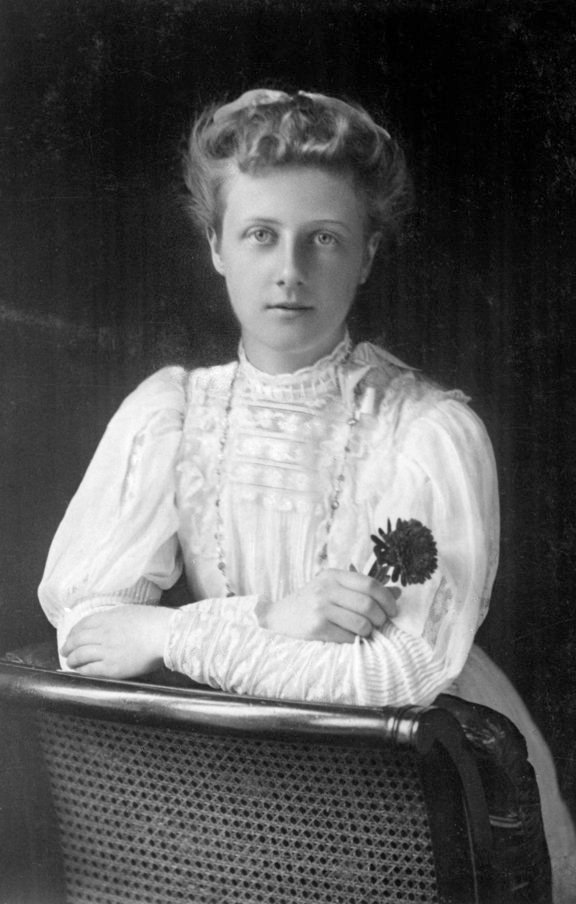
Princess Alexandra, 2nd Duchess of Fife, 6th Baroness of MacDuff, 1891–1959

Born: 1891

Died: 1959

Preceded by: Alexander Duff

Succeeded by: Alexander Ramsay of Mar

Seat: Mar Lodge

=== Alexander Ramsay of Mar, 7th Baron of MacDuff ===
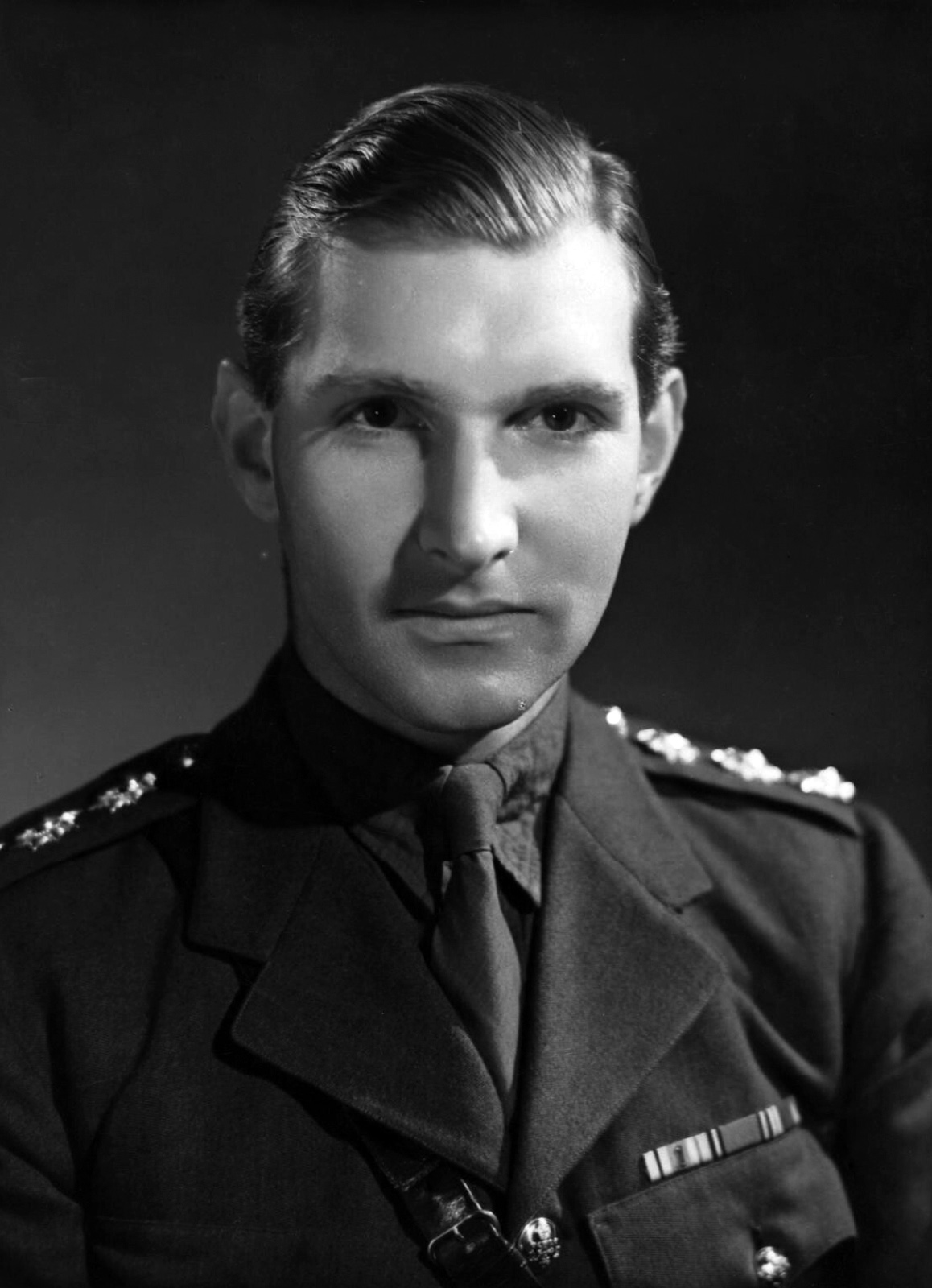
Alexander Ramsay of Mar, 7th Baron of MacDuff, 1919-2000

Born: 1919

Died: 2000

Preceded by: Lady Alexandra Duff

Succeeded by: James Mark Domesek

Seat: Mar Lodge

=== James Mark Domesek, 8th Baron of MacDuff ===
Born: unknown

Died: unknown

Preceded by: Alexander Ramsay of Mar

Succeeded by: Eric Cotton Dexter

=== Eric Cotton Dexter, 9th Baron of MacDuff ===
Born: 1971

Died: N/A

Preceded by: James Mark Domesek

Succeeded by: N/A

=== J.C. Dexter, Younger of MacDuff ===
Born: 2000

Died N/A

Heir Apparent to the Barony of MacDuff

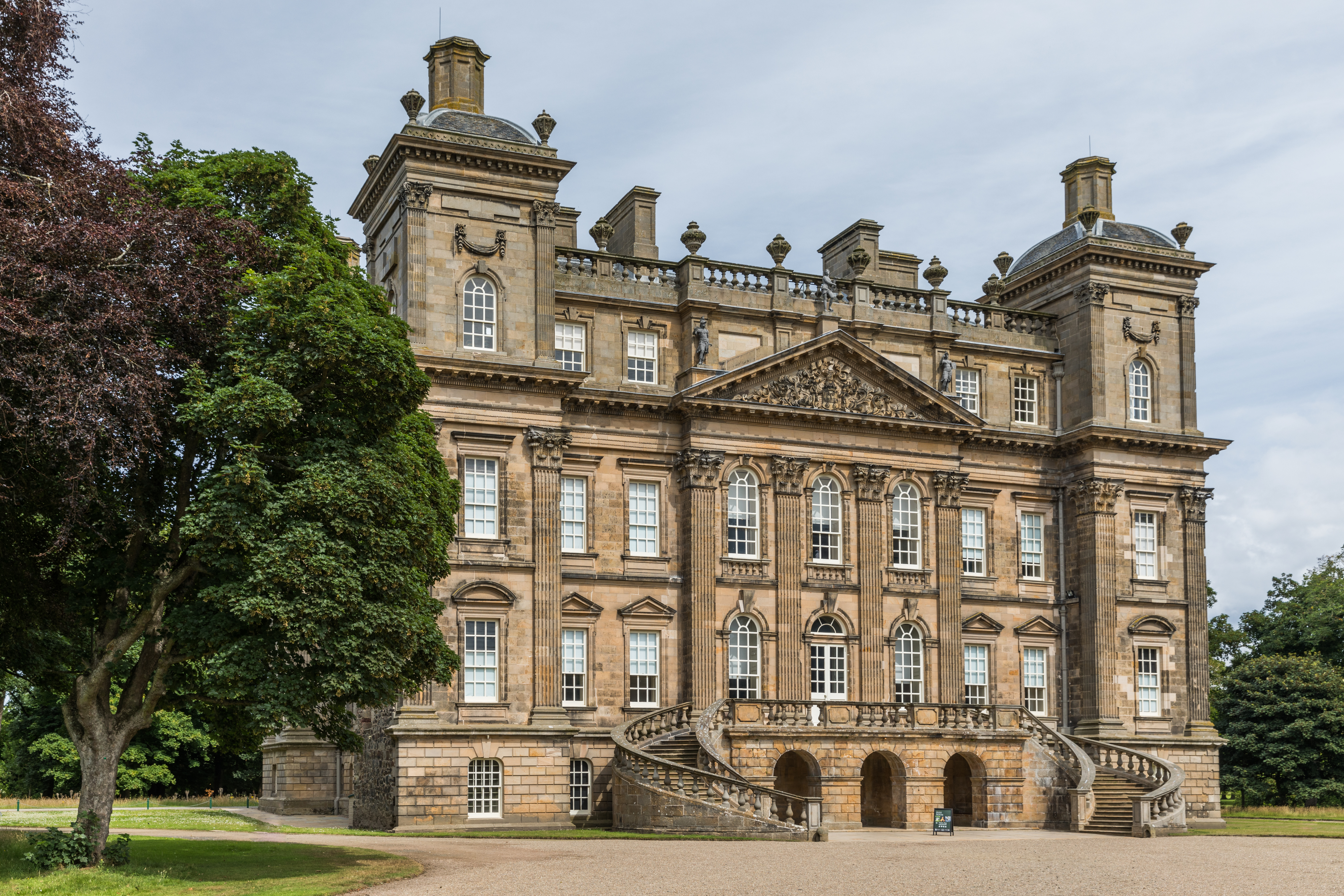
Duff House - Historic Seat of the 1st-4th Barons of MacDuff

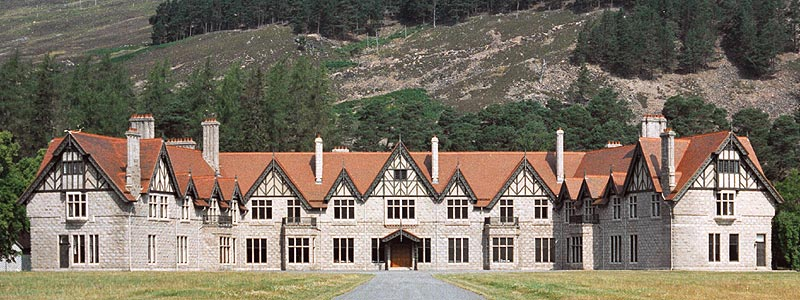
Mar Lodge - Historic Seat of the 5th-7th Barons of MacDuff

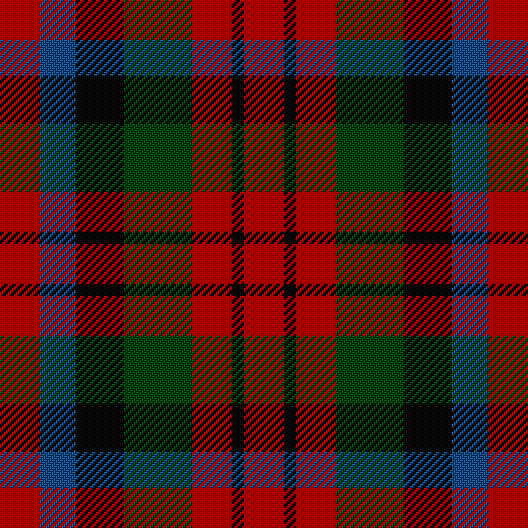
The main MacDuff tartan
