= Arthur Duff (MP) =

Scottish politician (1743–1805)

The Hon Arthur Duff (1743 – 2 June 1805) was a Scottish Member of Parliament who served during the latter part of the 1770s.

A younger son of William Duff, 1st Earl Fife, he was educated at St. Andrews University, Glasgow University and Leyden University.

He was member of Parliament for Elginshire from 1774 to 1779. He was appointed Steward of the Manor of East Hendred on 29 April 1779 to allow Lord William Gordon to be brought into Parliament. He was then appointed Comptroller of the Excise in Scotland.

He never married, and latterly lived at the estate at Orton, Moray he had inherited from his father.

== Legacy ==
The first Arthur's Bridge, opened in 1852, was named after Duff.

== Sources ==
- The History of Parliament: the House of Commons 1754–1790, ed. Lewis Bernstein Namier, John Brooke, 1964

Parliament of Great Britain
| Preceded by Francis Grant | Member of Parliament for Elginshire; 1774–1779 | Succeeded by Lord William Gordon |
