= Delgatie Castle =

Castle and museum in Aberdeenshire, Scotland

Coordinates: 57.5443°N 2.4120°W

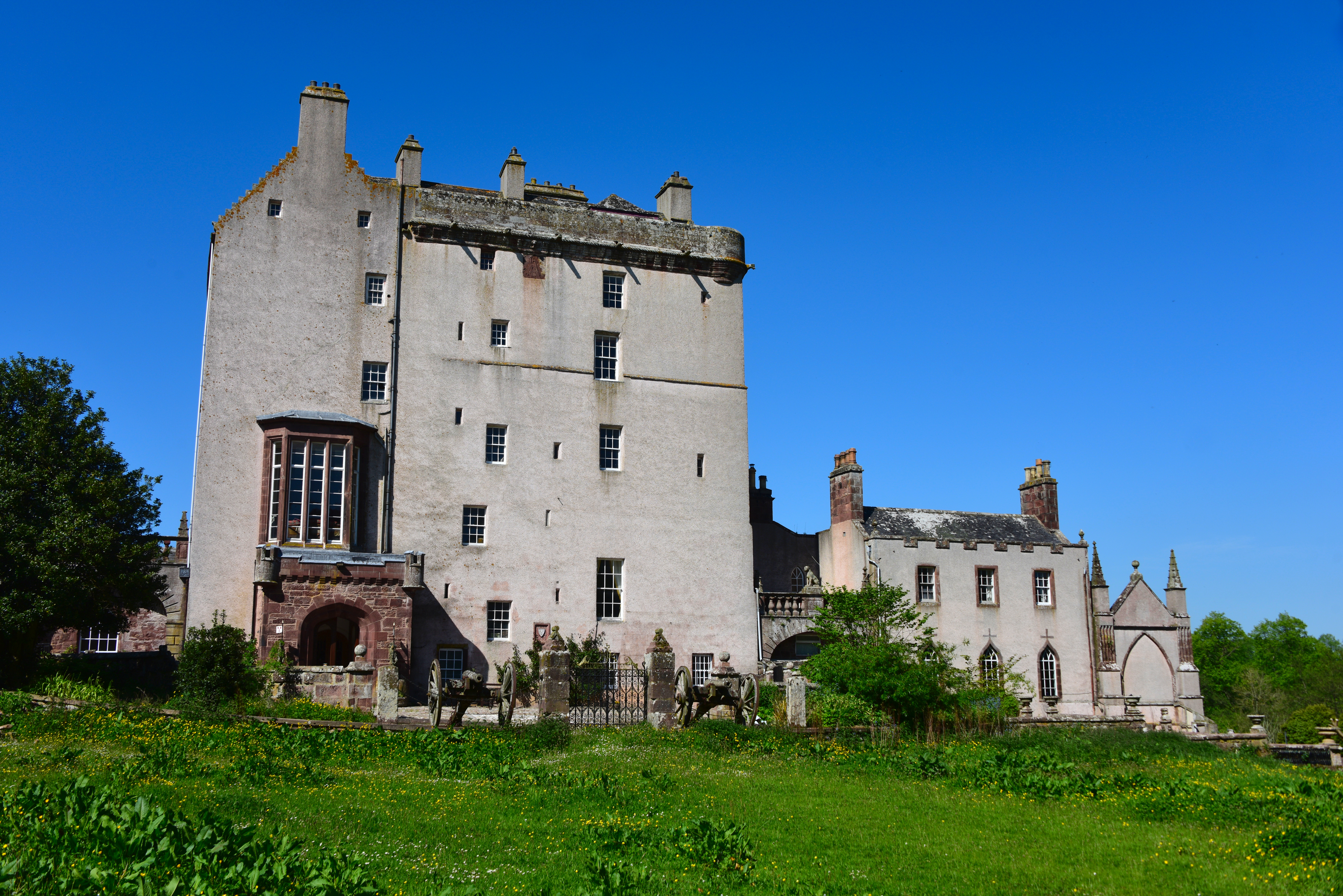
- The castle in 2017

Delgatie Castle is a castle near Turriff, in Aberdeenshire, Scotland. The castle consists of a white-harled, five-storey tower dating from the 16th century, with later extensions.

== History ==
A castle has stood on the site of Delgatie Castle since the year 1030 AD, although the earliest parts of the castle standing today were built between 1570 and 1579. Additional wings and a chapel were added in 1743.

The castle was stripped from Henry de Beaumont, Earl of Buchan, after the Battle of Bannockburn in 1314 and given to Clan Hay (later to become the Earls of Erroll). Mary, Queen of Scots, was a guest at the castle in 1562 after the Battle of Corrichie.

Architecturally, the castle consists of a keep, adjoining house and two later wings. Notable features include a very wide turnpike stair and painted ceilings dating from the 16th century in two of the rooms, one dating from 1592, and the other from 1597. The Hay family arms may be seen in many places, including the three cattle yokes which recall a farmer and his two sons who were instrumental in the defeat of a Danish raiding party at Cruden Bay.

In 1994, Captain Hay of Delgatie, the then owner of the castle, made the decision to open it as a visitor attraction. The opening took place on 9 July, when visitors were first welcomed and informed about the preservation and restoration works undertaken, which followed assessments in the early 1950s that had considered the building to be beyond repair.

Following the death of Captain Hay in 1997 Delgatie Castle has been managed by a private charitable trust, which continues to oversee public access, the tearoom and holiday accommodation. The interiors retain a domestic character, and the castle includes a room traditionally associated with a visit by Mary, Queen of Scots after the Battle of Corrichie.

The castle, its grounds and the café are open to the public. Suites within the castle and several cottages on the estate are available for rental. There is also a fishing area on the river that runs through the property.

In 2018, a memorial garden dedicated to animals that served and died in wartime was opened in front of Delgatie Castle.

The Delgatie Castle Tearoom near Turriff received two awards at the Scottish Café Awards in 2022, and in 2025 was recorded as the recipient of the Tearoom of the Year title at the Scottish Café and Bakery Awards.

== Gallery ==
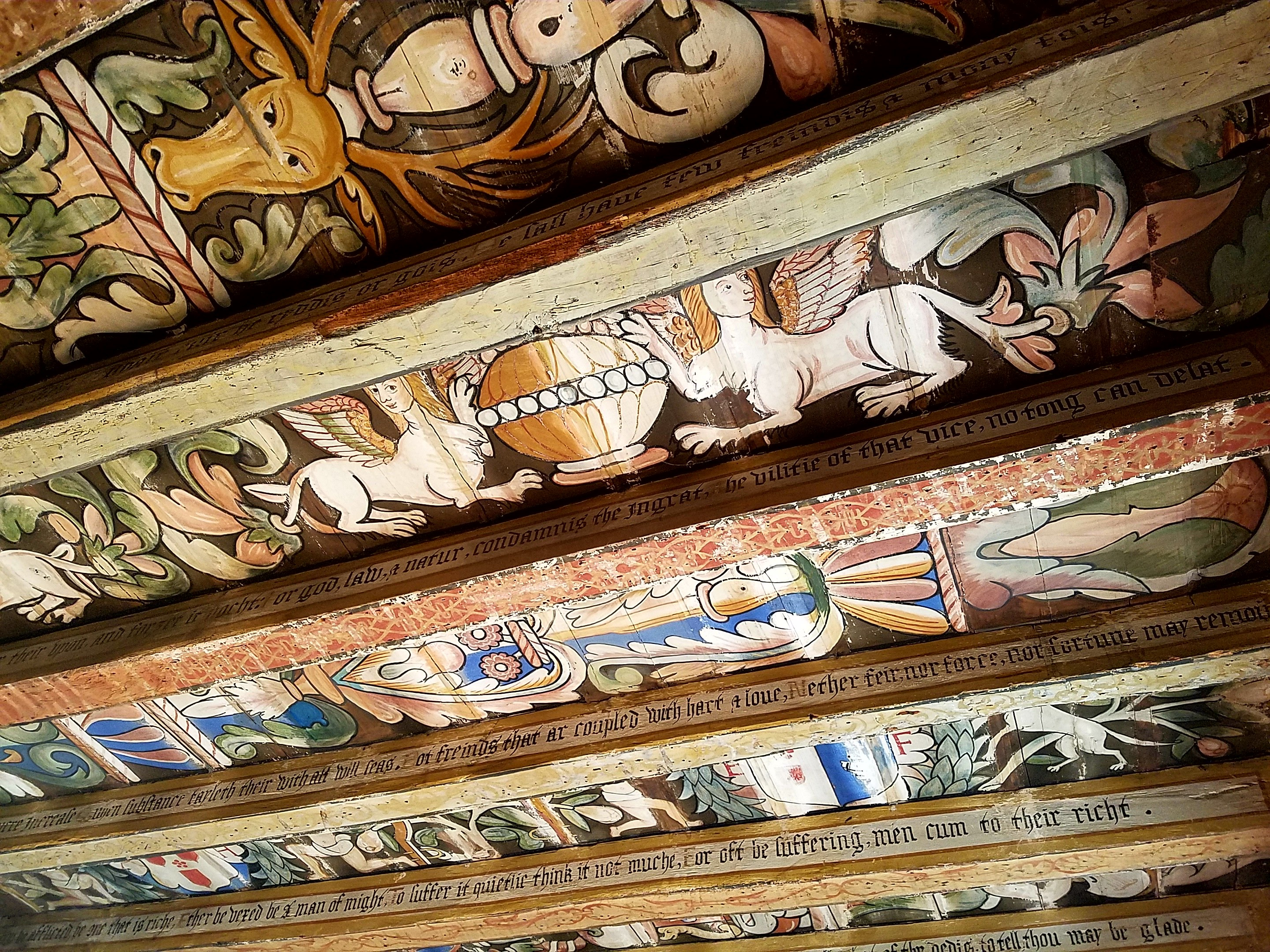
Painted ceiling in Delgatie Castle

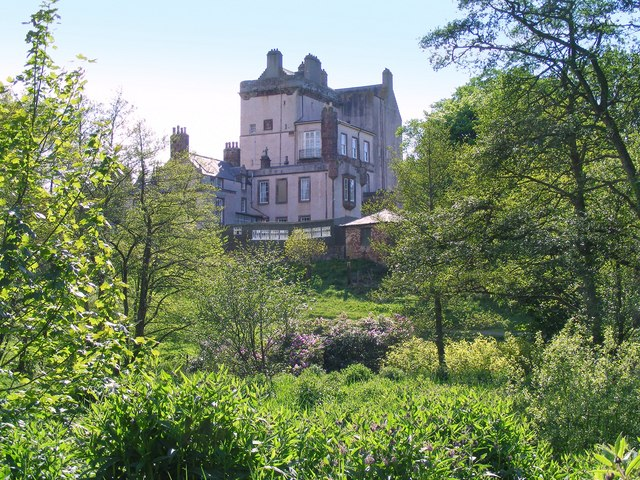
The castle seen from the gardens (2008)

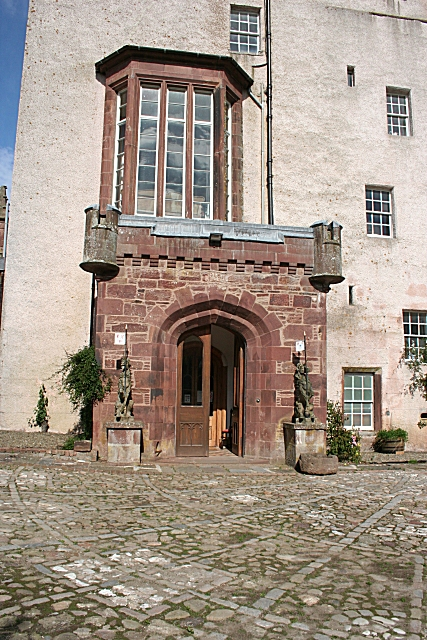
Entrance and ballroom window (2007)

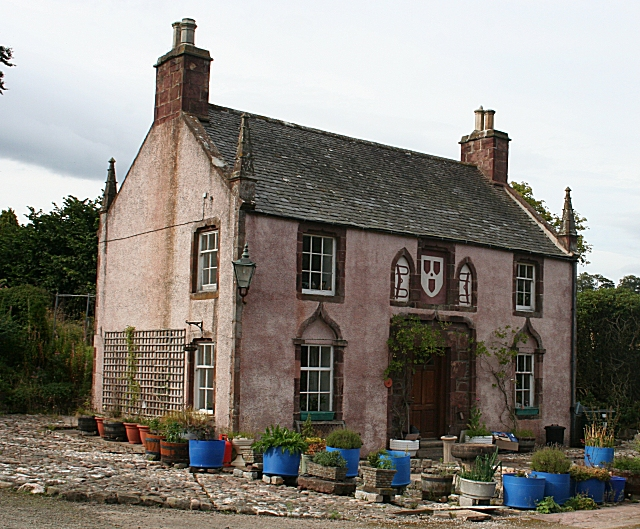
Cottage at the castle (2007)

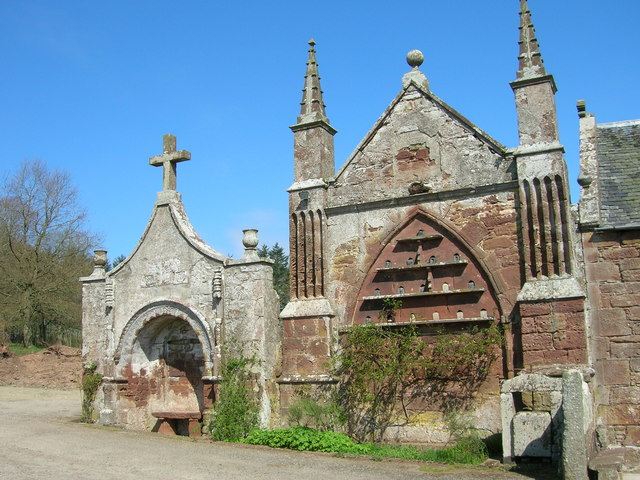
The castle's chapel (2006)
