= James Duff, 2nd Earl Fife =

Scottish aristocrat and Member of Parliament

The Right Honourable The Earl Fife
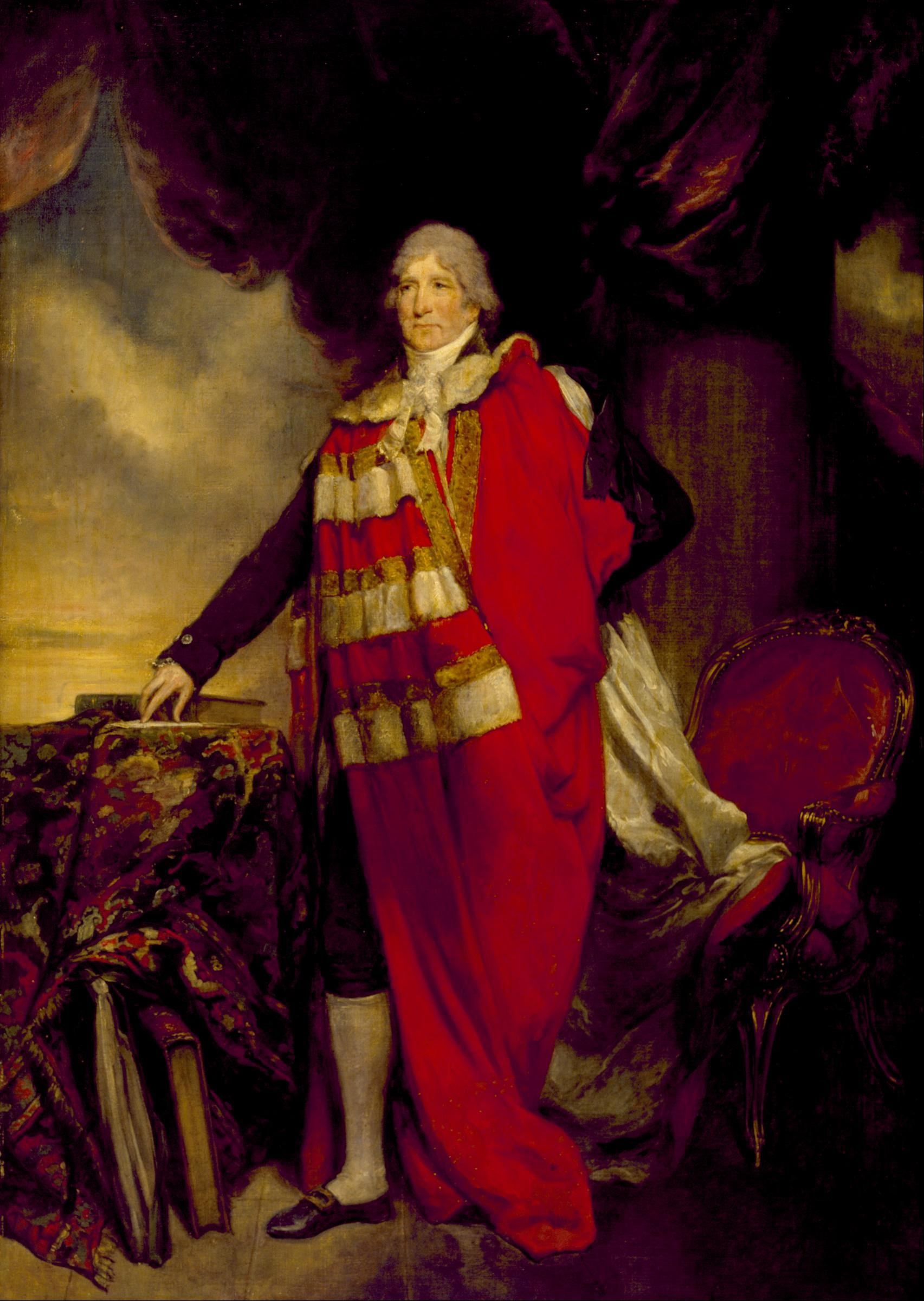
- The Earl Fife by Arthur William Devis

Member of Parliament for Elginshire
- In office 1784–1790
- Preceded by: Lord William Gordon
- Succeeded by: Ludovick Alexander Grant

Member of Parliament for Banffshire
- In office 1754–1784
- Preceded by: James Abercrombie
- Succeeded by: Sir James Duff

Personal details
- Born: 29 September 1729
- Died: 1809 (aged 79–80)

James Duff, 2nd Earl Fife (29 September 1729 – 1809) was a Scottish aristocrat and Member of Parliament.

== Heritage ==
James Duff was second son of William Duff, 1st Earl Fife, and Jean Grant (daughter of Sir James Grant of Pluscardine, Baron of Luss and Grant), his father's second wife. His father, son of William Duff of Dipple, co. Banff, was M.P. for Banffshire 1727–34, was created Lord Braco in the peerage of Ireland 28 July 1735, and was advanced to the dignity of Earl of Fife and Viscount Macduff, also in the peerage of Ireland, by patent dated 26 April 1759, on proving his descent from Macduff, Earl of Fife.

== Politics ==
In 1754, he became Member of Parliament for Banffshire, was re-elected in 1761, 1768, 1774, and 1780, and in 1784 elected to represent Elginshire until 1790. He gave the Banff town of Macduff its name, having changed it by Crown Charter from Doune in 1783. He extended the town and built a harbour at a cost of £5,000 ensuring economic prosperity.

Duff was one of the most powerful and influential men in Aberdeenshire, Banffshire and Morayshire due to his massive estate. Due to his political commitments in Westminster, the running of the Estate was largely left to his factors - in particular William Rose of Ballivant. For his service to Duff, Rose was awarded many political favours. First, Duff gave Rose a vote in three different constituencies (Aberdeenshire, Banffshire, Morayshire), he appointed him the first Provost of Macduff, and latterly the Sheriff Clerk of Banffshire.

He was created a British peer by the title of Baron Fife, 19 February 1790. He held the appointment of lord-lieutenant of county Banff.

== Estates ==
He succeeded his father in the title and estates in September 1763, and devoted himself to the improvement of the property, which he largely increased by the purchase of land in the north of Scotland. He was twice awarded the gold medal of the Society for the Encouragement of Arts, Manufactures, and Commerce, for his plantations, with which he covered fourteen thousand acres. He offered the farmers on his estate every inducement to cultivate their land on the most approved principles, and himself set the example by instituting near each of his seats a model farm, where agriculture and cattle-breeding were carried on under his personal supervision. In 1782 and 1783, when all crops failed, he allowed his highland tenants a reduction of twenty per cent. on their rents, and disposed of grain to the poor considerably below the market price, importing several cargoes from England, which he sold at a loss of £3,000.

In 1787 he was elected a Fellow of the Royal Society.

== Family ==
James Duff married on 5 June 1759, Lady Dorothea Sinclair, only child of Alexander Sinclair, 9th Earl of Caithness, but he had no issue, and his British peerage became extinct on his death. He was succeeded in his Irish earldom by his next brother, Alexander. However he had three children by his mother's personal maid, Margaret Adam, of Keith, all of whom were born before his marriage to Sinclair. The eldest, James, became a general and a Member of Parliament.

He was a lover of the famous courtesan Kitty Kennedy.

== Death ==
He died at his home, Fife House, Whitehall, London, on 24 January 1809, and was buried in the mausoleum at Duff House, Banffshire.

== Notes ==
Parliament of Great Britain
Preceded by James Abercromby	Member of Parliament for Banffshire; 1754–1784	Succeeded by Sir James Duff
Preceded by Lord William Gordon	Member of Parliament for Elginshire; 1784–1790	Succeeded by Ludovick Alexander Grant
Honorary titles
New office	Lord Lieutenant of Banffshire; 1794–1809	Succeeded by In Commission
Peerage of Ireland
Preceded by William Duff	Earl Fife; 1763–1809	Succeeded by Alexander Duff
Peerage of Great Britain
New creation	Baron Fife; 1st creation 1790–1809	Extinct
