= William Duff, 1st Earl Fife =

Scottish nobleman

The Right Honourable The Earl Fife

Member of Parliament for Banffshire
- In office 1727–1734
- Preceded by: Alexander Abercromby
- Succeeded by: James Abercromby

Personal details
- Born: William Duff; 1697
- Died: 30 September 1763 (aged 65–66)
- Spouse(s): Lady Janet Forbes (m. 1719; died 1720) Jean Grant (m. 1723; died 1763)
- Children: 11, including James, Alexander, Arthur
- Parent(s): William Duff; Jean Gordon

William Duff, 1st Earl Fife (1697 – 30 September 1763), of Braco was a Scottish landowner and politician who sat in the House of Commons from 1727 to 1734.

== Early life ==
Duff was the eldest surviving son of William Duff, merchant, of Dipple and Braco, and his wife Jean Gordon, daughter of Sir George Gordon, Shire Commissioner in the Parliament of Scotland, of Edinglassie, Aberdeen.

== Career ==
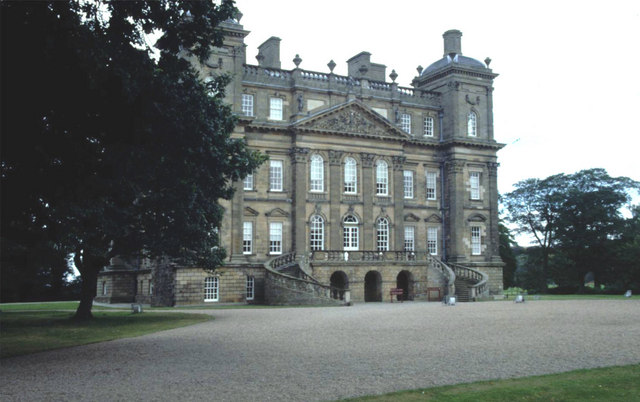
Duff House, Banff

Duff was returned unopposed as Member of Parliament for Banffshire at the 1727 British general election. He spoke and voted against the Government on the Hessians in 1730 and also voted against the Administration on the repeal of the Septennial Act in 1734. At the 1734 British general election, he stood down in favour of his brother-in-law James Abercromby. Abercrombie was a government supporter, and as a reward, Duff was created Lord Braco of Kilbryde in the Peerage of Ireland on 28 July 1735. He continued to dominate the political scene at Banffshire.

In 1740, he commissioned the construction of Duff House in Banff. He was later created Earl Fife and Viscount Macduff, also in the peerage of Ireland, by letters patent dated 26 April 1759, after proving his descent from the MacDuffs, Earls of Fife.

== Personal life ==
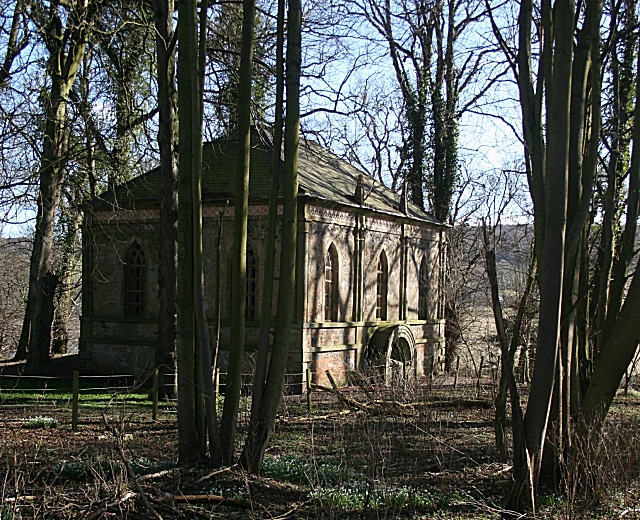
Duff House mausoleum

In 1719 he married Lady Janet Forbes (c. 1695–1720), widow of Hugh Forbes, Younger of Craigievar, and second daughter of James Ogilvy, 4th Earl of Findlater and the former Anne Dunbar (a daughter of Sir William Dunbar, 1st Baronet).

After her death in 1720, he married Jean Grant (1705–1788), second daughter of Sir James Grant, 6th Baronet, of Pluscardine. in 1723. He inherited substantial estates from his father on his death in 1722. By his second wife Jean he had seven sons and seven daughters, including:

- Hon. William Duff (1724–1753), who died unmarried.
- Lady Anne Duff (1725–1805), who married Alexander Duff, 2nd of Hatton, son of Alexander Duff, 1st of Hatton, in 1745.
- Lady Janet Duff (1727–1758), who married Sir William Gordon of Park, 3rd Baronet, son of Sir James Gordon of Park, 2nd Baronet and Hon. Helen Fraser (a daughter of William Fraser, 12th Lord Saltoun), in 1745. After his death, she married George Hay of Mountblary, son of Andrew Hay.
- James Duff, 2nd Earl Fife (1729–1809), MP for Elginshire and Banffshire; he married Lady Dorothea Sinclair, only child of Alexander Sinclair, 9th Earl of Caithness, in 1759.
- Alexander Duff, 3rd Earl Fife (1731–1811), who married Mary Skene, daughter of George Skene, 18th of Skene, in 1775.
- Lady Jane Duff (1732–1776), who married Keith Urquhart of Meldrum, son of William Urquhart, in 1753.
- Hon. George Duff (1736–1828), who married Frances Dalzell, daughter of Gibson Dalzell, in 1757.
- Hon. Ludovic Duff (1737–1811), who married Deborah Davis, daughter of Griffith Davis, in 1767.
- Patrick Duff (1738–1738), who died young.
- Lady Helen Duff (1739–1778), who married Vice-Admiral Robert Duff of Logie and Fetteresso, son of Patrick Duff, in 1764.
- Lady Sophia Henrietta Duff (1740–1826), who married Thomas Wharton-Duff in 1774.
- Lady Catherine Duff (1741–1765), who died unmarried.
- Hon. Arthur Duff (1743–1805), MP for Elginshire who died unmarried.
- Lady Margaret Duff (1745–1786), who married James Brodie, 21st Thane and Chief of Clan Brodie, son of James Brodie, in 1768.

Lord Fife died on 30 September 1763, and was buried in the parish church of Grange, before being moved to the mausoleum at Duff House. He was succeeded by his eldest surviving son James. On his death without issue in 1809, he was succeeded by his younger brother Alexander.

Parliament of Great Britain
Preceded by Alexander Abercromby	Member of Parliament for Banffshire; 1727–1734	Succeeded by James Abercromby
Peerage of Ireland
New creation	Earl Fife; 1759–1763	Succeeded by James Duff
New creation	Baron Braco; 1735–1763	Succeeded by James Duff
