= Duff House =

Estate house in Banff, Aberdeenshire, Scotland

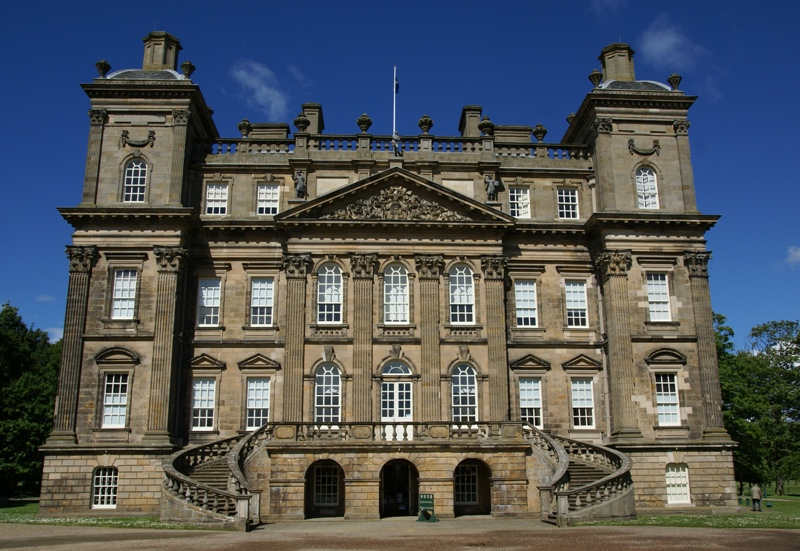
- Location: Banff, Aberdeenshire, Scotland
- Coordinates: 57.658679°N 2.5201128°W
- Website: National Galleries

Listed Building – Category A
- Official name: Duff House
- Designated: 22 February 1972
- Reference no.: LB21985

Listed Building – Category A
- Official name: Duff House, Mausoleum
- Designated: 22 February 1972
- Reference no.: LB21988

Listed Building – Category A
- Official name: Duff House, Fishing Temple
- Designated: 04 March 1994
- Reference no.: LB2885

Listed Building – Category B
- Official name: Duff House, Walled Garden
- Designated: 15 March 1995
- Reference no.: LB21989

Listed Building – Category B
- Official name: Duff House, Fife Gates
- Designated: 15 March 1995
- Reference no.: LB21986

Listed Building – Category C(S)
- Official name: Duff House Icehouse
- Designated: 15 March 1995
- Reference no.: LB21987

Designations

Inventory of Gardens and Designed Landscapes in Scotland
- Official name: Duff House
- Designated: 1 July 1987
- Reference no.: GDL00148

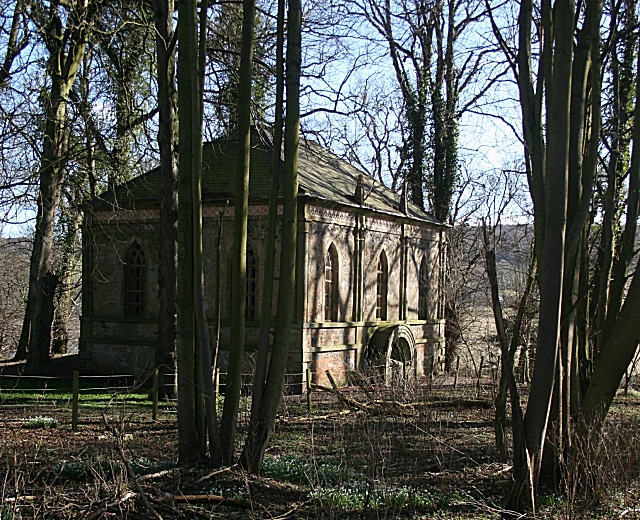
Duff House mausoleum

Duff House is a Georgian estate house in Banff, Aberdeenshire, Scotland. Now in the care of Historic Environment Scotland, it is part of the National Galleries Scotland and is a Category A listed building.

The house is built of ashlar in three storeys to a square plan (9-bay x 8-bay) on a raised basement with advanced corner towers.

The house and the associated Fife gates, walled garden, Collie lodge, mausoleum, ice house, Bridge Gates House and the Eagles Gate lodge are designated as Category A listed group of buildings.

== History ==
Duff House was designed by William Adam and built between 1735 and 1740 for William Duff, Lord Braco, later 1st Earl Fife (heir of the ancient Earls of Fife). The design and construction resulted in a legal dispute between the architect and owner which culminated in a legal case in 1743. Construction began on 11 June 1735. The design of the house originally intended to have flanking pavilions linked by colonnaded quadrants but these were never completed as the Earl thought the house would be too large. This, along with further disagreements on the issue of mason work resulted in the legal case between the architect and Earl.

David Bryce Jr was later commissioned to provide a three-storey pavilion and corridor block, but this was damaged by a bomb in 1940 and subsequently demolished. The Dukes of Fife moved out of Duff House in 1903, gifting the property to Banff Burgh in 1906. Between 1911 and 1913, the House functioned as a hotel and then became a sanatorium until 1923 when it became a hotel again. The hotel closed in 1928 and Duff House entered a period of limited use. However, during the Second World War the House became an internment camp and later a prisoner of war camp. In 1940, the House was damaged during a bombing raid resulting in eight dead and serious damage to parts of the building. By 1942, the House was used by the Free Norwegian forces as their Headquarters, along with use by Polish exile forces.

In 1956 it passed into care by the State and a period of refurbishment began across the property. In 1995, the house became part of the National Galleries of Scotland. The house still sits in much of its original designed landscape, albeit with the addition of a golf course.

== Art collection ==
National Galleries Scotland has numerous works of fine art on display at Duff House, including works by El Greco, Thomas Gainsborough and Henry Raeburn. Duff House is also home to the Dunimarle Library, a collection of rare books, which can be viewed by appointment.
