= Local Hero =

Local Hero or Local Heroes may refer to:

- Local Hero (film), a 1983 Scottish comedy-drama by Bill Forsyth
  - Local Hero (soundtrack), a music album by Mark Knopfler from the film
  - Local Hero (musical), a 2019 musical based on the film
- Local hero (Japan), a Japanese superhero
- Local Hero (TV series), a 2016 South Korean television drama
- "Local Hero" (Ever Decreasing Circles), a 1986 television episode
- Local Hero Award, a part of the Australian of the Year awards
- Local Heroes (company), a British online business
- Local Heroes (British TV series), a 1991 science and history television series
- Local Heroes (American TV series), a 1996 comedy series
