= What the Ancients Did for Us =

British historical documentary television series

- Genre: Documentary
- Directed by: Kate Murray; Monika Kupper; Kate Rea; Naomi Granger
- Presented by: Adam Hart-Davis; Hermione Cockburn; Jamie Darling; Amani Zain; Marty Jopson
- Country of origin: United Kingdom
- Original language: English
- No. of episodes: 9

Production
- Producers: Martin Kemp; Liz Tucker; Ian Potts
- Editor: Roger Dacier
- Running time: 60 minutes

Original release
- Network: BBC Two
- Release: February 2005

What the Ancients Did for Us is a 2005 BBC documentary series presented by Adam Hart-Davis that examines the impact of ancient civilizations on modern society.

== Production ==
The series was produced in conjunction with the Open University and is a departure from the previous series not only in that each episode is an hour long rather than half an hour (though heavily edited half-hour versions have also been shown), but also in that it does not concentrate on a single period of history but rather one ancient civilization per episode including the Chinese, the Indians and the Greeks.

== Episodes ==
=== Episode one: The Islamic World ===
The Arab and Muslim world has had a profound and lasting influence on our life today, the list is long and full of surprises, but perhaps the most important thing that the Islamic Empire did for us is preserve, refine and improve all the knowledge left by the scholars of the ancients, and without that work by the Muslim scholars all of that knowledge might have been lost and our lives much the poorer.

— Adam Hart-Davis

This episode features reports from Zain in Egypt, Spain and France elaborated by demonstrations from Adam Hart-Davis, Marty Jopson and expert guests that examine the ideas and inventions that emerged from the Islamic Golden Age.

- The Astrolabe, demonstrated to Hart-Davis, was used by Abd al-Rahman al-Sufi and Abu-Mahmud al-Khujandi to develop Islamic astronomy and Islamic geography.
- Optical science was developed using a camera obscura, demonstrated by Hart-Davis, created by Ibn al-Haytham, an Iraqi physicist, while under house arrest.
- The windmill, demonstrated by Jopsom, originated in Afghanistan and was brought back to the West by the Crusaders.
- The House of Wisdom founded by al-Ma'mun translated and preserved the science and philosophy of the ancient Greeks.
- The grab, demonstrated by Jopsom, was designed by the Banū Mūsā brothers to pick things up from the seabed.
- The Elephant clock and Multiculturalism by the Kurdish engineer al-Jazari.
- The Alhambra, visited by Zain, features magnificent gravity-driven fountains in the finest example of early Islamic architecture.
- Etiquette, fashion and fine-dining were introduced in Andalusia, visited by Zain, by a freed slave Ziryab.
- Lusterware, demonstrated to Hart-Davis, was developed by early Muslim alchemists to create beautiful porcelain.
- Distillation, demonstrated by Jopsom, was developed by ibn Hayyan using the alembic to make perfume, petrol and alcohol.
- Soap making, demonstrated by Hart-Davis, introduced hard soap to the bathhouses of the Islamic World.
- The reciprocating piston suction pump, incorporating a crankshaft-connecting rod mechanism, invented by Al-Jazari, is demonstrated.
- The torpedo by the Syrian inventor Hasan al-Rammah is demonstrated.

=== Episode two: The Chinese ===
Cut off from the rest of the world for centuries, the Chinese developed a unique culture and made many technological, scientific and artistic advances long before the West. Now the creative forces that shaped this huge country have exploded into the full glare of the 21st century.

— Adam Hart-Davis

This episode features reports from Darling in China and demonstrations from Hart-Davis and Jopsom that examine the ideas and inventions that emerged from Ancient China.

- Canals linked the Yellow River and the Yangzi River in the 3rd century BC for transport and communication across the vast empire.
- The segmented arch bridge demonstrated by Hart-Davis in a potted history of bridge design was developed in the 7th century AD.
- Silk developed in China from the cocoons of silkworms is demonstrated to be weight-for-weight stronger than steel in a tug-of-war.
- The seismograph recreated by Jopsom based on the pendulum principal of its modern equivalent was developed in the 2nd century AD.
- Noodles developed as early as 5000 BC were taken back to Italy by Marco Polo in the 13th century.
- Tuned bells developed around 600 AD and are demonstrated by Hart-Davis to be the basis of a standardised system of measurement.
- The double acting piston bellows used in the early iron industry and in the development of the first flamethrower is recreated by Jopsom.
- Kite making goes back a thousand years and demonstrates a basic understanding of aerodynamics.
- Paper first made around 100 AD was used in the art of calligraphy demonstrated to Darling and as toilet paper demonstrated by Hart-Davis.
- Block printing was used by Monks for the distribution of the Buddhist sutras with the earliest known printed book dated to 868 AD.
- Paper money originally developed by private businessmen to confound highwaymen was taken up by the state in the 11th century.
- Gunpowder accidentally discovered by alchemists over 1,000 years ago was used in fireworks and bombs as demonstrated by Davis.

=== Episode three: The Aztecs, Maya and Incas ===
This episode examines the ideas and inventions that emerged from the Aztec, Mayan and Incan peoples of Pre-columbian America.

=== Episode four: The Romans ===
This episode examines the ideas and inventions that emerged from Ancient Rome.

=== Episode five: The Indians ===
The culture of India has always been closely linked to religion, several world faiths began here, such as Hinduism, Sikhism and Buddhism, and over the millennia they have all left their imprint on Indian thought.

— Adam Hart-Davis

This episode features reports from Darling in India and demonstrations from Hart-Davis, Jopson and other experts that examine the ideas and inventions that emerged from Ancient India.

- Water clocks to regulate Buddhist meditations are discovered by Darling and recreated by Jopson for demonstration.
- Observatories, like the 18th century Jantar Mantar visited by Darling, precisely monitored the sun for more accurate measurements of time.
- Harappan cities, like the 4,000-year-old Dholavira visited by Darling, were built to a grid-plan and boasted the world's first sewage system.
- Indian numerals, including the number zero discovered by Darling in a 9th-century temple, revolutionised modern mathematics.
- Cotton cultivated, woven and coloured with traditional techniques taught to Darling by local workers for export all over the world.
- Metalworking resulted in wonders like the iron pillar visited by Darling and Wootz steel.
- Yoga as demonstrated by Darling developed 4,000 years ago to unite the spiritual and the physical.
- Herbal remedies, using ingredients such as cocoa butter, ginseng and ginger, have been adopted into Western medicine.
- Surgery, including early plastic surgery, developed some 2,500 years ago.
- Inoculation against smallpox, as demonstrated by Davis on Jompson, emerged centuries before Edward Jenner.
- Chess is a simplified version of the ancient Indian game of military strategy chaturanga.
- Rockets demonstrated at the Royal Artillery Museum were first deployed against the British Army by the Tipu Sultan in 1780.

=== Episode six: The Mesopotamians ===
Mesopotamia means the land between the rivers, the Tigris and the Euphrates that flow through modern day Syria and Iraq; in this narrow strip of land human history began. The Mesopotamians weren't just a single people, but a whole series of overlapping civilisations, the Sumerians, the Akkadians, the Babylonians and the Assyrians, each one building on the achievements of the one before, and between them they laid the foundations of our civilisation.

— Adam Hart-Davis

This episode features reports from Cockburn in Syria and Bahrain elaborated by demonstrations from Hart-Davis, Jopson and a variety of experts that examine ideas and inventions of the Mesopotamians.

- Wooden frames demonstrated by Cockburn for the mass production of mud bricks used in building the first cities.
- Irrigation devices, including the Archimedes' screw demonstrated by Jopson, improved agricultural yield and protected against flooding.
- Liver omens demonstrated to Davies used systemically recorded observations to understand the world in a primitive science.
- The Zodiac and horoscopes gave priests the astronomical know-how to accurately predict the coming of the seasons.
- Farming developed around 10,000 years ago with inventions such as the plough, the sickle, demonstrated by Cockburn.
- Yeast used in recipes for bread and beer, demonstrated by Cockburn and Davies, first recorded around 4,000 years ago.
- Cuneiform characters impressed into soft clay tablets with a stylus as demonstrated by Cockburn was the first writing system.
- Literature such as the Epic of Gilgamesh related by Davies was first written down some 4,000 years ago.
- Diving and Sailing, demonstrated by Cockburn and Davies, are first recorded in the Epic.
- Organised warfare with uniformed soldiers carrying standardised weapons is first recorded 4,500 years ago on the Standard of Ur.
- Buoyancy aids made from inflatable goatskins, demonstrated by Cockburn, allowed armies to cross rivers.
- The wheel used on war chariots and siege engines recreated by Cockburn and Jopsom was developed over 4,000 years ago.

=== Episode seven: The Egyptians ===
It's impossible to think of Egypt without thinking of the Nile, the longest river in the world. In a country mostly covered by desert the river has always been its lifeblood, without it there would have been no pharaohs, no pyramids and no ancient civilisation. There understanding of the river and its seasonal changes would be the key to Egypt's prosperity.

— Adam Hart-Davis

This episode features reports from Zain in Egypt elaborated by demonstrations from Adam Hart-Davis, Marty Jopson and expert guests that examine developments of the Ancient Egyptians.

- Boat building, like the sewn-plank vessel reconstructed by Jopsom, allowed trade along the Nile and beyond.
- Mass-production, using the foot-bellows reconstructed by Jopsom, supplied the tools used to construct the great monuments.
- Early dam building, like the Dam of the Pagans reconstructed by Jopsom, failed to control flooding and was abandoned.
- Mummification techniques, demonstrated by Hart-Davis, indicate an advanced understanding of human anatomy.
- Propaganda, like that visited by Zain at Luxor Temple, was carved to demonstrate the power of the Pharaohs.
- Hieroglyphs, decoded from the Rosetta Stone explained to Hart-Davis, were used to record the civilisation.
- Glass making, using core-forming demonstrated to Hart-Davis, provided a material now taken for granted.
- Craftsmanship, demonstrated by the treasures of Tutankhamun visited, is still greatly admired.
- Furniture making, using techniques and tools demonstrated by Jopsom, are little changed today.
- Recreational fishing, demonstrated by Hart-Davis, originated with the Ancient Egyptian nobility.
- Astronomical observations, demonstrated by Hart-Davis, allowed for the perfect alignment of the pyramids.
- Wooden sledges, reconstructed by Jopsom, transported the blocks used to construct the Pyramids.

=== Episode eight: The Greeks ===
On the shores of the Aegean Sea three-and-a-half-thousand years ago a new civilisation emerged, one that more than any other laid the foundations of our own society. When you think of the ancient Greeks you think of democracy, theatre, music, mathematics, but what appeals to me is their sheer ingenuity.

— Adam Hart-Davis

This episode features reports from Cockburn in Greece and Italy elaborated by demonstrations from Hart-Davis, Jopson and expert guests that examine the ideas and inventions that emerged from Ancient Greece.

- Geometry allowed for advances in engineering such as the Tunnel of Eupalinos visited by Cockburn on Samos.
- Musical scales were invented by Pythagoras in a process explained by Hart-Davis that he applied to the universe.
- The water organ was invented by Ctesibius of Alexandria using a device reconstructed by Jopsom that was the first to use compressed air.
- Mirrors were used by Archimedes in a process demonstrated by Jopsom to set fire to an enemy ship at Syracuse.
- Belly bow, demonstrated to Hart-Davis, was the first mechanical weapon and more powerful than a standard bow.
- Communication devices, such as those reconstructed by Jopsom, allowed the secure transmission of messages.
- Democracy was originally developed in the city of Athens visited by Cockburn.
- The kleroterion, reconstructed by Jopsom, secured the fair and democratic selection of juries.
- The high-tech stagecraft of Heron of Alexandria, reconstructed by Jopsom, included the first robot, steam engine and automatic doors.
- Ethylene was inhaled by the Oracle at Delphi, visited by Cockburn, prior to her predictions.
- Advanced astronomical theories, explained by Hart-Davis, were put forward by Pythagoras, Aristarchus of Samos and Eratosthenes.
- The antikythera mechanism, demonstrated to Hart-Davis, was the world's first computer.

=== Episode nine: The Britons ===
People have lived on these islands for hundreds of thousands of years; how much do we know about Britain's beginnings? This is Butser, a wonderful reconstruction of an ancient farm in Hampshire and here I am going to go back through the British ages: through the Iron Age, the Bronze Age, and the Stone Age. I'm setting out to show that the early Brits were well organized, spiritual and technologically advanced Europeans, long before the Romans came and changed everything.

— Adam Hart-Davis

This episode features reports from around the British Isles by Hart-Davis and Darling elaborated by demonstrations from Jopson and a variety of experts that examine the ideas and inventions of the Ancient Britons.

- Flint tools, like the 700,000-year-old flint hand-axe found on the Norfolk coast, are the earliest man-made tools.
- Settlements, like the 5,000-year-old Skara Brae visited by Hart-Davis, are the earliest known in Europe.
- Henges, like Woodhenge visited by Darling, indicate a rich spiritual life connected to the seasons.
- Solar observations, demonstrated by Hart-Davis, allowed the accurate charting of the passing seasons for agriculture.
- Bronze making, introduced by the beaker people and demonstrated by Hart-Davis, was the first man-made alloy.
- Roundhouses, demonstrated to Darling at the Peak Moors Centre, Somerset Levels, were unique in Europe.
- Gold artefacts, like those at the National Museum of Ireland visited by Darling, are amongst the finest in Europe.
- Sewn plank boats, such as the Dover Bronze Age Boat visited by Darling, could carry large cargos.
- Navigational techniques, using tools such as the Lead and Line demonstrated to Darling, allowed trade with Europe.
- Iron working, demonstrated to Darling, allowed the construction of weapons used in the first organised warfare.
- Coin making, introduced from Europe and demonstrated by Jopsom, records the earliest samples of writing in Britain.
- Chariot making, demonstrated to Darling by Robert Herford, provided a powerful weapon against the invading Romans.

== See also ==
- List of Islamic films
