= Paul Bradshaw (television) =

British television writer, director and producer

Paul Bradshaw is a British television writer, director and producer.

== Biography ==
Bradshaw began his career at the BBC in 1994 as part of the production team on Tomorrow's World, his first films were for the 1998 series Meet the Ancestors, followed by The Making of the Royal Institution Christmas Lectures and Journeys to the Bottom of the Sea.

He co-wrote and co-directed the 2006 series Nuremberg: Nazis on Trial that re-enacted the Nuremberg Trials of prominent Nazi war criminals.

He produced the 2007 documentary film Climate Change: Britain Under Threat.

== Filmography ==
- 1998 Meet the Ancestors producer & assistant director
- 2001 Blood of the Vikings series producer
- 2002 What the Tudors Did for Us series producer
- 2003 Timewatch producer & director
- 2004 Terry Jones' Medieval Lives series producer
- 2005 Egypt series producer
- 2006 Nuremberg: Nazis on Trial director & writer
- 2007 Climate Change: Britain Under Threat producer
- 2009 The Incredible Human Journey series producer
- 2011 The Animal's Guide to Britain series producer
- 2012 Secrets Of Our Living Planet series producer
- 2013 Ice Age Giants series producer
- 2014 Wonders of the Monsoon series producer
- 2016 Earth's Greatest Spectacles series producer
