= Alom Shaha =

Science teacher, author and film maker

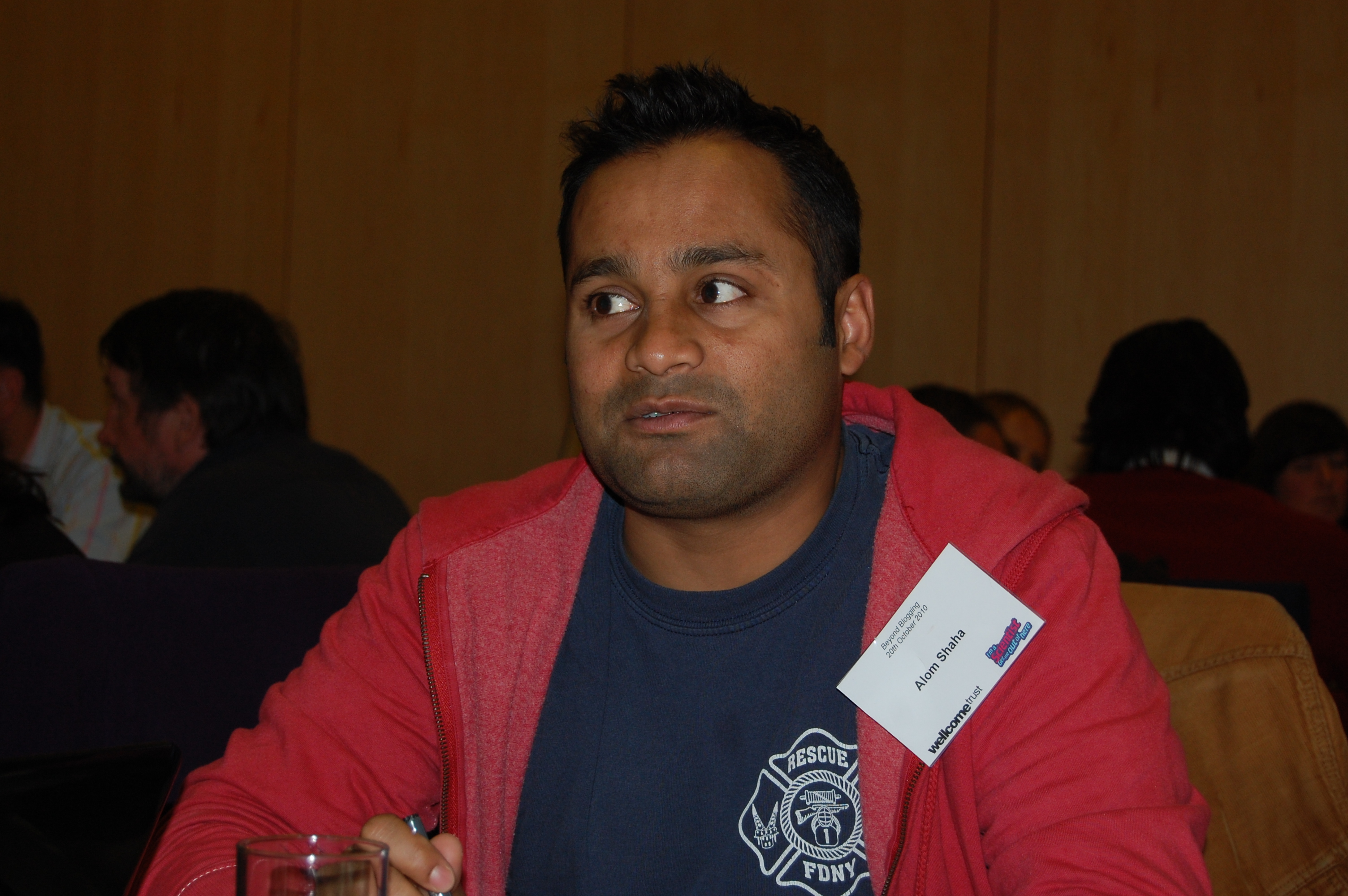
- Shaha at an event in 2010
- Born: 1973 (age 52–53); Bangladesh
- Education: University College London (BSc); Imperial College London (MSc); Goldsmiths, University of London (MA); King's College London (PGCE)
- Scientific career
- Workplaces: Camden School for Girls; Humanists UK; The Watford UTC; BBC; Royal Institution
- Website: alomshaha.com

Alom Shaha (born 1973) is a British-Bangladeshi science teacher, writer, and filmmaker. His books include The Young Atheist's Handbook: Lessons for Living a Good Life Without God, Mr Shaha's Recipes for Wonder: adventures in science round the kitchen table, and Mr Shaha's Marvellous Machines: adventures in making round the kitchen table. He has also written for The Guardian, The Big Issue, BBC Science Focus, New Humanist and New Scientist and spoken at events such as the Richmond Literature Festival and Cheltenham Science Festival.

== Education and early life ==
Shaha was born in Bangladesh and grew up in a Muslim family in the Elephant and Castle area of London where he developed an interest in atheism. He was educated at University College London where he was awarded a Bachelor of Science degree in physics, followed by Imperial College London (Master of Science degree in science communication), Goldsmiths, University of London (Master of Arts degree in creative writing and life writing and King's College London (Postgraduate Certificate in Education (PGCE) Physics).

== Career ==
Shaha is a teacher of physics. He taught at Camden School for Girls from 2008 to 2020 and The Watford UTC.

Shaha was elected a councillor in the 1998 Southwark London Borough Council election for the London Borough of Southwark for the Liberal Democrats.

Shaha is a patron of Humanists UK, who have sent his books to secondary schools in the UK. His work has been recognised by fellowships awarded by Nesta and the Nuffield Foundation, and was made an Honorary Fellow of the British Science Association in 2024. He has also worked on content creation for the BBC and the Royal Institution.

=== Popular science ===
Shaha has published books on popular science aimed at children, teenagers and their families including:

- Mr Shaha's Recipes for Wonder: adventures in science round the kitchen table
- Mr Shaha's Marvellous Machines: adventures in making round the kitchen table
- Why Don't Things Fall Up?: and Six Other Science Lessons You Missed at School
- How to Find a Rainbow

=== Textbooks ===
Shaha has co-authored textbooks on GCSE Science and A-Level Physics for the AQA examination board published by Oxford University Press:

- Oxford Revise: AQA GCSE Physics
- Oxford Revise: AQA A-Level Physics
- Oxford Revise: AQA GCSE Combined Science

=== Media ===
Alongside appearances on YouTube, Shaha's appearances on mainstream media have included:

- Science Shack
- What the Victorians Did for Us
- Horizon

== Personal life ==
Shaha speaks Sylheti fluently having been born in a small village in the Sylhet Division of Bangladesh.
