= Caroline van den Brul =

British TV documentary producer

Caroline van den Brul is a British television documentary producer and the author of Crackle and Fizz: Essential Communication and Pitching Skills for Scientists.

== Biography ==
Van den Brul worked at the BBC for twenty-five years on factual programming including QED, Horizon and Tomorrow's World, and in 2003 she was appointed creativity leader for the corporation.

She has received two BAFTA TV Award nominations, and in 2006 she was awarded an MBE, in the Queen's birthday honours list, for services to broadcasting.

She runs her own professional training company called Creativity by Design.

== Filmography ==
- Royal Institution Christmas Lectures, 1994 -1999, executive producer
- Hospital Watch, 1995, executive producer
- Morning Surgery, 1995, executive producer
- Meet the Ancestors (1998), executive producer
- Supernatural Science (1999), executive producer
- What the Romans Did for Us (2000), executive producer
- Blood of the Vikings (2001), executive producer
- What the Victorians Did for Us (2001), executive producer
- What the Tudors Did for Us (2002), executive producer
- Our Top Ten Treasures (2003), executive producer

== Bibliography ==
- van den Brul, Caroline (2014). Crackle and Fizz: Essential Communication and Pitching Skills for Scientists. Imperial College Press. ISBN 978-1-78326-284-7.
- 1994. 6th Guardian Lecture, Public Perceptions of Science: How scientists and others view the media reporting of science. Published by Nuffield College, Oxford,
- Van den Brul, Caroline; & Spindler, Susan (1984). Tomorrow's World: Food. BBC Books (paperback). ISBN 978-0-563-20305-6.
