= Meet the Ancestors =

- BBC Book Cover
- Genre: Documentary
- Presented by: Julian Richards
- Country of origin: United Kingdom
- Original language: English

Production
- Executive producer: Caroline van den Brul
- Producer: Ian Potts
- Running time: 30 minutes

Original release
- Release: 8 January 1998

Related
- Blood of the Vikings

Meet the Ancestors (later Ancestors) is a BBC Television documentary series first broadcast in 1998. It documented the archaeological excavation and scientific reconstruction of human remains. The series was introduced by archaeologist Julian Richards and often included facial reconstructions by Caroline Wilkinson.

A follow-up to the series, Stories from the Dark Earth: Meet the Ancestors Revisited, was broadcast in 2014 on BBC Four.

== Companion book ==
- Richards, Julian (7 January 1999). Meet the Ancestors. BBC Books (hardcover). ISBN 978-0-563-38458-8.

== Notes ==
- The series was renamed Ancestors for its seventh season.

== Episodes ==
=== Series one (1998) ===
No.	Title	Location	Directed by	Original release date
1	"The Wolf Den"	Yorkshire Dales	Unknown	8 January 1998
Richards investigates the discovery of a subterranean chamber discovered by two pot-holing divers, Andrew Goddard and Phil Murphy, in the Yorkshire Dales which contains human remains from the Bronze Age and visits a cave in which a prehistoric footprint has been unearthed.
2	"The Lady of the Sands"	Donegal	Unknown	15 January 1998
Richards investigates a bulldozer-operator's discovery of bodies cremated almost 2,000 years ago on a beach near Donegal, providing an insight into the lives and deaths of Ireland's first Christians.
3	"Friends, Romans or Countrymen?"	Bristol	Unknown	22 January 1998
Richards joins a team excavating a large sarcophagus from a Bristol burial site discovered by a bulldozer-operator which could shed light on the Roman lifestyle.
4	"The Rose Garden Mystery"	Malmesbury Abbey	Unknown	29 January 1998
Richards investigates the remains of a body dating from Saxon times, discovered in the grounds of Malmesbury Abbey, which could be the final resting place of King Athelstan.
5	"Bones in the Barnyard"	Somerset	Unknown	5 February 1998
Richards investigates remains of two crouched bodies discovered in a remote Somerset village that DNA experts link with the Iron Age.

=== Series two (1999) ===
No.	Title	Location	Directed by	Original release date
6	"Warrior"	Suffolk	Unknown	7 January 1999
Richards investigates an Anglo-Saxon grave on a U.S. Air Force base in Suffolk, where the remains of a warrior in full battle regalia have been discovered alongside the bodies of his horse and a number of children apparently bearing weapons.
7	"At the Sign of the Eagle"	Winchester	Unknown	14 January 1999
Richards investigates the priceless contents of a fourth-century lead sarcophagus found in a Roman cemetery in Winchester, which gives unexpected clues to the pagan beliefs of its wealthy occupant.
8	"The Ultimate Sacrifice"	Dorset	Unknown	6 February 2001
Richards contemplates the gruesome fate of a Neolithic woman and three children whose remains were discovered in a Stone Age temple. Bones and teeth reveal a dark tale of these prehistoric wanderers, who may have made the ultimate sacrifice 5,000 years ago.
9	"The Tomb That Time Forgot"	Orkney	Unknown	28 January 1999
Richards joins a team of police officers and archaeologists to investigate the secrets of the past in a Stone Age burial chamber containing the remains of four people recently discovered in an Orkney barley field.
10	"Living with the Ancestors"	Winterbourne Gunner, Salisbury	Unknown	4 February 1999
Richards and the team visit a couple's home built over a fifth-century graveyard in Winterbourne Gunner, near Salisbury. Under the garage they are surprised to discover a male skeleton which may be that of an Ancient Briton.
11	"The Black Hand"	Chester	Unknown	11 February 1999
Richards investigates the discovery of a human jawbone in a Chester field, which led to the unearthing of a 12th-century chapel and the remains of medieval landowners. As archaeologists piece together the clues to present a Hampshire teacher with an image of his ancestors.

=== Specials (1999) ===
No.	Title	Location	Directed by	Original release date
Special	"Coventry: A Family Plot"	TBA	Unknown	17 April 1999
Richards helps an archaeological team remove three burials locked within a 19th-century vault, as an old cemetery is cleared for redevelopment near to the ruins of Coventry's blitzed cathedral. The discoveries help piece together the history of a family who lived more than 150 years ago and reflect the changing fortunes of the city.
Special	"The Princess and the Pauper Part 1. The Pauper of Spitalfield"	Spitalfields, London	Unknown	18 September 1999
Julian Richards presents a look at the excavation of Spitalfields in London, the site of a huge medieval monastery that cared for the sick and poor.
Special	"The Princess and the Pauper Part 2. Princess of the City"	Spitalfields, London	Unknown	18 September 1999
Richards investigates the significance of the archaeological dig at Spitalfields where experts have uncovered an elaborate Roman sarcophagus with a decorated lead coffin inside, and remnants of clothing and objects never before found in Britain.

=== Series three (2000) ===
No.	Title	Location	Directed by	Original release date
13	"Treasures of the Dark Age"	Peterborough	Unknown	20 January 2001
Richards investigates a burial ground in Peterborough unearthing artefacts from first and second-generation Anglians who settled in Britain, including bronze brooches, silver rings, amber beads and strange ivory objects.
14	"The Lost Souls"	Wing, Buckinghamshire	Unknown	27 January 2000
Richards recruits local schoolchildren to investigate a mysterious burial ground found among the foundations of the Victorian village school in Buckinghamshire. The project provides a revealing insight into the history of the area and the people who lived there a thousand years ago.
15	"The French Connection"	Guernsey	Unknown	3 February 2000
Richards investigates the lives of three men whose remains were found on an island just off the coast of Guernsey to find out how they ended up in such a desolate place, and whether they could have been monks.
17	"The Domesday Fire"	Cambridgeshire	Unknown	10 February 2000
Richards examines the remains of a medieval execution victim discovered in one of 600 graves surrounding a ruined Saxon church in Cambridgeshire.
18	"Hunter of the Plain"	Salisbury	Unknown	17 February 2000
Richards investigates a rare Bronze Age grave on the Army's vast training ground on Salisbury Plain dating from the time of nearby Stonehenge to recreate a prehistoric bow and arrow to find out just how skilled and deadly this hunter might have been.

=== Canterbury special (2000) ===
No.	Title	Location	Directed by	Original release date
Special	"Skeleton in the Crypt: The Pilgrim Trade"	Canterbury	Unknown	7 October 2000
Professor John R. Butler investigates the mysterious disappearance of the remains of murdered Archbishop of Canterbury St Thomas Becket, killed by Henry II's soldiers in 1170. How much truth is there in the popular belief that he was cremated and his ashes scattered during the Reformation? Plus, an examination of the town of Canterbury itself as a place of pilgrimage and tourism.

=== Series four (2001) ===
No.	Title	Location	Directed by	Original release date
19	"The Killing Field"	Gloucestershire	Unknown	9 January 2001
Richards investigates a field where a mass of ancient bones was unearthed in 1968. The team slowly piece together evidence of a battle that took place more than 3,000 years ago, and build up a surprising picture.
20	"The Bishop's Men"	Hereford Cathedral	Unknown	16 January 2001
Richards investigates a medieval burial site unearthed beneath the walls of Hereford Cathedral that revealed six skeletons clutching chalices and patens, suggesting they were priests and pieces together a picture of their lifestyles, which included pilgrimages, drinking and womanising.
21	"The Chosen One"	Bourton-on-the-Water	Unknown	22 January 2001
Richards investigates the seemingly bound body of an Iron Age teenage girl found in a rubbish heap in the Cotswold village of Bourton-on-the-Water to reconstruct her life more than 2,500 years ago.
22	"A Roman Plot"	Bath	Unknown	29 January 2001
Richards explores the stories behind two Roman burial sites excavated in the centre of Bath. He attempts to discover why the deceased were laid to rest contrary to normal Roman custom with one actually placed in a lead coffin and he retraces events from the time when Christianity was gradually taking root in Britain to the final days of Roman rule.
23	"Winds of Change"	Bamburgh Dunes, Northumberland	Unknown	5 February 2001
Richards investigates six Anglo-Saxon graves in the sand dunes near Bamburgh Castle, which could provide an insight into the life of King Oswald of Bernicia. Initially discovered when a storm exposed some remains in 1817, it is only recently that archaeologists have found the complete burial ground.
24	"The Architect, the Clerk and the Money"	St Paul's Cathedral	Unknown	12 February 2001
Richards explores the life of Lawrence Spencer, clerk of works to Christopher Wren during the construction of St Paul's Cathedral. His devotion to the task earned him the right to be buried under the south transept of what is arguably the country's finest neoclassical building.

=== Series five (2002) ===
No.	Title	Location	Directed by	Original release date
25	"Chariot Queen"	Wetwang, East Riding of Yorkshire	Unknown	19 February 2002
Richards investigates the discovery of a grave containing the body of tallest Iron Age woman ever found in Britain and a dismantled chariot, a find which caused great excitement and speculation among archaeologists. Initial theories suggested the woman must have been a Celtic princess, but the realisation that the carriage was intended for battle led experts to conclude they must be the remains of a warrior queen similar to the celebrated Boudicca.
26	"Malaria and the Fall of Rome"	Lugano, Italy	TBA	TBA
Richards and the team visit an archaeological site where the bodies of 47 babies and children were recently excavated. The discovery that the youngsters died from malaria has given rise to the theory that the fall of one of history's greatest empires was in part due to an epidemic : so when a fleet of Roman cargo ships are discovered deliberately sunk in mysterious circumstances at a site in Sardinia, the experts arrive hoping to find conclusive evidence.
27	"The Forgotten Battlefield"	Ypres, Flanders	TBA	TBA
Richards pieces together the story of life on the World War I front line as amateur archaeologists unearth a complex system of trenches, an exceptional array of military hardware and an astonishing collection of personal artefacts either forgotten or discarded at the end of the conflict.
28	"The Lost Palace of Hampton Court"	Hampton Court Palace	TBA	TBA
Richards joins a team as they start to dig within the walls of Hampton Court Palace for evidence to support the assistant curator's theory that the original palace built by Cardinal Wolsey, largely obliterated by Henry VIII, may have Italian Renaissance roots, thus making it one of the most significant buildings in English architectural history.
29	"Slave Island"	Manhattan, New York	TBA	TBA
Richards investigates how the 1991 discovery of a forgotten burial ground in Manhattan shed new light on the history of slavery in America. Archaeological evidence has exploded the myth that New York had always been a 'free' state, revealing the crucial role played by African-Americans in the city's development and prosperity.
30	"Celtic Causeway"	Lincolnshire	Unknown	27 March 2002
Richards looks at how the discovery of the remains of an ancient trackway in the fenlands of Lincolnshire has thrown new light on the rituals of the Iron Age. Made of wooden posts some five metres long, the track ran over marshy ground to the open water and was no ordinary thoroughfare. This was a place were the Celts went to worship their deities.

=== New Year special (2003) ===
No.	Title	Location	Directed by	Original release date
Special	"Our Top Ten Treasures"	British Museum	Patricia Wheatley	1 January 2003
Adam Hart-Davies profiles the 10 most important treasures ever unearthed in Britain as voted by a panel of experts from the British Museum.

=== Series six (2003) ===
No.	Title	Location	Directed by	Original release date
31	"Napoleon's Lost Army"	Vilnius, Lithuania	Unknown	4 February 2003
Richards investigates the remains of the soldiers of Napoleon's army, discovered in a mass grave near Vilnius provide a new perspective on the final days of the dictator's military forces as they attempted to conquer Russia in 1812. Modern technology reveals the varied nationalities of many of the fallen soldiers, while lavish reconstructions of the final battles illustrate one of the greatest disasters in military history.
32	"Desert Rescue"	TBA	Unknown	12 February 2003
A British team travel deep into the inhospitable Sahara desert to find out what remains of a Hermes airliner forced to crash-land in May 1952, when it ran out of fuel 1,300 miles off course. Using official documents and testimony from the surviving crew and passengers, the final hours of the doomed plane are pieced together.
33	"King of Stonehenge"	Stonehenge	Unknown	19 February 2003
Richards investigates a grave found a few miles from Stonehenge on Salisbury Plain, believed to be the richest Bronze Age burial ever found, owing to the quantity of riches with which the man was buried. The team attempt to find more clues to his identity, and with the haul including the earliest metal objects found in Britain, piece together clues about life for people so far back in time.
34	"Britain's Oldest House"	Calleva Atrebatum, Hampshire	Unknown	26 February 2003
Richards joins archaeologist Clive Waddington and his team as they unearth evidence of Stone Age communities dating back 10,000 years. Advanced dating techniques and analysis build up a picture of what life was like in 8600 BC, revealing that the people of the time were sophisticated settlers with a system of beliefs and the ability to exploit the landscape to suit their own needs.
35	"The Lost City of Roman Britain"	Sahara	Unknown	5 March 2003
Richards uncovers the mysteries of the recently-discovered missing city of Calleva Atrebatum in Hampshire. All that now remains of it is a wall enclosing 100 hectares of empty fields, but with advanced computer graphics to fill in the gaps, the programme rebuilds Calleva, asking why it was abandoned. Supported by current findings, it proves that in its time, Calleva was a city of significance and then goes in search of the reasons for its ultimate demise.
36	"The Mummies of Cladh Hallan"	TBA	Unknown	18 March 2003
One of the UK's foremost archaeologists reveals what he claims are the first British mummies ever discovered, dating back 3,000 years to the Bronze Age. Overcoming conventional thinking will prove a major problem, but, if his evidence stands up to scientific scrutiny, the perspective on the ancient Britons will be changed for ever.

=== Series seven (2004) ===
No.	Title	Location	Directed by	Original release date
37	"Nelson's Forgotten Heroes"	Aboukir Bay, Egypt	TBA	TBA
Nick Slope's investigation into an archaeological dig on a tiny island which may have uncovered human remains connected to Horatio Nelson's 1798 victory against Napoleon at the Battle of the Nile. Forensic evidence is combined with information from ships' logs and personal memoirs from the time in a bid to identify bodies and paint a picture of life in Nelson's fleet.
38	"Billy and the Fighter Boys"	TBA	TBA	TBA
Richards investigates the story of the fighter pilots of No 1 Squadron, who flew their Hurricanes against the Luftwaffe in the Battle of France during May 1940. Fighter ace Billy Drake was forced to bail out of his plane over eastern France, and, 63 years later, returns to the site where, with the help of a team of aviation archaeologists, he is reunited with its shattered remains.
39	"The Hunt for Darwin's Beagle"	Essex	Unknown	28 February 2004
Richards follows marine archaeologist Robert Prescott and scientist Colin Pillinger in their bid to find the final resting place of HMS Beagle, the ship made famous by naturalist Charles Darwin's voyages of discovery. Old maps and previous digs provide clues to the vessel's final resting place, and a remote-sensing survey at a secret location in the Essex marshes reveals the remains of a 90ft hull.
40	"The Curse of Oxford Gaol"	Oxford	TBA	TBA
Richards reports from a dig where human skeletons hundreds of years old were discovered by builders excavating the ground outside the prison. The remains of more than 30 people, including a hanged teenager, a child whose legs were bent double and a severed head, were found at the site, and some believe that these skeletons prove the existence of a legendary curse dating back to 1577.
41	"The Stonehenge Enigma"	Stonehenge	TBA	TBA
Richards examines the detective work which has taken place over the past 300 years and gives enthusiasts a clearer understanding of Stonehenge. An expert on the enigmatic standing stones himself, Richards shares the latest evidence, including forensic tests on a skeleton found at the site. He then reveals how they were erected as revolutionary cultural changes were sweeping Europe, leaving behind a timeless monument to one of the major turning points in human history.
42	"Journey to Hell"	France	TBA	TBA
Wilfred Owen's nephew travels to the site of the Heidenkopf in northern France, an abandoned German front-line trench which was relentlessly bombed during the war poet's two-day ordeal in January 1917. With the help of trench map expert Peter Chasseaud, historians Paul Reed, Andy Robertshaw and Nigel Jones, plus a team of archaeologists, the dig unearths the remains of three soldiers and the entrance to a dug-out.
