= Towner Eastbourne =

Art gallery in Eastbourne, England

Coordinates: 50.76278°N 0.282947°E

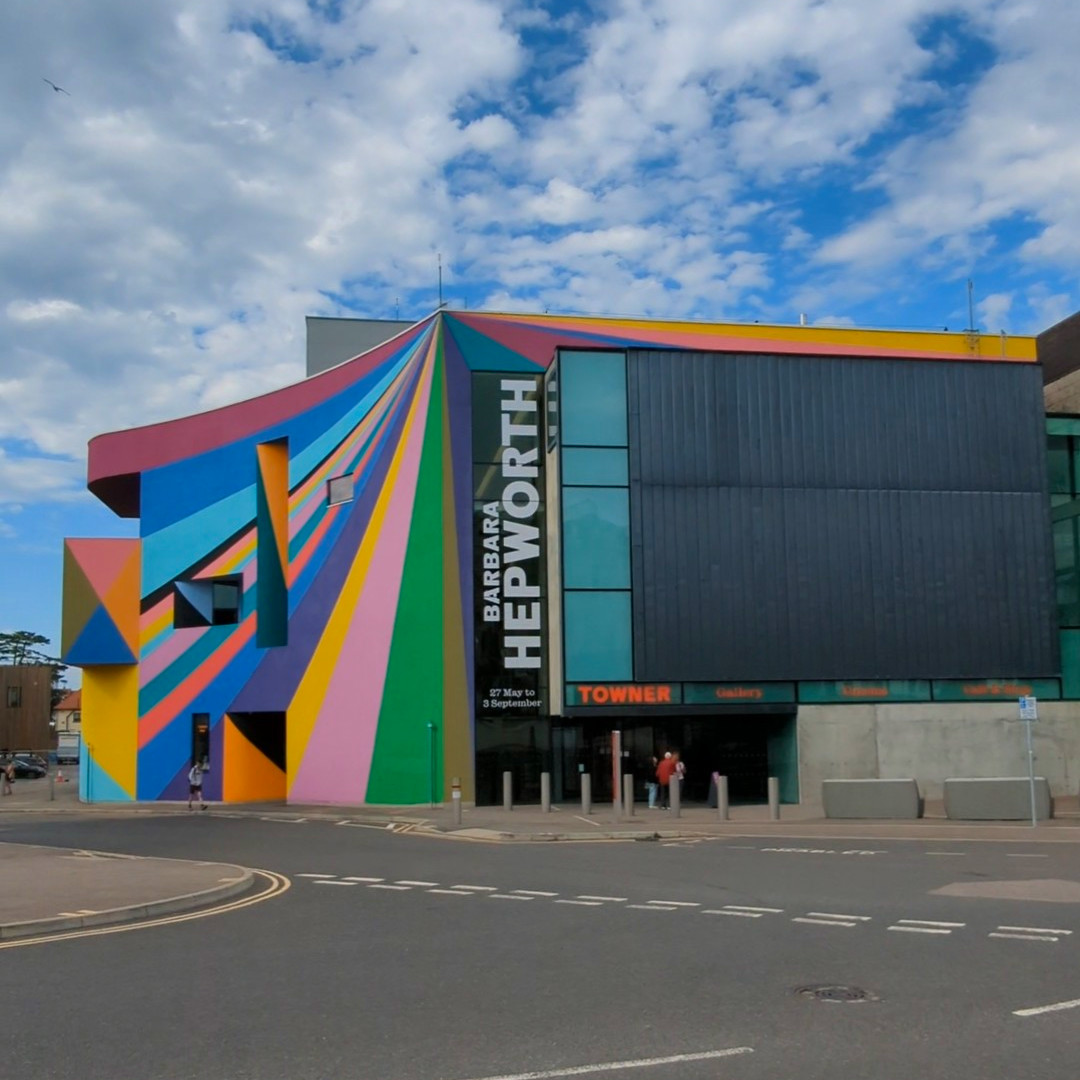
- Established: 1920 (bequest)
- Location: College Road, Eastbourne, East Sussex
- Visitors: 110,000 (2012)
- Website: www.townereastbourne.org.uk

Towner Eastbourne (formerly Towner Art Gallery) is an art gallery located in Eastbourne, East Sussex, on the south coast of England. The gallery hosts one of the most significant public art collections in the South of England and draws over 100,000 visitors a year. It was described by ITV News as "the region's biggest art gallery" in 2017.

It was established with a bequest in 1920, from John Chisholm Towner who had served as a local alderman. It was first homed in Manor Gardens, adjacent to Gildredge Park in the Old Town area of Eastbourne. Opening there in 1923, it closed when the building was sold in 2005. In 2009, it re-opened in a purpose-built facility adjacent to the Congress Theatre, near Eastbourne's seafront. The venue will host the 2023 Turner Prize.

== History ==
The Towner Gallery was established as a project in 1920 following the death that year of Alderman John Chisholm Towner, who left 22 paintings, £6,000 and instructions for the establishment of an art gallery. This bequest was made for the benefit of the people of Eastbourne; the undertaking was entrusted to a local group of supporters and the local council.

=== 1923 opening ===
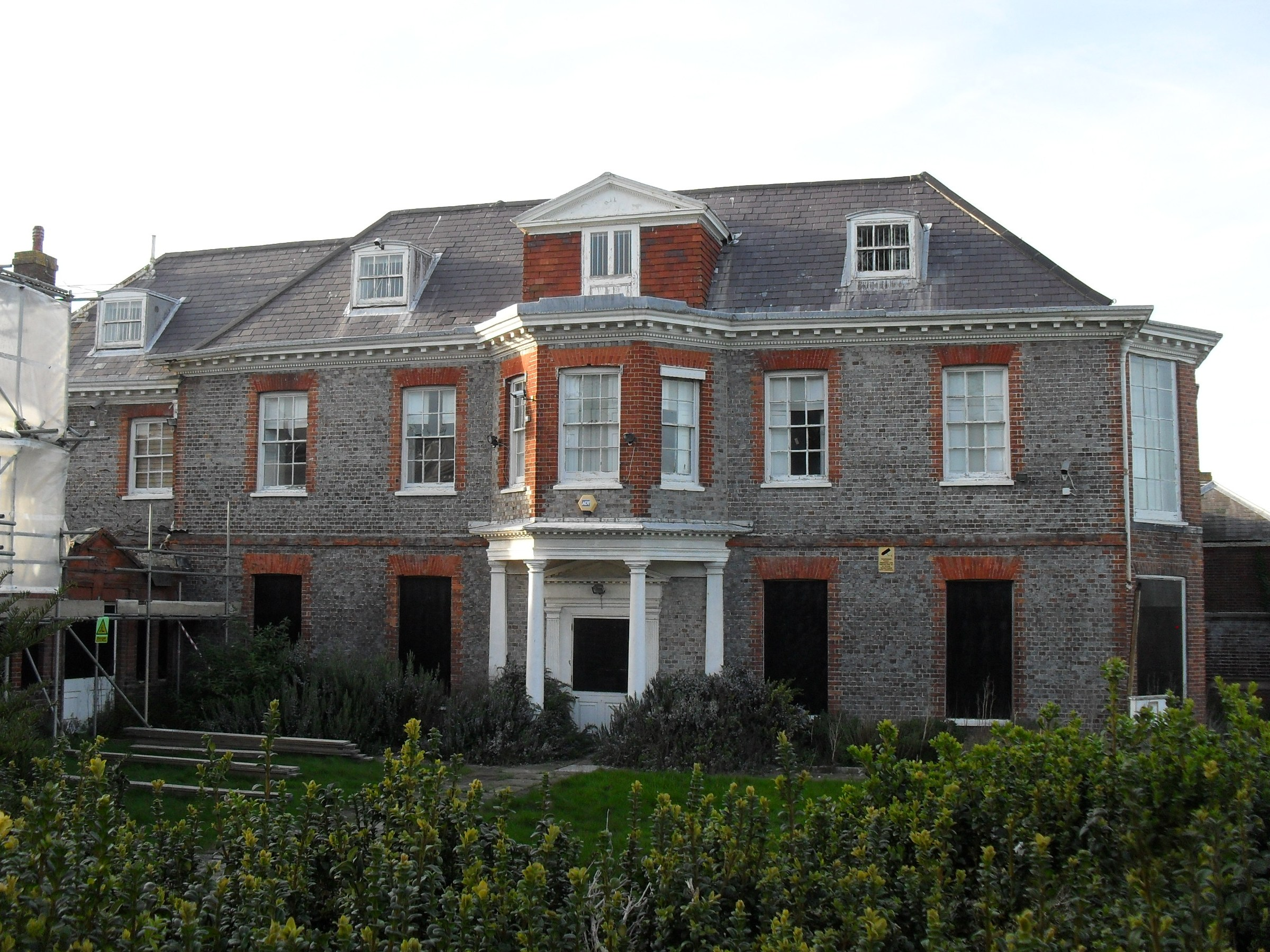
The gallery was originally based in The Manor House.

For 72 years, the Gallery was located within a manor house on the High Street in the Old Town area. The Manor House, located within its own manor gardens, dated to the 18th century, but was taken over in the 1920s for use as a public gallery and local museum, following Towner's bequest.

A noted historic building in Eastbourne, the Manor House is dwarfed in age by its neighbours — the Lamb Inn, dating back to 1180AD, and St Mary's Church from the same period. Despite having been owned by the town as a public facility for most of the 20th century, the Manor House and gardens were sold in 2005/6 by the local authority, Eastbourne Borough Council.

=== 2005–2009: no gallery or museum ===
In 2009, after a gap of several years during which Eastbourne had no local art gallery or museum, Towner reopened in a purpose-built gallery building adjacent to the Congress Theatre. Funders of the new gallery included the Heritage Lottery Fund and Eastbourne Borough Council.

=== 2009: new building ===
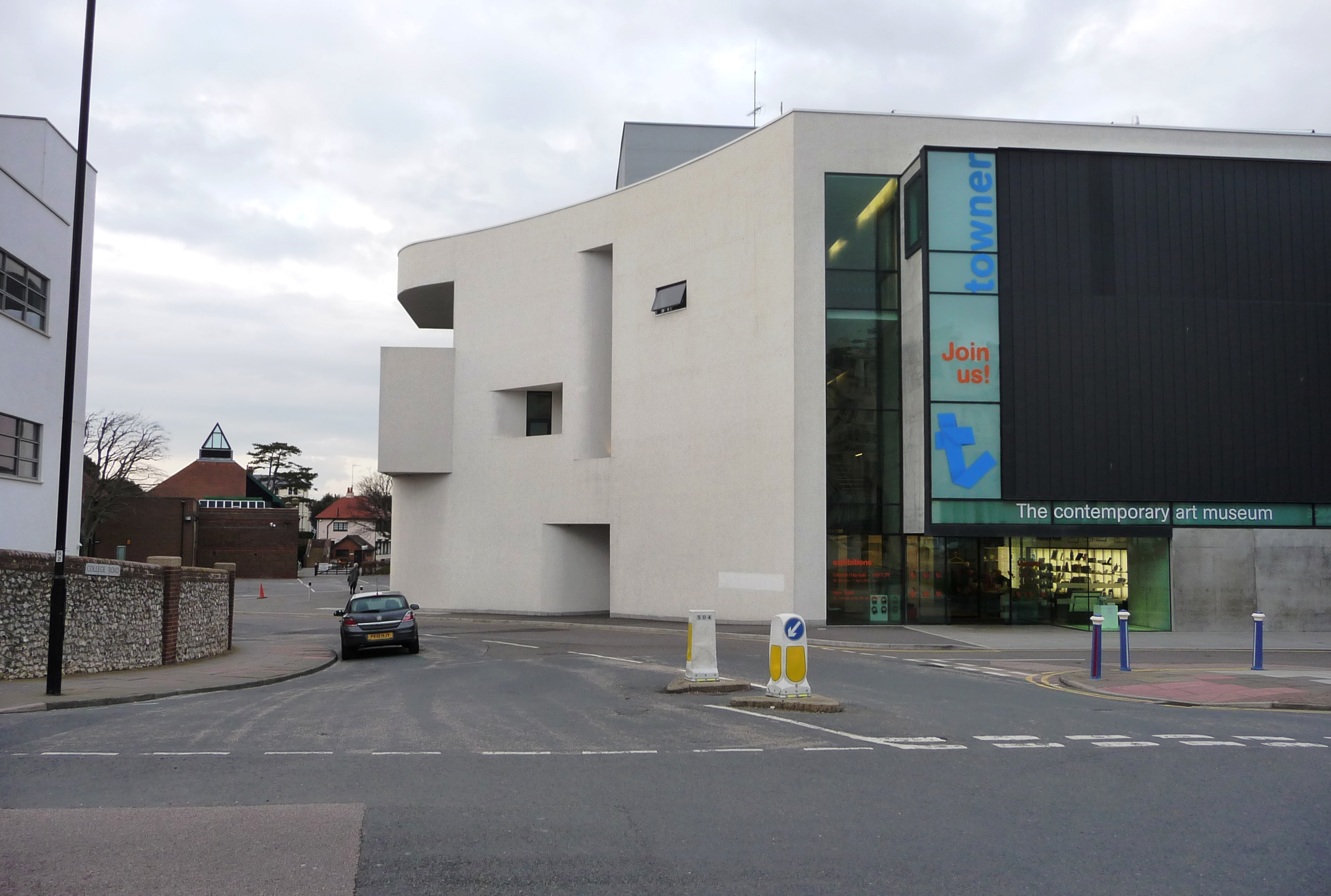
The current building in which the gallery is located is joined onto the Congress Theatre

Designed by Rick Mather Architects and built mainly from concrete, at a cost of £8.6m, the new gallery building was planned to be more easily accessible to the public and to store the 4,000 works of the growing collection in a safe and climate-controlled manner. Visually, it was designed to reflect the chalk cliffs of the Eastbourne Downs.

Unlike the old building, no provision was made to incorporate a local museum, though substantially more space was created for a café, shop and larger exhibitions.

=== 2014: transfer of ownership from Eastbourne Borough Council ===
In 2014, Eastbourne Borough Council transferred operation of the Gallery to a newly-created independent charitable trust. David Dimbleby was appointed the Chair of Trustees. The Council retained ownership of the Gallery's building and its collection of artworks.

=== 2017: threats of closure ===
Despite no longer directly operating the Gallery, Eastbourne Borough Council remained a major annual funder, alongside Arts Council England.

In 2017, cuts in the local authority's funding of 50% were proposed. This threatened the gallery with closure to some or all of its services and the greater use of admission charges for access to public art.

=== 2019–2022: Exterior mural and refurbishment ===
In 2019, German artist Lothar Götz was chosen from a call out to design a mural for the building's exterior. Götz transformed the exterior walls of the gallery with his large-scale, colourful geometric artwork, Dance Diagonal.

From 2021 to 2022 the Gallery significantly remodelled its ground floor and cinema to "improve the visitor experience, build visitor engagement and increase Towner’s financial sustainability." Design was led by architects Manalo & White.

== The Towner Collection ==
The Towner Collection is one of the most significant public art collections in the South East of England.

It holds more than 5,000 works of art by historic, modern, and contemporary artists including Lawrence Alma-Tadema, John Gascoigne Lake, Vanessa Bell, David Bomberg, Alan Davie, Tacita Dean, Olafur Eliasson, Anya Gallaccio, Thomas Jones, Peter Liversidge, Harold Mockford, Henry Moore, Cedric Morris, William Nicholson, Julian Opie, Ian Potts, Victor Pasmore, Pablo Picasso, Eric Ravilious, Eric Slater, Wolfgang Tillmans, Alfred Wallis, Christopher Wood, Joseph Wright of Derby and Carol Wyatt.

The initial collection consisted mainly of Victorian narrative painting, especially pictures of animals and children. The current collection now includes oil paintings, watercolours, works on paper, etchings, prints, sculpture, wood cuts, ceramic objects, installations and video art.

Since the gallery was established it has received donations of work by artists including Walter Sickert, Pablo Picasso, Henry Moore, Victor Pasmore, Alfred Wallis, Frances Hodgkins, Phelan Gibb and David Bomberg.

By 1962 the Observer said it was "the most go-ahead municipal gallery of its size in the country". This was mainly because of the purchase of a group of works by modern abstract artists of the 1950s and 1960s. In 1962, the Rector of Berwick Church gave over 35 studies and sketches for the Berwick Church murals.

As a result of the first curator's ‘Pictures of Sussex’ policy the Towner Collection gradually increased. Pictures were acquired of subjects relating to Sussex. This scheme was later extended to allow inclusion of pictures executed by Sussex artists regardless of subject matter.

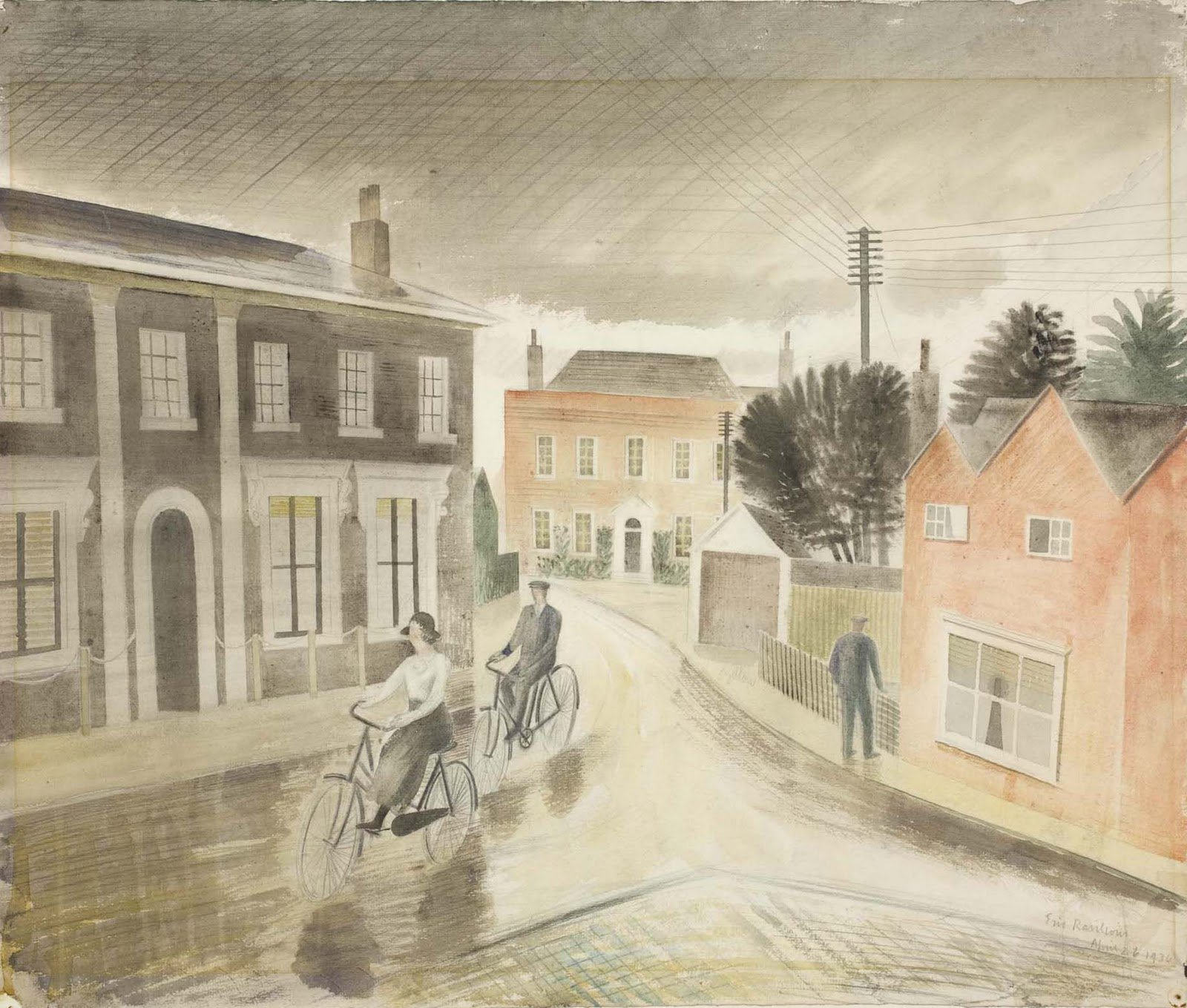
Village Street by Eric Ravilious (1936) is in the gallery's collection

A key element of the collection is the work of Eric Ravilious, who studied and taught at Eastbourne School of Art. In 1982, the family of the artist deposited on loan a large body of his work. The Towner holds the broadest collection of paintings, illustrations and commercial designs by Ravilious in the world.

In 2023 Towner Eastbourne partnered with iniva (Institute of International Visual Arts) for the third and final year of Future Collect, a project to reimagine the future of public collections to better reflect a culturally diverse society.
