= What the Stuarts Did for Us =

- Genre: Documentary
- Presented by: Adam Hart-Davis
- Composer: David Mitcham
- Country of origin: United Kingdom
- Original language: English
- No. of series: 1
- No. of episodes: 4

Production
- Producer: Paul King
- Editor: Maggie Ward
- Running time: 23 minutes

Original release
- Network: BBC Two
- Release: 21 October – 11 November 2002

What the Stuarts Did for Us is a 2002 BBC documentary series that examines the impact of the Stuart period on modern society.

== Episodes ==
=== Episode one: Desygner Livinge ===
In the beginning of the Stuart Period a curious new device appeared, it looks like a church bell but in fact it's an exercise machine. This machine was one of many trendy new ideas that enhanced the life style of the Stuarts. It was the beginning of designer living.

— Adam Hart-Davis

Hart-Davis travels around Britain to introduce the idea and inventions of the Stuart Period in architecture and life-style.

- Neo-classical architecture was introduced to London by Inigo Jones and Christopher Wren following the Great Fire of London.
- The fountain pen was first mentioned in the diaries of Samuel Pepys and it allowed him to write on the move.
- Coffee houses drew people from far and wide with their pleasant smell and allowed sober social intercourse.
- Gyms were born from bell-ringing clubs with dumbbells invented for those that could not make it to the church towers.
- Colourfast dyes were created in Britain's first chemical works at Ravenscar when supplies of the mordant alum were cut off.
- The three-piece suit and necktie were created by Charles II as a political weapon in his war against France.

=== Episode two: The Applyance of Science ===
Before Stuart times the man who really ruled the scientific roost was the Greek philosopher Aristotle, even if he had been dead for 2000 years. But by the 1600s his ideas were becoming discredited and the Stuarts needed a new approach to understanding nature.

— Adam Hart-Davis

Hart-Davis travels around Britain to introduce the idea and inventions of the Stuart Period in science and engineering.

- Experimental science was introduced by the Lord Chancellor Francis Bacon who died inventing the frozen chicken.
- Properties of gases investigated by Robert Boyle and Richard Towneley led to Denis Papin's invention of the pressure cooker.
- The steam engine was invented by Thomas Newcomen to drain water from the coalmines of the Midlands.
- The pendulum clock based on Galileo's principles was invented by Christiaan Huygens and led to the establishment of GMT.
- Principia by Isaac Newton established three simple laws that revolutionised our view of the universe.

=== Episode three: The Organysed Isle ===
Travel by coach was all the rage for the Stuarts and once regular public transport had filled the road with traffic, thieves like Moll [Cutpurse] were guaranteed a regular income. She was just one entrepreneur profiting from a Britain that was more organised than ever before.

— Adam Hart-Davis

Hart-Davis travels around Britain to introduce the idea and inventions of the Stuart Period in economics and politics.

- The Union Flag was designed for King James who united the kingdoms of England and Scotland into Great Britain.
- Public transport was introduced to England by Captain Bailey who standardised fares and issued licences for London Hackney Carriage.
- Road signs and the first road atlas by John Ogilvy further revolutionised the transport system and standardised the mile.
- The seed drill allowed Jethro Tull to put his revolutionary new planting techniques into practice leading to modern agriculture.
- The Fire Office of Nicholas Barbon led to the development of the first professional fire service.
- The Bank of England founded by William Paterson led to the creation of paper money and the national debt.
- The constitutional monarchy introduced following the restoration of Charles II is the backbone of the UK's modern political system.

=== Episode four: Newe Worldes ===
In a Dutch spectacle shop a chap called Zacharias Jantzen looked through two lenses at once and got the shock of his life, he was seeing the world in super-close-up. Jantzen had made the first microscope, giving the Stuarts a window into an entirely new miniature world.

— Adam Hart-Davis

Hart-Davis travels around Britain to introduce the idea and inventions of the Stuart Period in science and science-fiction.

- The microscope as refined by Robert Hook and Antonie van Leeuwenhoek allowed the microscopic world to be viewed in detail.
- The diving bell as refined by Edmund Halley allowed the investigation of the depths of the ocean.
- Lunar observations of John Wilkins based on the previous observations of Galileo challenged long held views of the heavens.
- The micrometer devised by William Gascoigne proved Johannes Kepler's theories of elliptical planetary motion.
- Science-fiction was developed through the imaginations of Cyrano de Bergerac and Bishop Francis Godwin.
