= What the Tudors Did for Us =

- Genre: Documentary
- Presented by: Adam Hart-Davis
- Composer: David Mitcham
- Country of origin: United Kingdom
- Original language: English
- No. of series: 1
- No. of episodes: 4

Production
- Producers: Caroline van den Brul; Stephen Wilkinson; Billie Pink; Paul Bradshaw
- Running time: 23 minutes

Original release
- Network: BBC Two
- Release: 23 September – 14 October 2002

What the Tudors Did for Us is a 2002 BBC documentary series that examines the impact of the Tudor period on modern society.

== Episodes ==
=== Episode one: Seeing the World ===
Before Tudor times the image people had of their world was, well, rather dark and mysterious, but that was about to change thanks to some incredible adventures and remarkable discoveries.

— Adam Hart-Davis

Hart-Davis travels around Britain to introduce the idea and inventions of the Tudor Age in art, optics and exploration.

- Wad (graphite) discovered by shepherds in the mid 16th century was used as the first pencil leading to life drawing and realistic portraiture.
- The lens was added to the camera obscura by Giambattista della Porta in Natural Magic leading to fine arts and the first cinema.
- Mainland North America was discovered by John Cabot and possibly named after his investor Richard Americ.
- The first atlas (flat map) was drawn by Gerardus Mercator using the Mercator projection demonstrated by Hart-Davis.
- The first British colony in America was founded by Sir Walter Raleigh at Roanoke opening the New World to the Tudors.
- The perspective glass invented by Leonard Digges and demonstrated by Hart-Davis may have been the first telescope.

=== Episode two: The Thinkynge Revolution ===
One night in 1572 the Elizabethan astronomer Thomas Diggs saw a bright new star in the sky. It was a real shock; it shouldn't have been there. The Tudors believed that heaven, where God lived, was perfect and unchanging, and the appearance of this bright new star completely undermined their whole system of belief. But there was worse, that observation wasn't just quietly recorded it rapidly became common knowledge thanks to a really dangerous piece of high technology, the printing press. News of that star was just one of a load of ideas that were going to turn the Tudor world upside-down.

— Adam Hart-Davis

Hart-Davis travels around Britain to introduce the idea and inventions of the Tudor Age in science, literature and education.

- The first printing press, like the one recreated at St Bride Printing Library, was brought to England by William Caxton.
- The resulting printing revolution included William Tyndale's English bible that lead to the standardisation of the English language.
- State education was founded by Henry VIII providing opportunities for Christopher Marlowe and William Harvey amongst others.
- Human anatomy was revolutionised by Andreas Vesalius following the legalisation of human dissection by Henry VIII.
- Modern medicine began from the Swiss Alchemist Paracelsus' belief that minerals and chemicals could be used to treat diseases.
- Observational science came of age when Thomas Diggs recorded the first observation of a supernova.
- The first flushing toilet was in Elizabeth II's palace

=== Episode three: The Goode Lyfe ===
In a climate of domestic peace England prospered; wealthy Tudor homeowners could worry less about defence and more about comfort.

— Adam Hart-Davis

Hart-Davis travels around Britain showing how domestic life developed during Tudor times.

- Interior design, using the example of Hardwick Hall: the layout of separate rooms with dedicated functions – instead of one great hall, upholstered furniture, wallpaper, carpets, and windows.
- The invention of the flush toilet by John Harington.
- The foundation of the Royal Exchange, London by Sir Thomas Gresham, and in particular the associated two floors of shops, characterised as the world's first mall.
- The popularising of sports including real tennis and horse racing.
- Adding hops to small beer thereby increasing the alcohol content.
- The invention of the knitting machine by William Lee.
