= Bamburgh Dunes =

Region of dunes

- Site of Special Scientific Interest
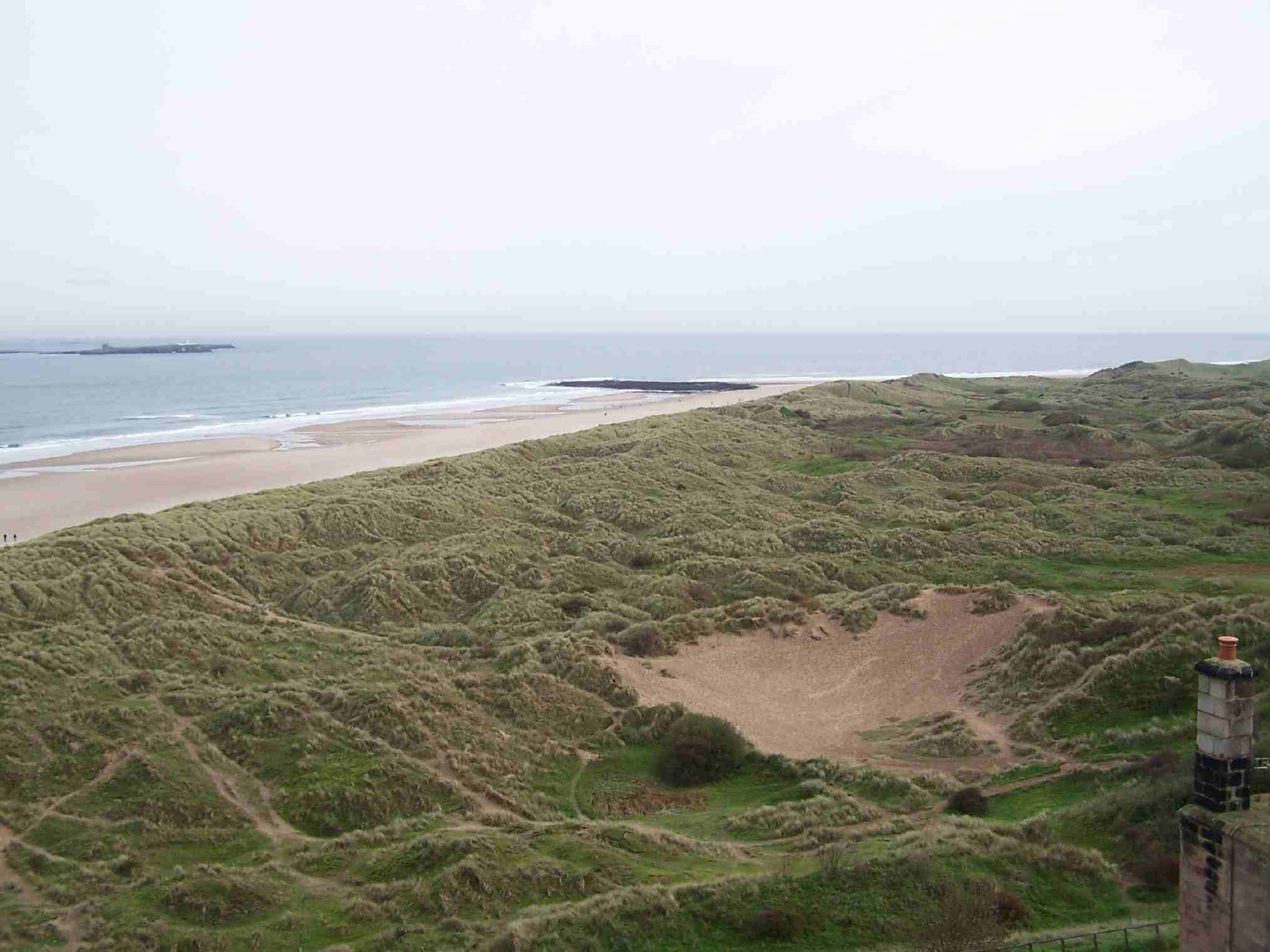
- The southern area of Bamburgh Dunes seen from Bamburgh Castle

- Location within Northumberland
- Location of Bamburgh Dunes.
- Area of search: Northumberland
- Grid reference: NU188350
- Coordinates: 55.608°N 1.703°W
- Area: 44.64 hectares (110 acres)
- Notification date: 28 February 1995

Bamburgh Dunes are a region of coastal sand dunes with an area of over 40 hectares situated around the village of Bamburgh in Northumberland, England. The dunes, which stand in the shadow of the impressive Bamburgh Castle, have been a Site of Special Scientific Interest (SSSI) since 1995 and are part of the North Northumberland Dunes Special Area of Conservation (SAC). The dunes have a rich diversity of flora and fauna and in places provide good examples of “climbing dunes” found where sand has been blown onto high ground adjacent to the beach.

Bamburgh Dunes vary from open sandy beaches, through low ridges dominated by marram grass, to more stable grass-covered dunes. These occur as a series of irregular parallel sand ridges and hummocks separated by hollows, which are seasonally wet. Some of the plant species include the pyramidal orchid, Centaurium, sea sandwort and petalwort (which is on the List of endangered species in the British Isles). The dunes are also rich in rare insect life. Over 500 species have been identified, with 15 rare species that include a plant hopper (Dicranotropis divergens), a grass-mining fly (Opomyza punctata), and a shore fly (Psilopa marginella). Birds attracted to the dunes include grasshopper warbler, sedge warbler, European stonechat, meadow pipit and reed bunting. In winter, short-eared owl and water rail are also found.

Over the years more vigorous invasive plant species and scrub have encroached, making the dune system too stabilised and threatening the uniqueness of Bamburgh Dunes, as most rare plant species appreciate the unstable and shifting structure of sand dunes. In an effort to counteract this, Bamburgh Castle Estate, English Nature, DEFRA, Northumberland County Council and Bamburgh Parish Council have come up with a plan of management which has resulted in cattle being allowed to graze the dunes since 2000 to break up the dominant grass cover. A fence has been erected to contain the cattle within the dunes. Access by people is encouraged within the fenced area with stiles and gates sited on the main paths.

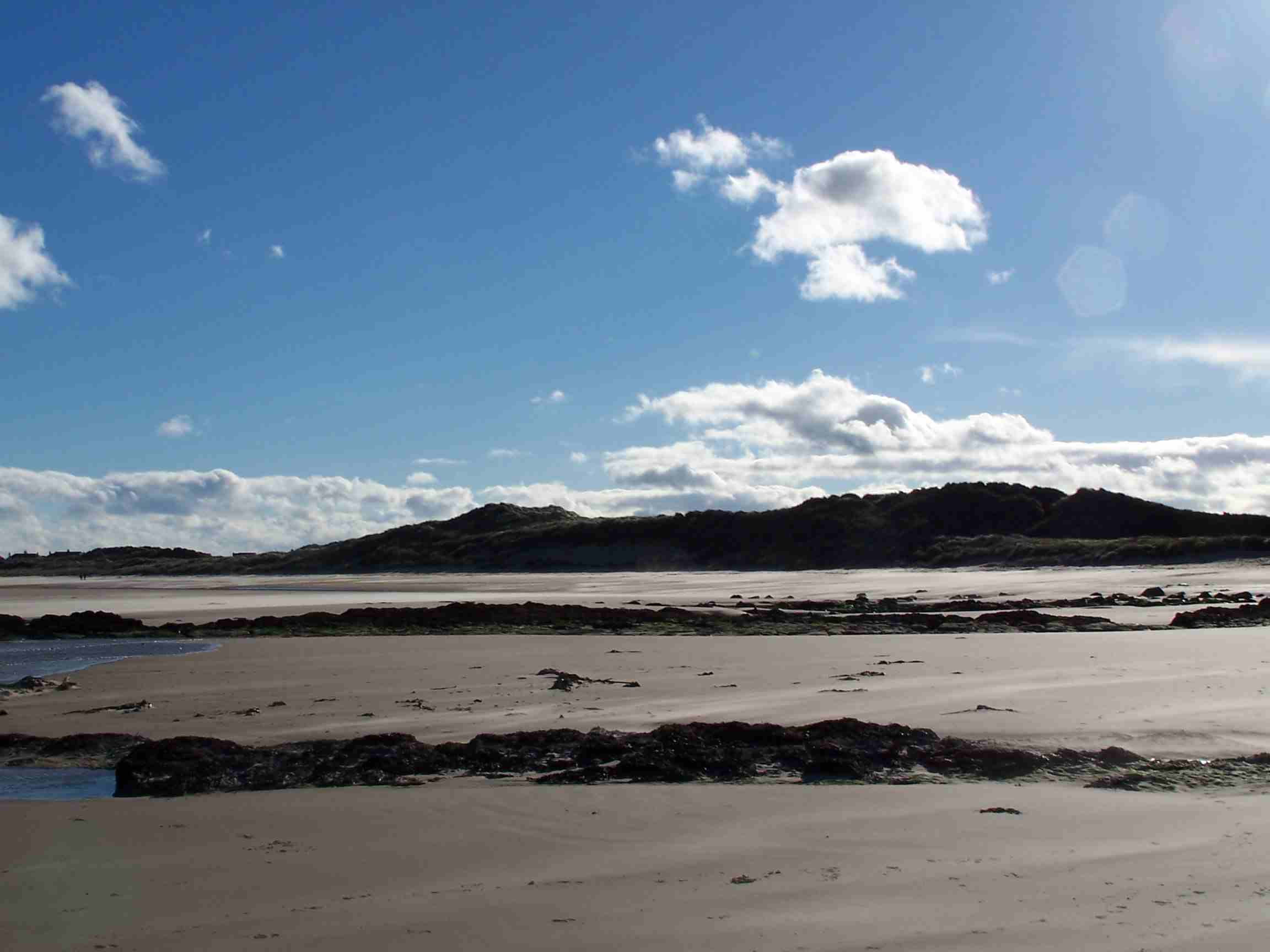
Bamburgh Dunes seen from the beach.

An ancient Anglo-Saxon 7th century burial ground was unearthed in the dunes to the southeast of Bamburgh Castle during an archaeological dig in 1998 by the Bamburgh Research Project. The burial ground, called the Bowl Hole, had been known to exist since 1816 when violent storms removed large amounts of dune sand and uncovered the site for a period. The BBC television programme “Meet the Ancestors” became involved during the dig and screened a programme about the finds in February 2001.
