= Supernatural Science =

- Genre: Documentary
- Narrated by: Jonathan Pryce
- Country of origin: United Kingdom
- Original language: English
- No. of seasons: 2
- No. of episodes: 17

Production
- Executive producer: Caroline van den Brul
- Producer: Robert Eagle
- Running time: 50 minutes

Original release
- Release: 8 February 1999 – 2000

Supernatural Science is a BBC Television documentary series that explores supernatural phenomena to determine whether or not there is a scientific explanation.

== Production ==
The series was co-produced with the Discovery Channel.

== Episodes ==
=== Season one (1999) ===
No.	Title	Topic	Directed by	Original release date
1	"Buried Alive"	Zombies	Karen Bishop	8 February 1999
Does a paralysing poison used to create zombies have a future use in space travel?
2	"Miracles of Faith – or Creations of Chemistry?"	Weeping Statues	Helen Thomas	16 February 1999
Are Madonnas that weep and statues that drink religious or the work of fraudsters?
3	"Monsters from the Lake"	Loch Ness Monster	Page Shepherd	17 February 1999
Is the Loch Ness Monster a Jurassic creature or a hoax?
4	"Spontaneous Human Combustion"	Spontaneous Human Combustion	Stephen Leslie	18 February 1999
Can forensic science find the cause of this bizarre occurrence?
5	"The Bermuda Triangle"	Bermuda Triangle	Jonathan Dent	9 February 1999
Does new evidence confirm the area as the most treacherous sea on Earth?
6	"Atlantis Found?"	Atlantis	Peter Getzels and Harriet Gordon	10 February 1999
Can scientists find this mystical city in a search from Europe to the high plains of South America?
7	"Between Life and Death"	Near Death Experience	Page Shepherd	11 February 1999
Can those who have narrowly escaped death help shed light on the workings of the human brain?
8	"ESP"	ESP	Peter Getzels and Harriet Gordon	12 February 1999
Is extra-sensory perception a collection of coincidences or is it a skill which could help solve crimes, or even fight wars?
9	"Physical Feats"	Hysterical Strength	John Groom	7 March 1999
Can the power of the human mind overcome the limits of the body?
10	"Open to Suggestion"	Hypnosis	Becky Jones	15 February 1999
Can scientists explain the mysterious world of hypnosis and its power for good and evil.
11	"Secrets of Levitation"	Levitation	Robert Eagle	21 February 1999
Can science show that levitation could have a future?
12	"Previous Lives"	Re-incarnation	Sacha Baveystock	28 February 1999
Can scientists reveal the truth behind the global belief in re-incarnation?
13	"Electric Hands and Mind Detectors"	Psychics	Stephen Leslie	19 February 1999
Can scientists explain those who use their hands and bodies as instruments for searching and healing.

=== Season two (2000) ===
No.	Title	Topic	Directed by	Original release date
14	"Extra-Terrestrial Life"	Extraterrestrial Life	Julia Dodd	TBA
Can scientists searching the distant universe for alternative intelligent life forms shed light on alien abductions?
15	"King Arthur"	King Arthur	Page Shepherd	TBA
Can scientists shed light on the truth behind one of Britain’s most engaging heroes?
16	"Monumental Mysteries"	Pyramids	TBA	TBA
Can scientists unravel the mysteries of monuments left by ancient kings of Israel and Egypt?
17	"Animal Telepathy"	Telepathy	TBA	TBA
Can scientists explain how the horse whisperer can communicate with animals?
