= Science Shack =

- Presented by: Adam Hart-Davis
- Country of origin: United Kingdom
- Original language: English

Science Shack is a BBC television series screened in 2001 and 2002. It was presented by Adam Hart-Davis and produced by Leeds UK-based Screenhouse Productions. The series set out to answer science questions by performing experiments. In the first series, topics included: 'Can you walk on the ceiling?' for which the team held an inverted walking competition, with Australians taking part; 'What will we do when the oil runs out?' with the shack in Cornwall and powered by alternative energy sources; and 'Why did the millennium bridge wobble?', in which the team built a working model of the footbridge near the Tate Modern.

The second series included a greater role for Hart-Davis's backup team of Marty Jopson, Jem Stansfield, Sim Oakley, Janet Sumner and Alom Shaha. Challenges this time included:

- Tall Buildings – in which the team try to make the world's biggest paper tower, complete with a lift, in the Millennium Dome
- Can I walk on water? – in which the team tries to build machines to allow people to walk on water, and for a few seconds hold the Guinness world record
- How high can I jump? – which sees Alom Shaha, athletes and others trying to jump over a model of the shack using only human powered devices
- Can you make someone invisible? – in which the team build a mirrored suit for hiding in a forest, and an 'invisible' (but noisy) car
- Can a human fly like a bird? – (i.e. powered by flapping wings rather than propeller), culminating in Hart-Davis being suspended from a one-man helium balloon and attempting to flap his wings
- Could you build an underwater house? – in which a submerged house was made from two skips welded together, with a CO_{2} scrubber and various other survival gadgets.

Producer and director of series one was Paul Bader, who was Executive Producer for series 2, which was directed by Patrick Titley. The series was supported with funding from the Open University, who also provided web support.

The "shack" in the programme's title was a flatpack shed, which was shown (via time-lapse photography) being assembled on location during the intro to each show.
