= Harold Mockford =

English painter (1932–2023)

Harold Sydney Mockford (1932 – 15 April 2023) was an English artist based in Sussex who was closely associated with the Towner Gallery in Eastbourne. Mockford was born in the town and developed an early talent for art in preference to other subjects at school. Later he attended evening classes at Eastbourne School of Art and continued with his painting while working as a dental technician.

== Biography ==
Mockford mainly worked in oils on board, and considered a painting complete when it has reached 'that perfect moment of strangeness', a state achieved by his distinctive technique. He began with flat plains of colour, leaving no area blank, then left the work face down on a blanket until he was ready to resume. He then incorporated the smudges, smears and textures to build up the scene which first inspired his imagination.

His subject was most often landscape, views of the South Downs and coast of the Eastbourne area or of the harbour at Newhaven where he lived from 1996. There were townscapes too, and intimate pictures of his studio and family, including a remarkable series recalling his father's illness and death. The added strangeness of fading light made evening a favourite time of day. Most of the paintings are in private hands but the Towner owns fourteen; others are in Brighton Museum and the Government Art Collection.

With encouragement from the abstract painter and Towner curator William Gear, Mockford's career flourished in 1959 when he had his first solo show in Eastbourne and exhibited with The London Group of which Gear was a member. A solo exhibition at the Thackeray Gallery in London followed, but Mockford was reluctant to commit himself to painting full-time and the self-promotion required to rely on art for a living.

Mockford illustrated a book of poetry by Pam Hughes and was chosen as a 'National Parks hero' for his paintings inspired by the South Downs. His 80th birthday in 2012 was celebrated by a major retrospective at the Towner Gallery. Nineteen of Mockford's works are included in the BBC's Your Paintings collection.

Mockford married Margaret in 1954, and they raised five children together. He died on 15 April 2023, at the age of 91.
