= Julian C. Richards =

British archaeologist and radio personality

Julian C. Richards FSA
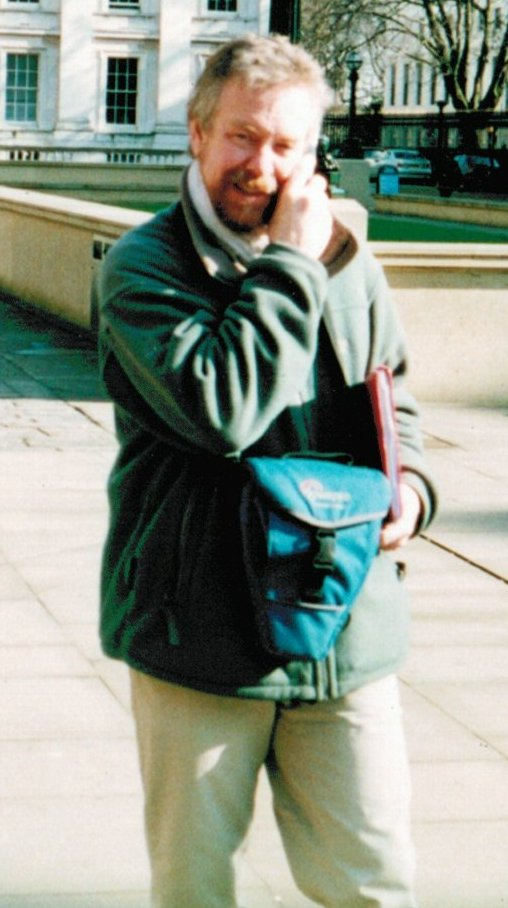
- Julian Richards in 2002
- Born: 1951 (age 74–75); Nottingham, Nottinghamshire, England
- Education: Reading University
- Occupations: British television and radio presenter
- Television: Meet the Ancestors, Blood of the Vikings

Julian C. Richards, FSA (born 1951) is a British television and radio presenter, writer and professional archaeologist with over 30 years' experience of fieldwork and publication.

== Early career ==
Richards was born in Nottingham, Nottinghamshire. He studied at Reading University. Between 1975 and 1980, he worked for the Berkshire Archaeological Unit, helping to build the county Sites and Monuments Record. He excavated and carried out a survey of the Berkshire Downs.

In 1980 he joined the new group Wessex Archaeology, based in Salisbury. For almost ten years he ran the Stonehenge Environs Project, a detailed study of Stonehenge and its surrounding landscape.

With Peter Cox and John Hawkes from Wessex Archaeology, Richards started AC Archaeology in 1991. AC Archaeology is still based in Wiltshire, and now also operates an office in Devon.

After three years Richards left commercial archaeology and joined English Heritage to work on its Monuments Protection Programme (MPP). As part of this work, he inspected sites and prepared reports on the protection of important archaeological sites in Wiltshire, Hampshire and the Isle of Wight.

== Media career ==
Shortly after joining the MPP, Richards acted as a consultant to a TV programme about the construction of Stonehenge. He later presented the programme Meet the Ancestors.

Meet the Ancestors was commissioned in late 1996. In the spring of 1997 Richards took a year's leave from English Heritage to work on it. He later resigned from his role with English Heritage to work full-time in broadcasting and writing when a second series was commissioned.

As of 2005 he has presented six series of Meet the Ancestors, a five-part series Blood of the Vikings in 2002, both for BBC 2. In addition, he has written books to accompany both series. For Radio 4 he has presented eleven series of Mapping the Town.

Richards is also responsible for creating two site-interactive games: Hunt the Ancestor (for which he won a British Archaeology award) and Viking Quest, for the BBC History website. He has also been a regular contributor to the BBC History website and magazine.

He also received a British Archaeological Award for the programme Chariot Queen.

In 2007 he published Stonehenge: The Story So Far. Other works include Stonehenge: A History in Photographs (2004) and the children's book The Amazing Pop-up Stonehenge (2005).

Richards lives with his family in Shaftesbury, Dorset, where he maintains his special interest in the prehistory of Wessex and particularly Stonehenge.

He is patron of the Friends of the Cromford Canal in Derbyshire.
