= Adam Hart-Davis =

British scientist, author (born 1943)

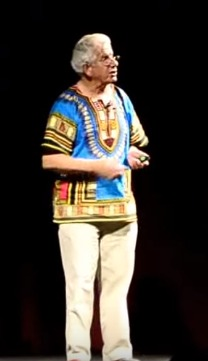
- Hart-Davis, speaking at the Ratio Forum for Popular Science in 2013
- Born: 4 July 1943 (age 83); Henley-on-Thames, Oxfordshire, England
- Education: Merton College, Oxford; University of York
- Spouses: Adrienne Alpin (m. 1965; div. 1995) Susan Blackmore (m. 2010)
- Children: 2
- Relatives: Rupert Hart-Davis (father); Duff Hart-Davis (brother); Deirdre Hart-Davis (aunt); Alice Hart-Davis (niece)
- Scientific career
- Fields: Chemistry
- Workplaces: Oxford University Press; University of Alberta

Adam John Hart-Davis (born 4 July 1943) is an English scientist, author, photographer, historian and broadcaster. He presented the BBC television series Local Heroes and What the Romans Did for Us, the latter spawning several spin-off series involving the Victorians, the Tudors, the Stuarts and the Ancients. He was also a co-presenter of Tomorrow's World, and presented Science Shack.

Hart-Davis was awarded an Honorary Fellowship of the Royal Photographic Society in 2007.

== Personal life ==
Hart-Davis was born and brought up in Henley-on-Thames, the youngest child of the publisher Sir Rupert Hart-Davis (1907–1999) and his second wife, Catherine Comfort Borden-Turner. He was educated at St Andrew's Preparatory School, near Pangbourne, and then at Eton College, before reading chemistry at Merton College, Oxford. He then took a PhD degree in organometallic chemistry at the University of York and spent three years as a post-doctoral scholar at the University of Alberta in Canada. Subsequently, he worked at the Oxford University Press, editing science texts and chess manuals. In 2004 he was awarded an honorary degree (Doctor of Letters) by the University of Bath.

== Career in broadcasting ==
Hart-Davis's work in broadcasting began in 1977 when he joined Yorkshire Television (YTV) as a researcher, working on material for Magnus Pyke, David Bellamy, Miriam Stoppard as well as Arthur C. Clarke's Mysterious World.

In 1985 he was promoted to production work, producing the Fred Harris-fronted TV show Me & My Micro and the Johnny Ball-fronted Fun & Games, amongst other things. He also devised and produced the school science show Scientific Eye.

In the early 1990s Hart-Davis moved in front of the camera to present two series for YTV: On The Edge and Local Heroes. The latter programme featured him cycling around the North of England in his trademark fluorescent pink and yellow cycling clothes, seeking out places associated with the great innovators of science and technology. The bicycles were his own, as he is a keen cyclist, owning an early Burrows Windcheetah as well as a mountain bike fitted with an early front monoblade. This series was transferred to BBC2, where its scope became national, a different region being the subject of each episode. Big Questions, a five-part Channel 4 science series for young people that he presented received a BAFTA nomination in 2002.

A new television series for the BBC called The Cosmos – A Beginner's Guide was broadcast on 7 August 2007 by BBC Two, and explored the latest ideas and experiments in cosmology. It was accompanied by a book of the same name.

He also appeared in TV advertisements for HM Revenue & Customs with the catchphrase "tax doesn't have to be taxing". Following a statement from Hart-Davis, in which he mentioned the level of complexities within the UK tax system, his contract with HM Revenue & Customs ended.

== Advocacy of the application and usefulness of science ==
Hart-Davis has a passion for raising awareness of simple benefits that science may bring to the quality of living, particularly in the developing world. One such innovation is the design of smoke-hoods from galvanised iron or mud to prevent the deadly effects of smoke inhalation from cooking fires inside houses in the developing world.

He is the Patron of the FatallyFlawed campaign against the use of plug-in socket covers.

He is also Patron of Erasmus Darwin House in Lichfield, the eighteenth-century home of Charles Darwin's grandfather, now a museum open to the public.

== Filmography ==
- Local Heroes (1996–99)
- What the Romans Did for Us (2000)
- Big Questions (2001)
- Live from Dinosaur Island (2001)
- What the Victorians Did for Us (2001)
- Science Shack (2001)
- What the Tudors Did for Us (2002)
- What the Stuarts Did for Us (2002)
- Tomorrow's World (2002)
- Meet the Ancestors: Our Top Ten Treasures (2003)
- Stardate: Close Encounters (2004)
- What the Ancients Did for Us (2005)
- How London Was Built (2005)
- Just Another Day (2007)
- How London Was Built (2008)
- Beeching's Tracks (2008)
- How Britain Was Built (2009)

== Published works ==
He has written many books, including a history of the toilet, entitled Thunder, Flush and Thomas Crapper, and Taking The Piss (A Potted History of Pee).
Published works include:

=== Author ===
- Scientific Eye, HarperCollins Publishers Ltd (November 1985), (ISBN 0-7135-2584-3)
- Mathematical Eye, Collins Educational (September 1989), (ISBN 0-04-448043-1)
- Scientific Eye: Exploring the Marvels of Science, Sterling Pub Co Inc (Mar 1990), (ISBN 0-8069-5758-1)
- Amazing Math Puzzles, Sterling Publishing; Reprint edition (May 1997), (ISBN 0-8069-9669-2)
- Thunder, Flush and Thomas Crapper: An Encycloopedia, Michael O'Mara Books; New Ed edition (10 October 1997), (ISBN 1-85479-250-4)
- Chain Reactions: Pioneers of British Science and Technology, National Portrait Gallery Publications (24 November 2000), (ISBN 1-85514-291-0)
- What the Victorians Did for Us, Headline Book Publishing (5 August 2002), (ISBN 0-7553-1137-X)
- The World's Stupidest Inventions, Michael O'Mara Books (18 August 2003), (ISBN 1-84317-036-1)
- What the Tudors and Stuarts Did for Us, Boxtree Ltd (5 September 2003), (ISBN 0-7522-1556-6)
- What the Past Did for Us, Publisher: BBC Books (14 October 2004), (ISBN 0-563-52207-0)
- Why Does A Ball Bounce?: And 100 Other Questions From the World of Science, Ebury Press (1 September 2005), (ISBN 0-09-190268-1)
- Just Another Day, Orion (21 September 2006), (ISBN 0-7528-7334-2)
- History: The Definitive Visual Guide – from the Dawn of Civilisation to the Present Day, Dorling Kindersley Publishers Ltd (4 October 2007), (ISBN 1-4053-1809-0)
- Eurekaaargh!! A spectacular collection of inventions that nearly worked. Past Times edition published 1999.
- The Book of Time, 2010.
- Very Heath Robinson, Sheldrake Press (2017), (ISBN 1-873329-48-2)

=== Collaborations ===
- Where There's Life, (with Hilary Lawson), Michael Joseph Ltd (10 May 1982), (ISBN 0-7181-2137-6)
- Test Your Psychic Powers, (with Susan Blackmore), Sterling Publishing; Reprint edition (May 1997), (ISBN 0-8069-9669-2)
- "Local Heroes" Book of British Ingenuity, (with Paul Bader), Sutton Publishing Ltd; (25 September 1997), (ISBN 0-7509-1473-4 )
- More "Local Heroes", (with Paul Bader), Sutton Publishing Ltd (20 August 1998), (ISBN 0-7509-1797-0)
- 100 Local Heroes, (with Paul Bader), Sutton Publishing Ltd; Rev Ed edition (22 July 1999), (ISBN 0-7509-2373-3)
- What the Romans Did for Us, (with Philip Wilkinson), Boxtree Ltd; New Ed edition (20 July 2001), (ISBN 0-7522-6172-X )
- The Book of Victorian Heroes, (with Paul Bader), Sutton Publishing Ltd (23 August 2001), (ISBN 0-7509-2820-4)
- Classic Mathemagic, (with Raymond Blum and Bob Longe), MetroBooks (NY) (August 2002), (ISBN 1-58663-683-9)
- Catchphrase, Slogan and Cliché, (with Judy Parkinson), Michael O'Mara Books (1 October 2003), (ISBN 1-84317-063-9)
- Henry Winstanley and the Eddystone Lighthouse, (with Emily Troscianko), Sutton Publishing Ltd; New Ed edition (23 October 2003), (ISBN 0-7509-3379-8)
- Taking the Piss: A Potted History of Pee, (with Emily Troscianko), The Chalford Press (10 October 2006), (ISBN 1-84588-351-9)
- The Cosmos: A Beginner's Guide, (with Paul Bader), BBC Books (21 June 2007), (ISBN 1-84607-212-3)
- Science : the definitive visual guide, Dorling Kindersley Limited (ISBN 978-0-241-24047-2)
