= Tomorrow's World Today =

- Genre: Instructional, Adventure
- Created by: George M. Davison, Julian V. Taylor
- Inspired by: Tomorrow's World
- Written by: Jude Michaels, George M. Davison, Elizabeth Urbanek (Seasons 4-9), Julian V. Taylor (seasons 3-6)
- Directed by: Julian V. Taylor (seasons 1-6), Zak Boyle (seasons 6-7), Jim Karousatos (seasons 7-10), Gina Pravlochak (Season 10)
- Creative director: Matt Polaski
- Presented by: Greg Costantino, Tamara Krinsky, Darieth Chisolm, David Carmine, Jackie Long
- Starring: George M. Davison
- Narrated by: Richard Sheffield
- Country of origin: United States
- No. of seasons: 10
- No. of episodes: 91 ([of episodes])

Production
- Executive producers: George M. Davison, Jude Michaels, Julian V. Taylor (seasons 1-6)
- Production locations: United States, Germany, Guatemala, United Arab Emirates, Canada, Costa Rica
- Editors: David Cohen, Doug Verosko
- Running time: 22 minutes
- Production companies: Flying Cork Media, George Davison Studios, TJL Productions (seasons 3-5)

Original release
- Network: Science Channel
- Release: May 5, 2018 – present

Related
- Tomorrow's World

Tomorrow's World Today is an innovation-based television series about companies from around the world on the cutting edge of tomorrow's technology. It is hosted by George Davison and features field reporters Tamara Krinsky, Darieth Chisolm, Greg Costantino, David Carmine, and Jackie Long. The show premiered on the Science Channel on Saturday, May 5, 2018 and airs on the Science Channel and Discovery. Tomorrow's World Today explores concepts in science and technology and is a combination of content shot in a studio and in the field. The series introduces innovative pioneers from around the world who are forming new ways to utilize natural and technological resources to create a more sustainable society. The Tomorrow's World Today® field reporters travel around the globe to learn more about technologies and innovations. The show was inspired by the long-running BBC program Tomorrow's World.

Tomorrow's World Today Episode Airdates
Season	Premiere date	Season finale date	Network
1	May 5, 2018	May 27, 2018	Science Channel
2	May 4, 2019	May 26, 2019	Science Channel
3	October 3, 2020	December 19, 2020	Science Channel, Discovery
4	August 14, 2021	January 29, 2022	Science Channel, Discovery
5	September 10, 2022	December 17, 2022	Science Channel, Discovery
6	September 9, 2023	October 28, 2023	Science Channel
6 (Reair)	October 29, 2023	December 17, 2023	Discovery
7	April 20, 2024	June 1, 2024	Science Channel
8	September 21, 2024	December 14, 2024	Science Channel
9	June 7, 2025	November 8, 2025	Science Channel
9 (Reair)	August 24, 2025	November 9, 2025	Discovery
10	April 18, 2026	TBD	Science Channel, Discovery

== Awards ==
Tomorrow's World Today was nominated for a Daytime Emmy for Outstanding Art Direction/Set Decoration/Scenic Design in 2019.

Tomorrow's World Today won four Telly Awards in 2025. The series earned Silver Awards for Non-Scripted Series, Sustainability Series, and Education & Discovery Series, as well as a Bronze Award for Science & Technology Series.

=== Silver Winners ===
WINNER	Category
Tomorrow's World Today	Sustainability
Tomorrow's World Today	Non-Scripted
Tomorrow's World Today	Education & Discovery

=== Bronze Winners ===
WINNER	Category
Tomorrow's World Today	Science & Technology

Tomorrow's World Today won three Telly Awards in 2026. The series earned a Silver Award for Non-Scripted Series, as well as Bronze Awards for Science & Technology Series and Sustainability Series.

TWT Report won two Telly Awards in 2026. The series earned Silver Awards for News & News Feature and Documentary: Short Form (under 40 mins.)

=== Silver Winners ===
WINNER	Category
Tomorrow's World Today	TWT Report-News & News Feature
Tomorrow's World Today	Non-Scripted
Tomorrow's World Today	TWT Report-Documentary: Short Form (Under 40 Mins.)

=== Bronze Winners ===
WINNER	Category
Tomorrow's World Today	Science & Technology
Tomorrow's World Today	Sustainability

== Airings ==
After an episode's World Premiere on Science Channel and Discovery, it can be streamed on TomorrowsWorldToday.com

== Show Synopsis ==
Tomorrow’s World Today explores the relationship between the natural world and human innovation. The programme examines developments in science, technology, and sustainability, focusing on the people and ideas behind them and their potential applications.

We organize our exploration of the future into four distinct pillars:

1. The World of Inspiration: In the World of Inspiration, Tomorrow's World Today explores the mysteries of nature. Nature inspires us, and without people who are inspired, the other three worlds cannot exist. When we are inspired, we create.

2. The World of Creation: This world does all sorts of traditional artistic work: glass blowing, blacksmithing, gardening, painting, and much more. The traditional arts of the past - which are the hobbies and crafts of today - were once innovations (like inventing blue glass for drinking glasses or white porcelain for plates). These traditional crafts not only demonstrate creativity, but they also teach the basics of how to make things.

3. The World of Innovation: In this world, we draw upon knowledge from the World of Creation in raw material science, manufacturing know-how, and more to inspire us to push into the next frontier of innovation, so we can attempt to discover and make new things for the benefit of humankind.

4. The World of Production: Once we innovate new things, To scale up, we need to develop methodologies and equipment that build the World of Production (think car factories, candy factories, breweries, and more).

It is in these 4 worlds that the stories of Tomorrow's World Today are told.

The first season of the TV series focused on George Davison's creative vision of building a sustainable "Park of the Future."
