= What the Romans Did for Us =

- Genre: Documentary
- Directed by: Inge Samuels
- Presented by: Adam Hart-Davis
- Composer: Deborah Mollison
- Country of origin: United Kingdom
- Original language: English
- No. of episodes: 6

Production
- Producers: Caroline van den Brul; Martin Mortimore; Simon Baker; Catrine Clay
- Editor: Peter Parnham
- Running time: 23 minutes

Original release
- Network: BBC Two
- Release: 6 November – 11 December 2000

What the Romans Did for Us is a 2000 BBC documentary series "looking at the innovations and inventions brought to Britain by the Romans". The title of the programme is derived from the film Monty Python's Life of Brian, referencing the scene where the People's Front of Judea discuss "What have the Romans done for us?"

== Production ==
In 2003, the series was re-edited into ten-minute sections for broadcast as programme fillers.

=== Awards ===
It was nominated for Best Feature at the British Academy Television Awards 2001.

== Episodes ==
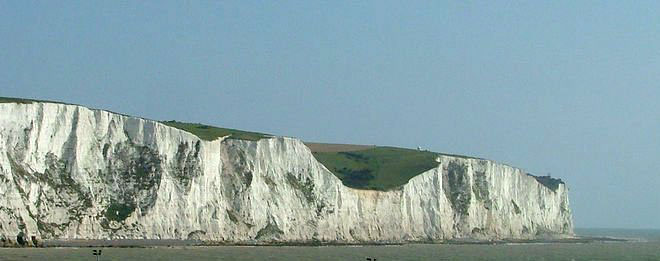
The White Cliffs of Dover

These are the White Cliffs of Dover, and this must have been the first bit of Britain that the Romans saw when they came to invade. In fact they came in force in about May of AD 43. That wasn’t the first time they had visited the islands because Julius Caesar had come over a hundred years earlier, but he only stayed for a few weeks. In AD 43 the Romans meant to stay.

— Adam Hart-Davis

=== Episode one: Life of Luxury ===
After hundreds of years of occupation many generations of people in Britain had grown up surrounded by Roman culture, and after a long period of stability that culture was showing visible signs of wealth, success and good living.

— Adam Hart-Davis

- Roman villas, such as Littlecote Roman Villa visited by Hart-Davis, had elaborate mosaics and ornate gardens.
- The screw press, reconstructed using traditional techniques by carpenter Henry Russell, was used to produce wine.
- Aqueducts, such as the one near Dorchester visited by Hart-Davis, exemplified the Roman's mastery of hydraulic engineering.
- Hypocausts, like the replica visited by Hart Davis, was the heart of Thermae, such as those in Bath, Somerset visited by Hart-Davis.
- Cooking implements, demonstrated by food historian and chef Sally Grainger, were used to create 3-course Roman meals.

=== Episode two: Invasion ===
In this series I’m going to see what the Romans brought with them and what they left behind when finally they went home 400 years later. Why did they come? Well, partly for the glory, partly for the farmland, and for the minerals like copper, lead and gold, and simply to trade. We'll be returning to those things later in the series, but for the moment lets see how they established their first foothold.

— Adam Hart-Davis

- Galleys with banks of rowers, simple sails and twin steering oars brought over 40,000 troops that landed at Richborough.
- Legionaries and cavalrymen with superior armour, battle formations, field weapons, and even elephants swept to victory.
- Prefabricated forts, such as the reconstruction at Lunt visited by Hart-Davis, secured the victory and exemplified their engineering skills.
- Roman artillery such as the Onager and the Ballista secured victory at Maiden Castle and Hodd Hill visited by Hart-Davis.
- Pharos, such as the one visited by Hart-Davis, guided Roman supply vessels into the great port at Dover.

=== Episode three: Building Britain ===
Within 30 years of the invasion there were 60,000 Roman troops in Britain, they had come from some of the most advanced places in Europe, and to them this sort of settlement must have seemed primitive. This is the story of how they transformed the landscape and laid the foundations for the countryside and the cities that we have today.

— Adam Hart-Davis

- Intensive farming methods introduced by the Romans included the introduction of new crops, the draining of marshes, and iron ploughs.
- Trade and commerce settlements alongside the military camps grew into grid-patterned walled towns such as York visited by Hart-Davis.
- Sewers, high-rise apartments, street lighting and glass windows were all features of Roman towns and cities.
- Cafes and snack bars provided the Romans with fast food takeaways including pies, pastries, sausages and even hamburgers.
- Fire brigades and primitive fire extinguishers, demonstrated by Hart-Davis, were developed under the auspices of the Emperor Nero.

=== Episode four: Arteries of the Empire ===
When Britain became Roman the Britons gained access to the finest goods the Empire could offer. The Roman economy was fuelled by trade, but they had trouble meeting the demand for luxury goods like jewellery. What they needed was the raw materials, the ores, and that is one of the principal reasons that the Romans came to Britain and stayed here for 400 years, but this trade would have been impossible without their amazing network of roads.

— Adam Hart-Davis

- Groma surveying, demonstrated by Hart-Davis, allowed the surveying of perfectly straight roads such as Watling Street and Stane Street.
- The construction of Roman roads, demonstrated by Hart Davis, has allowed them to endure to this day.
- Vitruvius's odometer, demonstrated by Hart-Davis, were used for the accurate measurement and placing of milestones.
- Roman merchants introduced mass-produced pottery, glassware, amber jewellery, metal ware and amphora of wine and olive oil.
- Gold was mined with revolutionary engineering, in places like Dolaucothi Gold Mines visited by Hart-Davis, for use in trade.

=== Episode five: Edge of Empire ===
The Roman Army took nearly 50 years to work their way up, through their new province, to what is now Scotland. But they never really conquered these northern tribes, and they remained a thorn in the flesh of Roman Britain. By about AD 120, the northern frontier ranged from Wallsend in the east, to Carlisle in the west, and the emperor Hadrian said, "Build a wall, and keep all the others out." This remains the best known frontier anywhere in the Roman world, and it's the perfect place from which to contemplate life at the edge of empire.

— Adam Hart-Davis

- Hadrian's Wall marked the northern boundary of the Roman Empire, and had defensive features such as milecastles and forts such as Housesteads.
- At supply depots such as Arbeia, Romans baked bread in open fires.
- Roman soldiers used rounded stones as defensive weapons, and blacksmiths made arrowheads and other items out of iron.
- Many documents have been discovered at Vindolanda fort, such as postcards made out of thin wood veneer.
- Wax tablets were used for making temporary notes.
- Flagged beacons were used to send messages between forts, milecastles, and watchtowers.
- Pre-determined messages were also sent using identical water-clocks, and signalling using fire.

=== Episode six: Ahead of Their Time ===
The Romans ruled Britain for nearly four hundred years. They brought with them all sorts of revolutionary new concepts, from the hot bath to the hamburger. In this programme, I'm going to look at some of their wackier technology, like the first robot, and the slot machine; inventions that were literally centuries ahead of their time.

— Adam Hart-Davis

- The occupying Romans kept their people occupied with food and entertainment, or "bread and circuses".
- Gladiators performing in amphitheatres would use a coin-operated water dispenser for cleansing as part of their pre-fight rituals.
- Romans built automata driven by a weight sitting on a container of sand that was slowly allowed to empty.
- Builders made mortar out of chalk and sand, and added volcanic ash to make quick-setting concrete. This was used to make arched and domed structures.
- An anonymous work, De Rebus Bellicis, featured various war machines, such as an inflatable bridge made out of animal skins.
- Eventually, the Roman empire became too large and indefensible, and the troops were gradually withdrawn from Britain. Some technologies were then lost, and others remain.
