= Liz Tucker =

British documentary producer and director

Liz Tucker is a British documentary producer and director. She joined the BBC in the early nineties, working initially as a radio producer before moving into television. She started her career on screen working on the show Tomorrow's World, where she told the story of Trevor Baylis, inventor of the Clockwork Radio. Following the publicity surrounding the film, Trevor shortly afterwards signed a deal resulting in the worldwide launch of his radio. While at the BBC, Tucker also worked on a range of documentary programmes/series including QED, Horizon and Life Before Birth. After leaving the BBC and working as a freelance director, she launched her own production company, Verve Productions, in 2007.

== Awards ==
Verve Productions' TV documentary Filming My Father: In Life and Death has won six awards and nominations, including a gold medal at the New York Film Festival World's Best TV and Films; Winner of the Broadcaster of the Year awards at the MJA Awards; Highly Commended at the AIB Awards; shortlisted at the Monte Carlo TV Festival; shortlisted at the Broadcast Awards and at the Televisual BullDog Awards.

This documentary followed one family in crisis over four years as they struggled to come to terms with the father Steve Isaac's terminal illness - motor neurone disease (known as ALS in North America).

Tucker's other films include programmes made for the BBC, Channel 5, Channel 4, WGBH, Discovery and TLC, which have been broadcast in over 100 countries.

Some of Tucker's best known films include: Archimedes’ Secret, which won the Glaxo/ABSW Science Writer's Award for best science documentary; God on the Brain shortlisted again for the Glaxo Wellcome ABSW Science Writers' Awards; Sudden Death, which won the RTS award for best documentary series; Blood of the Vikings series in which she made two of the programmes was nominated for a RTS award, her first film in the series won the Palmares Award 2004. It also won a Certificate of Merit at the San Francisco Film Festival.
