= Local Heroes (company) =

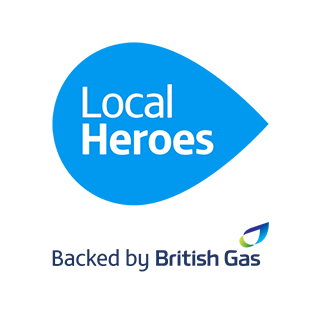
- Trade name: Local Heroes
- Company type: Limited company (subsidiary of Centrica)
- Traded as: LSE: CNA; FTSE 100 Component
- Founded: 2016
- Headquarters: London, W1K; United Kingdom
- Area served: Great Britain
- Key people: Dale Williams
- Services: Plumbing, electrical, drainage, heating, locksmith, tiling, plastering, painting and decorating, handyman
- Number of employees: 25 employees (2022); Over 7,000 independent tradespeople
- Parent: Centrica
- Website: localheroes.com

Local Heroes was a British online service that connected people with local plumbers, electricians, and other tradespeople. It was launched in early 2016 by Centrica through its subsidiary British Gas.

The service operated across Great Britain and Ireland, working with a network of vetted independent tradespeople to fulfill customer jobs, before closing down in late 2023.

== History ==
Launched in February 2016, Local Heroes provided limited availability to the Croydon area, expanding to the West Midlands in October 2016 and Glasgow in April 2017. UK-wide coverage was completed in June 2017.

Local Heroes was nominated for the Best New Proposition Award at the CEA 2017 and won the Customer Engagement Award at the Peer Awards 2018.

Local Heroes launched its app for traders, Toolbox, in August 2018.

In September 2023, British Gas announced that the Local Heroes platform would be closing in October 2023 to focus on the "growing demand for British Gas services".

On 20 October 2023, Local Heroes ceased trading.

== Operations ==
The Local Heroes website required registered tradespeople to accept jobs on their site via email, smartphone, or desktop computer.

=== Pricing and payments ===
When a user completed the form requesting a tradesperson, Local Heroes used market research and historical data to provide an estimated price range for the requested job. If accepted, the Local Hero would then provide a final quote directly to the user, from which they could choose whether to accept or not.

As all jobs were guaranteed by British Gas, the user must pay directly to Local Heroes and will void the guarantee if cash is paid. Once a job is complete, the tradesperson creates a bill for the customer, who then pays via PayPal or credit card.

=== Requirements for Heroes ===
In order for a tradesperson to become a Local Hero, they must have had £2 million Public Liability Insurance and provide banking details and a company logo or profile picture.

In addition, certain trades required specific qualifications, such as registration with a government-approved Competent Persons scheme, e.g. NICEIC.

== Trades ==
Local Heroes operated in a range of trades. Before ceasing operations, the following trades were offered:

- Plumbers
- Heating Engineers
- Drainage Engineers
- Electricians
- Handy People
- Painters and Decorators
- Plasterers
- Tilers
- Locksmiths
- Appliance Engineers
