= What the Victorians Did for Us =

- Genre: Documentary
- Presented by: Adam Hart-Davis
- Country of origin: United Kingdom
- Original language: English
- No. of episodes: 8

Production
- Producers: Caroline van den Brul; Cameron Balbirnie; Prim Bath; Annabel Gillings
- Editors: Ben Giles; David Murray
- Running time: 23 minutes

Original release
- Network: BBC Two
- Release: 3 September – 22 October 2001

What the Victorians Did for Us is a 2001 BBC documentary series that examines the impact of the Victorian era on modern society. It concentrates primarily on the scientific and social advances of the era, which bore the Industrial Revolution and set the standards for polite society today.

== Episodes ==
=== Speed Merchants ===
Video on YouTube

=== Rule Makers ===
Video on YouTube

In 1875, the Bulldog Club defined the perfect British Bulldog, in a booklet that was circulated to breeders everywhere. From dogs to engineering, from sports to space and time, the world was becoming obsessed by standards, and the rules that defined them. This was the world of the Victorians.

— Adam Hart-Davis

- Victorians standardised the rules for association football, or soccer, based on a range of games already played, such as the Eton wall game.
- Walter Clopton Wingfield invented the game of lawn tennis, which allowed young men and women to socialise together, and to get more exercise than by playing the sedate game of croquet.
- Victorians set down rules for formal dining, and invented the fish knife. Mrs Beeton documented recipes and how to run a household.
- Florence Nightingale recorded extensive details of wounded soldiers in the Crimean War, and used these statistics to demonstrate to a Royal Commission the effectiveness of simple hygiene in reducing unnecessary deaths.
- In 1869, Dmitri Mendeleev formulated the periodic table of the chemical elements, including gaps where as-yet undiscovered elements would fit.
- Joseph Whitworth devised a series of standards for engineering, and built a rifle with an accurately-rifled barrel.
- Greenwich Observatory was used to define the official time for the whole country, and the zero line of longitude.

=== Crime and Punishment ===
Video on YouTube

=== Social Progress ===
Video on YouTube

=== Pleasure Seekers ===
Video on YouTube

=== Making It Big ===
Video on YouTube

=== Conquerors ===
Video on YouTube
