= Tomorrow's World =

British TV science and technology series (1965–2003)

- Genre: Factual, Science & Technology
- Created by: Glyn Jones
- Directed by: Stuart McDonald
- Presented by: Numerous (see Presenters)
- Theme music composer: John Dankworth (1965–1979 theme)
- Country of origin: United Kingdom
- Original language: English
- No. of episodes: 1,400

Production
- Executive producers: Max Morgan-Witts; Michael Latham; Michael Blakstad; Richard Reisz; Dana Purvis; Saul Nasse
- Producers: Roy Battersby; John Mansfield; Richard Loncraine; Liz Tucker; Sam Roberts; Michael Cumming; Richard Dale; Judith Bunting; Martin Mortimore; Sam Starbuck; David McNab; Richard Collin

Original release
- Network: BBC1
- Release: 7 July 1965 – 16 July 2003

Related
- The Tomorrow's World Roadshow

Tomorrow's World is a British television series about contemporary developments in science and technology. First broadcast on 7 July 1965 on BBC1, it ran for 38 years until it was cancelled at the beginning of 2003. The Tomorrow's World title was revived in 2017 as an umbrella brand for BBC science programming.

== Content ==
Tomorrow's World was created by Glyn Jones to fill a half-hour slot in the BBC summer schedule of 1965. Jones and his wife conceived the show's name the night before the Radio Times went to press. At the beginning of the programme's tenure, the show was edited by Max Morgan-Witts and hosted by veteran broadcaster and former Spitfire pilot Raymond Baxter. For many years, it had an instrumental theme tune composed and performed by John Dankworth. During the 1970s, the programme attracted an audience of 10,000,000 viewers per week.

The programme was usually broadcast live, and as a result saw the occasional failure of its technology demonstrations. For example, during a demonstration of a new kind of car jack that required much less effort to operate, the jack disintegrated. Pressing on in the face of such adversity became a rite of passage, both for new presenters on the show and for the young assistant producers whose job it was to find the stories and make sure this kind of setback did not happen.

Sometimes, however, the live nature gave an added dimension of immediacy to the technology, such as inventors personally demonstrating flame-proof clothing and bullet-proof vests while the presenters looked on. Sometimes it was the presenter who acted as a test dummy.

Tomorrow's World also frequently ran exhibitions, called Tomorrow's World Live, often based in Earls Court, London. These offered the general public the chance to see at first-hand a variety of brand new, pioneering inventions, as well as a selection from that year's show. The presenters, by this time Peter Snow and Philippa Forrester, also ran an hour-long interactive presentation within.

The show was also occasionally parodied, for example by Not the Nine O'Clock News, which featured demonstrations of such inventions as a telephone ring notification device for the deaf – powered by a microprocessor looking like a "Shreddie", and later by the second series of Look Around You.

== Presenters ==
Raymond Baxter, the show's first presenter, was noted for pointing out features of the new inventions with military precision using his Parker pen ("as you will see: here, here and here"). He left the show in 1977 after a difference of opinion with new young editor Michael Blakstad, who allegedly referred to him in a press interview as "the last of the dinosaurs".

Other presenters included:

- James Burke (1965–1971)
- Michael Rodd (1972–1982)
- Anthony Smith
- Lyall Watson
- William Woollard (1974–1978)
- Judith Hann (1974–1994—the longest-serving presenter)
- Anna Ford (1976–1978)
- Kieran Prendiville (1979–1983)
- Su Ingle (1980–1984)
- Peter Macann (1983–1991)
- Maggie Philbin (1983–1994)
- Anna Walker
- Howard Stableford (1985–1997)
- Kate Bellingham (1990–1994)
- John Diamond (1991)
- Carmen Pryce (1991–1994)
- Monty Don (1994–1995)
- Carol Vorderman (1994–1995)
- Vivienne Parry (1994–1996)
- Rebecca Stephens (1994–1996)
- Shahnaz Pakravan (1994–1997)
- Richard Mabey (1995)
- Craig Doyle (1996–1999)
- Philippa Forrester (1996–2000)
- Jez Nelson (1996–2000)
- Peter Snow (1997–2000)
- Anya Sitaram (1998–2000)
- Nick Baker (1999–2000)
- Lindsey Fallow (1999–2000)
- Sophie Raworth (1999–2000)
- Katie Knapman (2002)
- David Bull (2002–2003)
- Adam Hart-Davis (2002–2003)
- Roger Black (2003)
- Kate Humble (2003)

The idiosyncratic Bob Symes showcased smaller inventions in dramatised vignettes with themes such as Bob Goes Golfing. These often presented challenges for film directors with whom he worked when a close-up was required as Symes's own invention-related exploits in the workshop had resulted in him losing parts of several fingers. It was hard to find a finger that did not look too gruesome to show on screen. Other regular features included Whatever Happened to ..., picking up on the oft-levelled criticism of the show that a significant number of inventions seemingly were never heard of again.

== Technologies introduced ==
In many cases the show offered the British public its first chance to see key technologies that subsequently became commonplace, notably:

- Breathalyser (1967)
- Home computer (1967)
- Light pens and touchscreens (1967)
- Artificial grass (1968)
- Synthesizer (1969)
- ATM and chip and pin (1969)
- Pocket calculator (1971)
- Digital watch (1972)
- Teletext (Ceefax) (1974)
- Mobile phone (1979)
- Personal stereo (1980)
- Compact disc and player (1981)
- Camcorder (1981)
- Barcode reader (1983)
- Wind-up radio (1993)
- Starlite insulation (1993)
- Robotic vacuum cleaner, pioneered on Electrolux Trilobite prototype (1996)
- Targeted intra-operative radiotherapy for breast cancer (2000)

Perhaps the best-remembered item in the programme's history was the introduction of the compact disc in 1981, when presenter Kieran Prendiville demonstrated the disc's supposed indestructibility by scratching the surface of a Bee Gees CD with a stone. The show also gave the first British TV exposure to the group Kraftwerk, who performed their then-forthcoming single "Autobahn" as part of an item about the use of technology in musicmaking. Another programme concerning new technology for television and stage lighting featured The Tremeloes and the Syd Barrett-led Pink Floyd.

=== Offbeat aspects ===
Featured inventions that did not change lives included a fold-up car that fitted into a suitcase, numerous gadgets such as a miracle chopping board for the kitchen, and collapsible knives and forks. Members of the public frequently sent in their ideas.

== Incidents ==
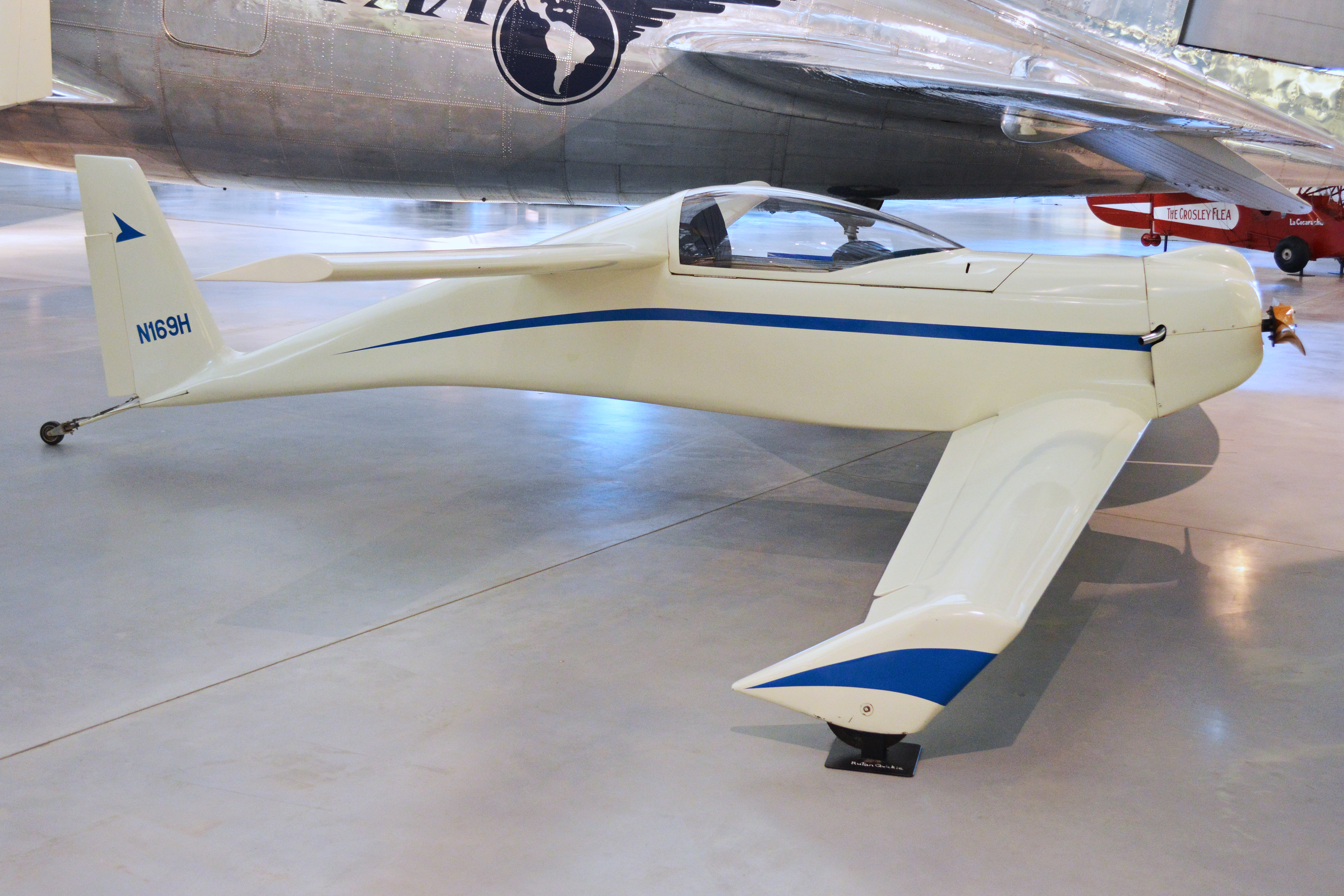
Rutan Quickie in May 2015

On 22 April 1981, 29-year-old BBC graphic designer Doug Burd, of College Road in Isleworth, was piloting a bizarre kit-built aircraft called Rutan Quickie G-BHUK, housed at Cranfield University. It collided with a Cessna 152, piloted by Stephen Fernley from Denham Air School, over Bedfordshire. The 'Quickie' landed on an institution for the mentally handicapped, killing the pilot.

Burd had studied graphic design (illustration) at the Twickenham College of Technology in the early 1970s, under Bob Cosford, the designer of the title sequence of Grange Hill and Juliet Bravo. Burd was the graphic designer for series 3 and 4 of Blake's 7, and the title sequence to The Hitchhiker's Guide to the Galaxy (1981) and The Day of the Triffids (1981). In 1980, he was nominated for the British Academy Television Craft Award for Best Titles & Graphic Identity for the title sequence of Tinker Tailor Soldier Spy (1979).

== Final years ==
By the late 1990s, the live studio demonstrations had been dropped in favour of purely pre-recorded items. The final series, presented by Adam Hart-Davis, Kate Humble and Roger Black, attempted to revert to the original live format of the show, even using a remix of one of the theme tunes used during its more successful years. However, ratings continued to fall and, with only three million viewers, the BBC decided to axe the show. At the time, it said that it would produce a number of science special editions under the Tomorrow's World brand from time to time. The "Tomorrow's World Roadshow" appeared in 2004, with Gareth Jones (co-host of CITV's How 2) and Katie Knapman taking the helm as the last presenters of a show bearing the Tomorrow's World name, before a partial return to television in 2007.

For the 1000th episode, a commemorative CD was produced by Nimbus Records. It contained audio tracks of the four theme tunes that were used from 1965 to the early 1990s. One thousand copies were made and given away in a competition. The CD was notable as being the first holographic audio compact disc ever made.

On 14 September 2009, the BBC made some clips and episodes available online.

In the United States, episodes of the series aired on the cable channel TechTV between 2001 and 2003.

=== The Prince of Wales Award for Industrial Innovation and Production ===
At the end of each series, the Prince of Wales gave an award or awards for superlative inventions.

=== Revival of the brand ===
At the start of 2007, the BBC announced that the Tomorrow's World brand would be used on science and technology news reports across the BBC's TV, radio and internet services, including a blog. The Tomorrow's World name returned to television screens on 8 January 2007 as part of the BBC's news coverage on BBC Breakfast, hosted by Maggie Philbin, and as a blog on the BBC News website. In August 2007, it was reported that Michael Mosley, director of development at the BBC's science wing, had pitched the concept of resurrecting the format to BBC commissioners.

In May 2017, the BBC announced it was launching a year of science and technology under the Tomorrow's World banner. Its purpose is to "seek to address how science is changing people's lives, reshaping the world, and rewriting the future of healthcare".

=== BBC Four live edition ===
Tomorrow's World returned for a one-off live special, with Hannah Fry and four presenters from the show's original run: Maggie Philbin, Howard Stableford, Judith Hann and Peter Snow. The 90-minute interactive show was broadcast at 9 pm on BBC Four on 22 November 2018.

== Science Channel reboot ==
In May 2018, Science Channel premiered a new version of the show called Tomorrow's World Today. The show explores sustainability, technology, new ideas and worldwide concepts around innovation. Julian Taylor serves as executive producer and the programme features executive producer George Davison as host and field reporters Tamara Krinsky and Jackie Long.

== See also ==
- Beyond Tomorrow
- Click
- Daily Planet
- Look Around You series 2 satirised Tomorrow's World
