= Local Heroes (British TV series) =

- Directed by: Paul Bader
- Presented by: Adam Hart-Davis
- Country of origin: United Kingdom
- Original language: English
- No. of series: 4

Production
- Production company: Screenhouse Productions

Original release
- Network: ITV
- Release: 1992 – 2000

Local Heroes is a science and history television programme in the United Kingdom, presented by Adam Hart-Davis.

Made by Screenhouse Productions and directed by Paul Bader, it was first aired on the ITV regional network Yorkshire Television in 1992. In the show, Adam Hart-Davis, dressed in the pink and yellow cycling clothes that would become the show's trademark, rode around the YTV region (including Yorkshire, Norfolk and Lincolnshire) on a matching pink and yellow bicycle, stopping in a particular area to tell the stories of scientists that lived or were born there. These stories were embellished by experiments, performed on the street by Hart-Davis, generally using bits of wood and junk from a trailer on his bike.

This hobo-meets-Johnny Ball style approach to science-education proved appealing, and after two series, the show was sold to the national BBC2 network in 1994. The move saw two changes: the scope of the show was expanded nationwide, with a different region visited each episode; and the theme tune was changed from No More Heroes by The Stranglers to a twee and plinky number, more in keeping with the programme genre. Eventually this was replaced by a more upbeat theme, by Wallace and Gromit composer Julian Nott, played by a Czech orchestra.

Since then, the series has covered over 200 'heroes', and has seen several special episodes. The first special saw Hart-Davis visit Egypt to investigate ancient heroes, while another took him to Italy for a Renaissance special. Another notable show was the finale of the last series (to date), which was performed in front of a live audience at the Royal Institution, much in the style of the Institution's Christmas Lectures.

The show continued until 2000. Since then, Hart-Davis has moved on to other shows, and the bbc.co.uk Local Heroes pages have now been deleted, suggesting that no further series are planned.

== Series 1 ==
1. South West:
  - Sarah Guppy: patented the exercise bed, the breakfast urn and the suspension bridge
  - William Watts: invented lead shot
  - Humphry Davy: discovered laughing gas, started electrochemistry and made patients breathe gases from cows
  - Edward Jenner: introduced vaccination against smallpox
  - Mikael Pedersen: designed a beautiful and curious bicycle
  - George Pocock (inventor): inventor of spanking machine and pioneer of kite locomotion
2. South:
  - John Milne: founder of modern seismology
  - Edward Lyon Berthon, who invented the folding lifeboat
  - Florence Nightingale
  - Colin Pullinger
  - John Stringfellow:
3. Scotland:
  - Charles Piazzi Smyth
  - Joseph Black
  - John Napier
  - David Brewster
  - David Douglas
  - Gilbert D. Malloch (1881–1955)
  - Nevil Maskelyne
  - Charles Hutton
4. Midlands:
  - John Barber (engineer): patented the gas turbine
  - Matthew Boulton: host of the Lunar Society, a gathering of scientists
  - William Withering: made heart cure from foxgloves (digitalis)
  - William Murdoch: invented gas lighting
  - James Watt: invented the copying machine and greatly improved steam engines
  - Dennis Gabor: invented the hologram on a tennis court – before it was possible to make one
  - Alexander Parkes: produced plastics, two generations ahead of their time
  - Frederick W. Lanchester: built the first all-British four-wheel petrol-driven car
5. Northern Ireland:
  - John Boyd Dunlop: invented the pneumatic tyre
  - William Coppin: invented the diving suit and pioneered salvage operations
  - George Garrett (inventor): invented a submarine, powered by steam and called Resurgam
  - John Getty McGee: invented the Ulster overcoat (as worn by Sherlock Holmes)
  - John Thomas Romney Robinson: invented the cup anemometer and measured the position of Armagh with rockets
  - Harry Ferguson: pioneered the modern tractor system
6. North West:
  - John Mackereth: invented the pneumatic mud corer (Mackereth corer) for taking samples from lake beds
  - John Gough (natural philosopher): blind naturalist who could identify any plant by taste and touch
  - Thomas Edmondson: inventor of the railway ticket
  - John Dalton: meteorologist and pioneer of atomic theory
  - James Prescott Joule: devised modern ideas about heat
  - Joseph Whitworth: revolutionised engineering by defining standard screw threads

== Series 2 ==
1 Devon: Isambard Kingdom Brunel: Henry Moule: Thomas Savery: Mary Anning:

2 Scotland: Alexander Bain (inventor): Electro-chemical telegraph Charles Macintosh: Mac James Clerk Maxwell: Robert Stirling: Inventor James Gregory (mathematician): Mathematician

3 East: William Harvey: Reformed incorrect thinking about the circulation of blood. Robert Fitzroy: Pioneered storm warning system and invented the weather forecast. Benjamin Wiseman: Patented a Windmill in 1783. William Hase: Modified prison treadmills to take power outside the prison. William Gilberd: Discovered the earth is a magnet. John Jeyes: Invented a unique three-function toilet cleaner Jeyes Fluid. William Hyde Wollaston: Invented a clever mirror-and-prism device (Camera lucida) that lets you see your subject superimposed on your sketch pad.

4 North East: John Walker (inventor): Invented the friction match. Charles Algernon Parsons: Invented the steam turbine. Joseph Wilson Swan: Invented the incandescent light bulb. Lewis Fry Richardson: Inventor of sonar and the understanding of the mathematics of the weather. Thomas Wright (astronomer): First to understand the Milky Way. Gladstone Adams: Invented the windscreen wiper.

5 Wales: Thomas Telford: Developed a system for road building & built bridges. Alfred Russel Wallace: Devised theory of natural selection jointly with Darwin. William Price (physician): Pioneer of cremation. Harry Grindell Matthews: Invented a portable radio, and supposed Death Ray inventor. Richard Trevithick: Ran world's first steam locomotive at Merthyr. Robert Recorde: Invented equals sign. Hugh Owen Thomas (and the bonesetters of Anglesey): Four generations of bonesetters and founder of orthopaedic surgery.

6 South East: Samuel Morland: Invented giant megaphones and was master mechanic to Charles II Hertha Ayrton: Invented way of clearing trenches of Mustard Gas. Eleanor Coade: Her artificial stone was used for many landmarks. Henry Maudslay: Founder of precision engineering and first production line. Thomas Young (scientist): Discovered how the eye works and translated the Rosetta Stone. Liborio Pedrazzoli: Inventor of swimming umbrellas. Ralph Wedgwood (inventor): Invented carbon paper. William Willoughby Cole Verner: Invented cavalry sketching board to enable cavalrymen to make accurate maps whilst on horseback.

== Series 3 ==
1 Devon and Cornwall: Thomas Newcomen et al.

2 London: Cornelius Drebbel et al.

3 South: Robert Hooke et al.

4 Special – Egypt

5 Special – Italy

6 Special – Science Week

== Series 4 ==
1 South: Henry Cavendish et al.

2 East of Scotland: James Dewar et al.

3 Cotswolds: William Henry Fox Talbot et al.

4 St Pauls: Heroines
