= Blood of the Vikings =

2001 BBC Television documentary series

- Hodder & Stoughton Book Cover
- Genre: Documentary
- Presented by: Julian Richards
- Composer: David Mitcham
- Country of origin: United Kingdom
- Original language: English
- No. of series: 1
- No. of episodes: 5

Production
- Executive producer: Caroline van den Brul
- Producers: Suzanne Levy; Sam Roberts; Liz Tucker

Original release
- Network: BBC Two
- Release: 6 November – 4 December 2001

Related
- Meet the Ancestors

Blood of the Vikings was a five-part 2001 BBC Television documentary series that traced the legacy of the Vikings in the British Isles through a genetics survey.

== Production ==
The series was presented by Julian Richards who has a long-held fascination with the Vikings.

"Considering their huge impact, there's not a lot of archaeological evidence for them. You also have to question some of the history – it was mostly written by their victims. I'm fascinated by the idea of the genetics project and the idea that we may be able to discover the Viking in all of us."

— Julian Richards

Geneticist Professor David Goldstein, from University College London, lead the 15-month study that compared mouth swabs from 2,500 male volunteers from 25 different locations across the country with DNA samples from Scandinavian locals to find out how much Viking heritage remains in the UK.

"Modern genetics has opened up a powerful new window on the past."

— Professor David Goldstein

The study traced the past movements of peoples to discover how many Vikings stayed after the raids. The study of history and archaeology alone could not answer this question.

"The question is how Viking are the people of the British Isles and where are the most Viking people of the British Isles."

— Producer Paul Bradshaw

BBC Two Controller Jane Root described the station's work with UCL as a unique, nationwide project.

"This is the kind of thing that the BBC does so well; pooling our expertise in TV and online, in science and education in an endeavour that will enable all of us to find out more about our genetic origins."

— BBC Two Controller Jane Root

The research confirmed that the Vikings did not just raid and retreat to Scandinavia, but settled in Britain for years. They left their genetic pattern in some parts of the UK population. Concentrations of Norwegian genetic heritage were found in part of Cumbria in northwest England, the area around Penrith, the Shetland and Orkney Islands and the far north of the Scottish mainland.

In addition the research revealed surprising new information about Celtic and Anglo-Saxon heritage on the British mainland. Men who were tested in mainland Scotland had a percentage of Celtic genetic heritage similar to the population of southern England. This showed 1) that Celtic heritage persisted among men in southern England after Anglo-Saxon settlement; and 2) that the Scots were not predominantly Celtic.

The series included clips from Richard Fleischer's 1958 film The Vikings starring Kirk Douglas to illustrate common modern attitudes towards the Vikings.

== Episodes ==
Episode	Title	First Broadcast
1	First Blood	2001-11-06
2	Invasion	2001-11-13
3	The Sea Road	2001-11-20
4	Rulers	2001-11-27
5	The Last of the Vikings	2001-12-04

== Companion book ==
- Richards, Julian (4 October 2001). Blood of the Vikings. Hodder & Stoughton (hardcover). ISBN 978-0-340-73385-1.
- Richards, Julian (4 July 2002). Blood of the Vikings. Hodder & Stoughton (paperback). ISBN 978-0-340-73386-8.
