= Ian Potts =

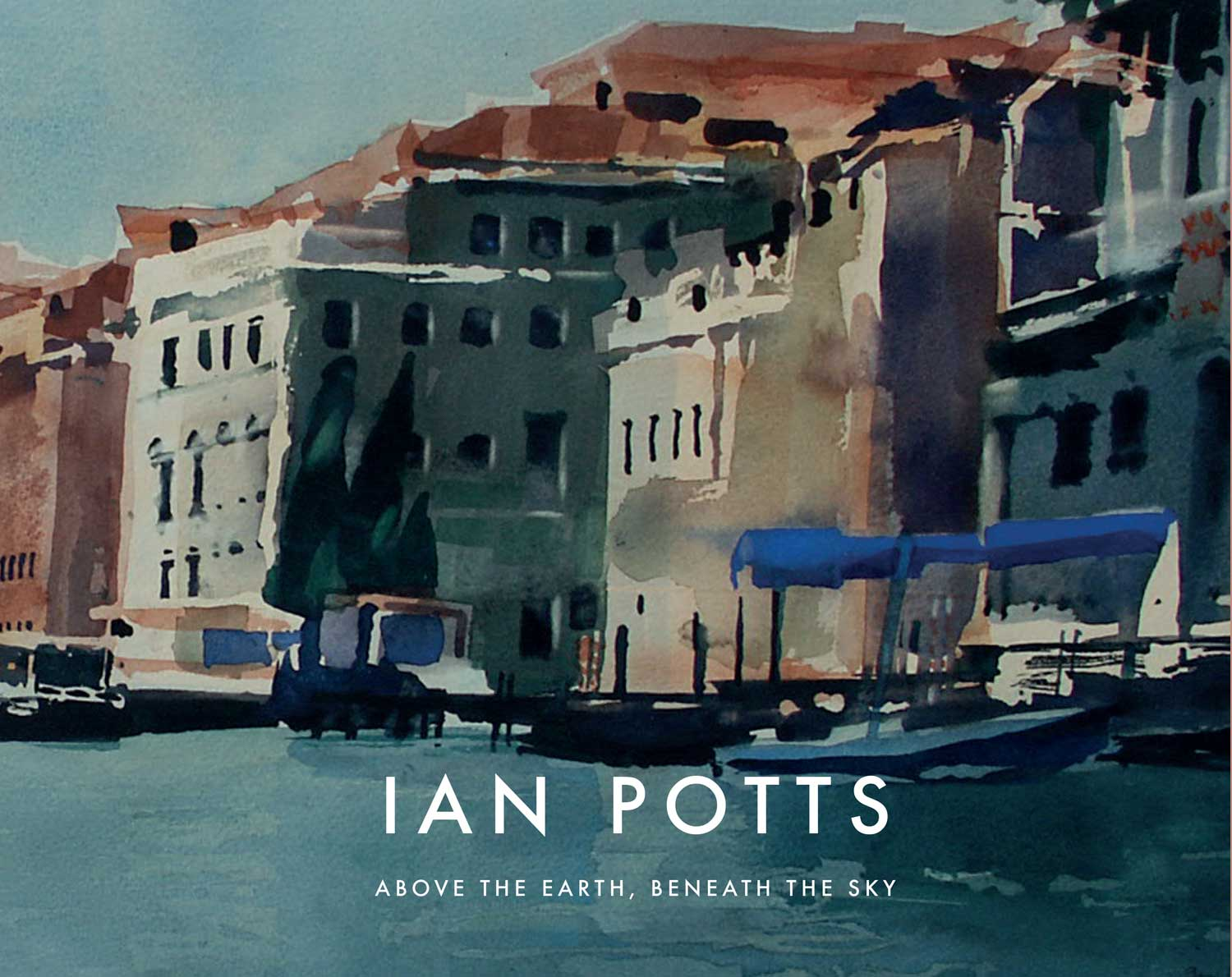
Detail of Ian Potts' watercolour of Venice used for the front cover of exhibition catalogue, Ian Potts Above the Earth, Beneath the Sky

Ian Potts (1936–2014) was a painter and educator, who was head of the painting department at the Brighton College of Art and exhibited largely as a watercolour landscape artist.

Potts’ work has been added to several public and private collections; including the Victoria and Albert Museum, London; Arts Council collection; Towner Gallery, Eastbourne; Hove Museum, East Sussex Council; as well as the University of Brighton's Aldrich Collection.

== Early life ==
Ian Potts was born into a mining family in Birtley, County Durham, the only child of Noble and Annie Potts. His artistic talent was first spotted at Chester-le-Street Modern School. At 17 he went to Sunderland College of Art, where he studied fine art and won a scholarship to the Royal Academy Schools in London. His graduation in 1958 was distinguished by the award of the silver medal for Painting, which led in turn to his appointment to Brighton College of Art.

In 1959 Potts married a fellow student of the Sunderland College of Art, Helen Bewick. He began his professional career with a travel scholarship which enabled attendance at the [British School at Athens]. This began Potts' professional interest as a travel painter and painter of European and Mediterranean landscapes.

== Career at Brighton School of Art ==
Ian Potts joined the Brighton College of Art as a painting teacher in 1963. During his long career he became Head of Painting during his career at the college, as well as Deputy Head of Fine Art. He retired in 1995, having enhanced the regional, national and international reputation of the institution, helping to guide its role in the new Brighton Polytechnic and later the University of Brighton.

Josie Reed recalls in her obituary for The Guardian in 2014 that Potts "was a popular tutor, known to his students – who included the Turner Prize winner Rachel Whiteread – as Uncle Ian. A skilled poker player, Potts held his own in games against the head of department, Gwyther Irwin, who reputedly had once earned his living playing poker."

== Career as an exhibiting artist ==
Potts was a life-long traveller, bringing this experience to his experiments with landscape composition and the watercolour medium. Of Potts' initial use of watercolour Michael Tucker notes: "it was at first its mundane convenience that drew him to it, as the most practical means of taking note of what was immediately in front of him and visually so intrigued him. He would for ever be a great and curious traveller, and from the time, shortly after his graduation from the Royal Academy Schools, when a travel scholarship took him for a while to the British School at Athens, he would have sketch-book and box of watercolours always in his bag."

Ian Potts' travel painting included works set in Italy and Greece, Egypt and Spain, as well as much of Britain. In the late 1970s, Potts represented Great Britain in the International Painting Symposium held at Prilep in the former Yugoslavia.

Gavin Murray described his work: "But however many distinctions we may detect, and at a time when abstraction and collage are popular, Ian's work is remarkable for sustaining the representative tradition in English watercolour painting. While moving on from the Classical, the Picturesque, the Vernacular and the neo-Romantic styles that mark the history of English landscape painting Ian advanced the English watercolour tradition just as Cotman and Girtin did before him." Exhibition catalogue, 2001, Gavin Murray, Director of Keynes Gallery at the University of Kent, Canterbury.

== Later life and legacy ==
Ian Potts said, “I see my watercolours as an extension to the history of English watercolour painting – absolutely within the tradition, but moving forward a bit, I hope. There is a direct line from artists such as J. M. W. Turner and John Sell Cotman to the present day. A more modern artist I admire was Edward Burra though he was working with a world inside himself, whereas I look to the world outside.” Quoted from Ken Gofton, 'Watercolour Artist' magazine, August 2014

William Packer, principal art critic of the Financial Times 1974–2004, said, "As a painter, Ian stands quite consciously – for he knew full well what he was up to – within the great English, or rather British watercolour tradition. So much is obvious; but simply to invoke the great names of Turner or Girtin, Cox or Cotman is perhaps to miss the point, for the tradition continued to develop and ramify through the next two hundred years."

A major retrospective of Potts' work was held at the University of Brighton galleries July/August 2016.
