= Hart-Davis =

Hart-Davis is a surname. Notable people with the surname include:

- Adam Hart-Davis (born 1943), English scientist, author, photographer, historian and broadcaster; son of Rupert Hart-Davis and brother of Duff Hart-Davis
- Alice Hart-Davis (born 1963), British journalist and author; daughter of Duff Hart-Davis
- Deirdre Hart-Davis (1909–1999), English socialite; sister of Rupert Hart-Davis
- Duff Hart-Davis (1936–2025), British biographer, naturalist and journalist; son of Rupert Hart-Davis, brother of Adam Hart-Davis, and father of Alice Hart-Davis
- Geoffrey Hart-Davis (1905–1941), South African cricketer
- Jack Hart-Davis (1900–1963), South African cricket umpire
- Rupert Hart-Davis (1907–1999), British publisher, literary editor, and man of letters; brother of Deirdre Hart-Davis and father of Duff and Adam Hart-Davis

== Others ==
- Hart Davis (1791–1854), British politician, MP for Colchester 1812–18
- Hart-Davis, MacGibbon, British publishing house
- Lyttelton/Hart-Davis Letters, Rupert Hart-Davis' published volumes of correspondence with George William Lyttelton
- William Hart Davis, pen name of Bill Pronzini (born 1943), American writer
- William Watts Hart Davis (1820–1910), American brigadier general

== See also ==
- Hart (surname)
- Davis (surname)
