= Seven Seas =

Ancient phrase for all of the world's known seas

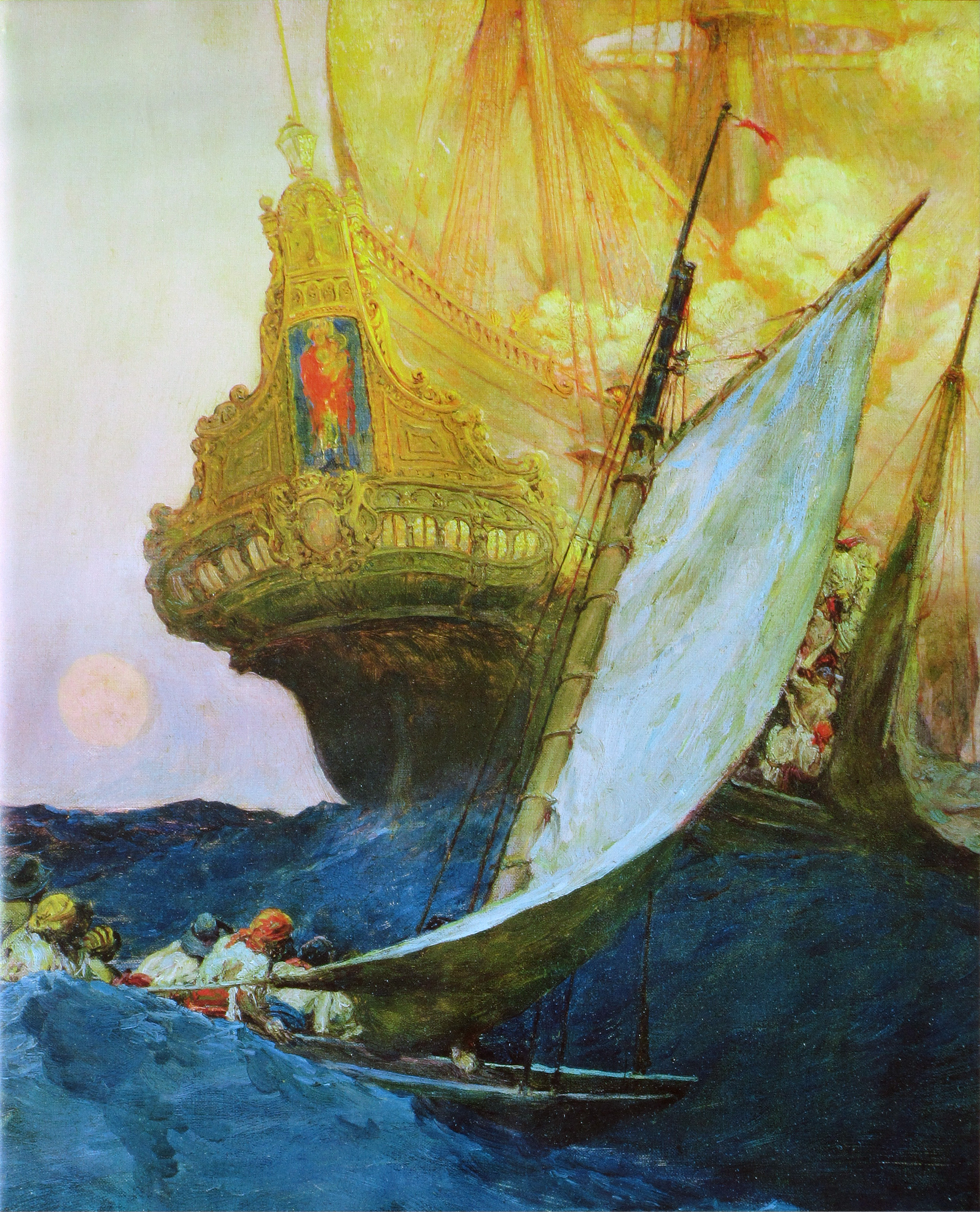
The term "Seven Seas" is commonly associated with pirates in fiction (An Attack on a Galleon by Howard Pyle, 1905)

"The Seven Seas" is a figurative term for all the seas of the known world and has existed since antiquity. Its earliest known appearance is in a Sumerian hymn dated to approximately 2300 BCE, and the phrase was subsequently adopted and frequently used by the ancient Greeks. The specific bodies of water referred to as the "Seven Seas" have varied significantly by era and culture, generally reflecting the maritime geography known to the inhabitants of a specific region at the time. The phrase is typically used in reference to sailors and pirates in the arts and popular culture, and can be associated with the Mediterranean Sea, the Arabian Seven Seas east of Africa and the Indian subcontinent (as told with Sinbad's seven journeys, and Captain Kidd), or is sometimes applied to the Caribbean Sea and seas around the Americas (with pirates such as Blackbeard).

The terminology of a "seven seas" with varying definitions was part of the vernacular of several peoples, long before the oceans of the world became known (to those peoples).

Following global exploration, the catalogue of known waterways expanded significantly. Contemporary geographers now recognize approximately fifty distinct seas worldwide, rendering the term "Seven Seas" largely metaphorical in modern usage. The term can now also be taken to refer to these seven oceanic bodies of water:

- the Arctic Ocean
- the North Atlantic Ocean
- the South Atlantic Ocean
- the Indian Ocean
- the North Pacific Ocean
- the South Pacific Ocean
- the Southern (or Antarctic) Ocean

The International Hydrographic Organization lists over 23 distinct bodies of water called seas.

The modern practice of debating which bodies of water are the seven seas is separate from the etymology of the term. Plausible etymologies are discussed below including the Po river delta in the north Adriatic sea. The phrase's association with the world oceans in the late 19th century is characterized by Rudyard Kipling's 1896 book The Seven Seas.

== Arabs ==
The Arabs and their near neighbours considered the Seven Seas (Arabic: البحار السبعة) to be the seas that they encountered in their voyages to The East. They were trading routes in ancient times and since the time of Muhammad, they are the places where Islam spread and is widely practised.

In the 9th century CE, author Ya'qubi wrote:

Whoever wants to go to China must cross seven seas, each one with its own color and wind and fish and breeze, completely unlike the sea that lies beside it. The first of them is the Sea of Fars, which men sail setting out from Siraf. It ends at Ra's al-Jumha; it is a strait where pearls are fished. The second sea begins at Ra's al-Jumha and is called Larwi. It is a big sea, and in it is the Island of Waqwaq and others that belong to the Zanj. These islands have kings. One can only sail this sea by the stars. It contains huge fish, and in it are many wonders and things that pass description. The third sea is called Harkand, and in it lies the Island of Sarandib, in which are precious stones and rubies. Here are islands with kings, but there is one king over them. In the islands of this sea grow bamboo and rattan. The fourth sea is called Kalah-bar and is shallow and filled with huge serpents. Sometimes they ride the wind and smash ships. Here are islands where the camphor tree grows. The fifth sea is called Salahit and is very large and filled with wonders. The sixth sea is called Kardanj; it is very rainy. The seventh sea is called the sea of Sanji, also known as Kanjli. It is the sea of China; one is driven by the south wind until one reaches a freshwater bay, along which are fortified places and cities, until one reaches Khanfu.

This passage demonstrates the Seven Seas as referenced in Medieval Arabian literature:

- The Persian Gulf ("Sea of Fars")
- The Arabian Sea ("Sea of Larwi")
- The Bay of Bengal ("Sea of Harkand")
- The Strait of Malacca ("Sea of Kalah")
- The Singapore Strait ("Sea of Salahit")
- The Gulf of Thailand ("Sea of Kadranj")
- The South China Sea ("Sea of Sanji")

Arab seafarers may have also considered other important seas nearby which they navigated regularly, including the Black Sea, Caspian Sea, Red Sea, Mediterranean Sea, and Adriatic Sea.

== East Indies ==
In British Colonial times the Clipper Ship Tea Route from China to England was the longest trade route in the world. It took sailors through seven seas near the Dutch East Indies: the Banda Sea, the Celebes Sea, the Flores Sea, the Java Sea, the South China Sea, the Sulu Sea, and the Timor Sea. The Seven Seas referred to those seas, and if someone had "sailed the Seven Seas" it meant they had sailed to, and returned from, the other side of the world.

== Greeks ==
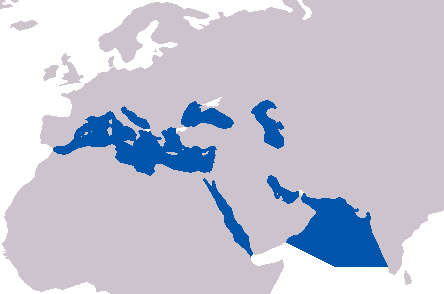
Historic seven seas

The term in modern usage originated from Greece, where the seven seas were considered as:

- The Adriatic Sea
- The Aegean Sea
- The Black Sea
- The Caspian Sea
- The Mediterranean Sea
- The Persian Sea
- The Red Sea

== Romans ==
The meaning of septem maria (Latin) in Ancient Rome is different than the phrase "seven seas" in the modern era. The navigable network in the mouths of the Po river discharges into saltmarshes on the Adriatic shore and was colloquially called the "Seven Seas" in ancient Roman times. Pliny the Elder, a Roman author and fleet commander, wrote about these lagoons, separated from the open sea by sandbanks:

All those rivers and trenches were first made by the Etruscans, thus discharging the flow of the river across the marshes of the Atriani called the Seven Seas, with the famous harbor of the Etruscan town of Atria which formerly gave the name of Atriatic to the sea now called the Adriatic.

A History of Venice states:

The expression "to sail the seven seas" was a classical flourish signifying nautical skill. It was applied to the Venetians long before they sailed the oceans.

It is plausible that the English idiom is borrowed from this Venetian idiom, with a loss of geographic context.

== Persians ==
The Persians used the term "the Seven Seas" to refer to the streams forming the Oxus River.

== Talmudists ==
The Babylonian Talmud mentions seven seas and four rivers that surround the land of Israel. In Tractate Bava Batra, fol. 74b, it reads:

When R. Dimi came he said R. Yohanan said: "What is the meaning of the verse, 'For he hath founded it upon the seas and established it upon the floods.' (Ps. 24:2)? This refers to the seven seas and four rivers that surround the land of Israel. And what are the seven seas? The Sea of Tiberias, the Sea of Sodom, the Sea of Helath, the Sea of Hiltha, the Sea of Sibkay, the Sea of Aspamia and the Great Sea. And what are the four rivers? The Jordan, the Yarmuk, the Keramyhon and Pigah."

According to this and other passages, the Talmudic Seven Seas include:

- Sea of Tiberias (Lake Tiberias or The Sea of Galilee)
- Sea of Sodom (The Dead Sea)
- Sea of Helath (The Red Sea)
- Sea of Hiltha (Lake Ram)
- Sea of Sibkay (Lake Hula)
- Sea of Aspamia (A lake said to be north of Apamia on the Asi River, possibly the formerly flooded Al-Ghab Plain)
- The Great Sea (The Mediterranean Sea)

Various transliterations for the sea names from Hebrew exist. For Helath: Chelath and Shelyith. For Hiltha: Chiltha and Chultha. For Sibkay: Sibchi and Somcho. And for Aspamia: Apamia.

The 17th century churchman and scholar John Lightfoot mentions this set of seas in his Commentary on the New Testament. A chapter titled The Seven Seas according to the Talmudists, and the four Rivers compassing the Land includes the "Great Sea" (now called the Mediterranean Sea), the "Sea of Tiberias" (Sea of Galilee), the "Sea of Sodom" (Dead Sea), the "Lake of Samocho" (probably the (mostly) dried-up Hula Lake, called Semechonitis by Josephus and lake Sumchi in the Talmud), also called the "Sibbichaean". Lightfoot does not comment on the remaining three seas.

== Early modern ==
Modern boundaries of marginal seas, numbering far more than seven.

After the discovery of the Americas during the Age of Discovery, the "seven seas" were reckoned by some as:

- the Pacific Ocean
- the Atlantic Ocean
- the Indian Ocean
- the Arctic Ocean
- the Mediterranean Sea
- the Caribbean Sea
- the Gulf of Mexico

The last two of these are now reckoned to be part of the Atlantic Ocean, and the Mediterranean either part of the Atlantic or omitted. Splitting the Atlantic and Pacific into north and south and adding the Southern Ocean returns the list to seven.

Detailed reckonings of the divisions of the world ocean into oceans and seas is not limited to lists of seven. For example, the International Hydrographic Organization recognizes many marginal seas; some saltwater lakes and the freshwater Sea of Galilee also have "sea" in their names.

== See also ==
- Clime
- Four continents
- Four Seas
- Jambudvīpa
- Karshvar
- Roof of the World
- Sapta Sindhu
- 7th Sea (collectible card game)
- 7Seas, card game based on Scopa
