= Lord Norwich =

Lord Norwich may refer to:

- Earl of Norwich, various titles in the Peerage of England and the Peerage of Great Britain
- Viscount Norwich, a title in the Peerage of the United Kingdom created in 1952
