= Agnes Duff, Countess Fife =

Scottish aristocrat

The Right Honourable The Countess Fife
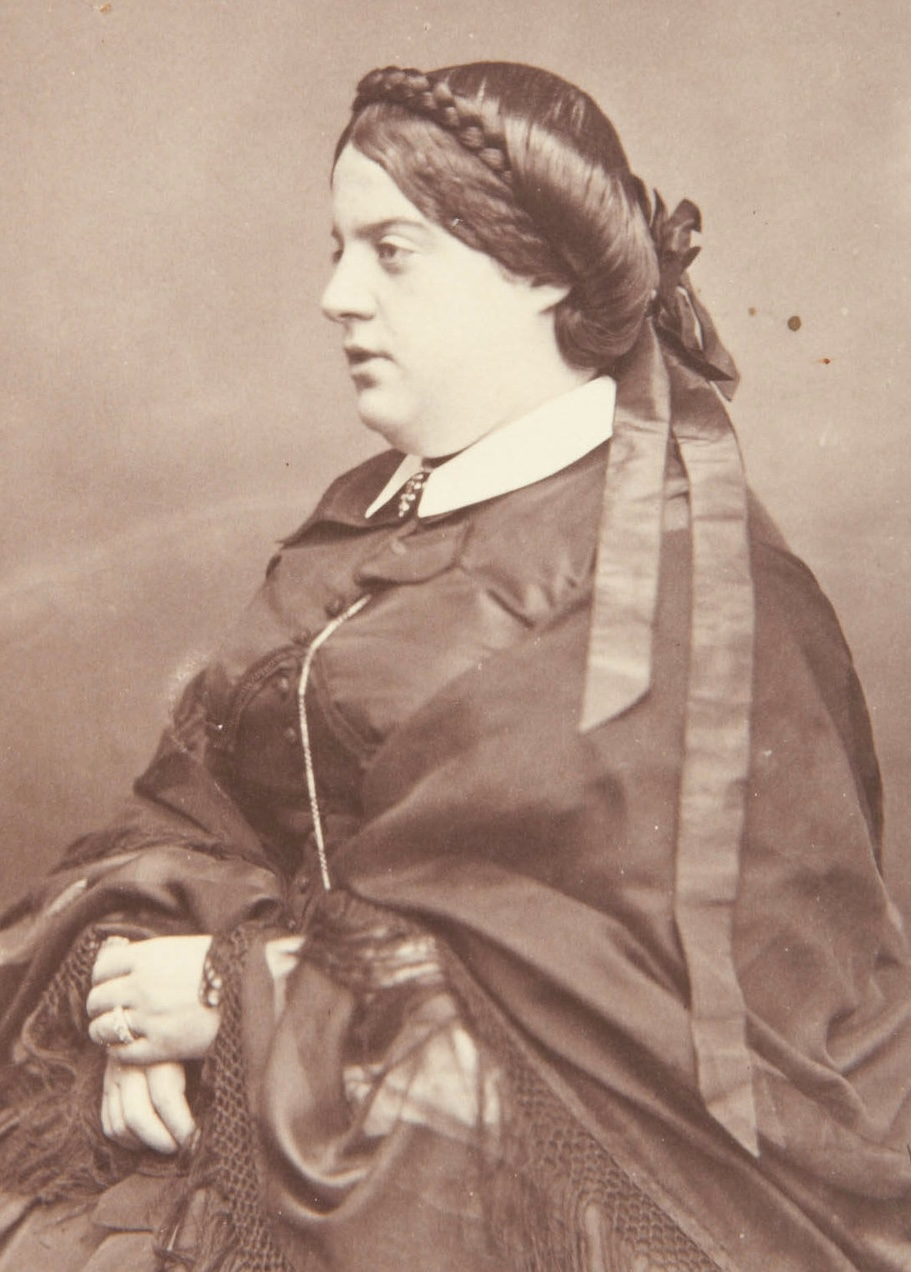
- The Countess in c. 1859
- Born: Agnes Georgiana Elizabeth Hay; 12 May 1829; Dublin, Ireland
- Died: 18 December 1869 (aged 40); London, England
- Spouse: James Duff, 5th Earl Fife (m. 1846)
- Children: Anne Townshend, Marchioness Townshend; Lady Ida Wilson; Alexander Duff, 1st Duke of Fife; Lady Alexina Coventry; Lady Agnes Cooper; Lady Mary Duff
- Parents: William Hay, 18th Earl of Erroll (father); Elizabeth FitzClarence (mother)

Agnes Georgiana Elizabeth Duff, Countess Fife (née Hay; 12 May 1829 – 18 December 1869) was a Scottish noblewoman and philanthropist who served as Countess of Fife following her husband's succession in 1857.

== Life and work ==
Lady Agnes was born on 12 May 1829 in Dublin, Ireland, as the second daughter of William Hay, 18th Earl of Erroll, Hereditary Great Constable of Scotland, and his wife Elizabeth FitzClarence. Through her mother, she was a granddaughter of King William IV, as Elizabeth FitzClarence was one of the King's illegitimate children by Dorothea Jordan. She received her upbringing under the close supervision of her mother.

Following the death of her husband's uncle, James Duff, 4th Earl Fife on 9 March 1857, her husband succeeded as 5th Earl of Fife, at which point she became Countess of Fife. Most of their children were born during the couple's residence at Skene House, Aberdeenshire, where Lady Fife managed the household and devoted considerable attention to charitable and domestic responsibilities. The fortunes of the family rose significantly upon the death of the then Earl of Fife, when James Duff succeeded to the title. As a cousin of Queen Victoria, she was reportedly held in high regard by the Queen, and the family benefited from renewed social prominence and financial security following the inheritance of the Fife estates.

The revival of the role of Countess on the Fife estates there having been none since the death of Dorothea Duff, Countess of Fife, more than fifty years earlier provided Lady Agnes with wide scope for her administrative and organisational abilities, leading her to oversee the renovation and expansion of Innes House, the redecoration of Duff House and restoration of its art collection, and the enlargement of Corriemulzie Lodge into New Mar Lodge. She also took a sustained interest in the welfare of the tenants in Banffshire and Morayshire, regularly seeking information on agricultural conditions, tenant prospects, and local hardships, and during the cattle plague actively monitoring the measures undertaken to control the disease and compensate affected farmers.

Lady Fife was an early and enthusiastic supporter of the Volunteer Force. She presented silver bugles to volunteer artillery and rifle units in Banffshire, and later in Morayshire, helping to stimulate recruitment and public interest. Her support was noted as consistent and energetic.

Her charitable activities included annual distributions of clothing and necessities to the poor in Braemar and other parts of the estates. One of her final charitable acts, before leaving the north for the last time, was the distribution of blankets, tea, sugar, and other essentials to the poor of Macduff.

== Marriage and family ==
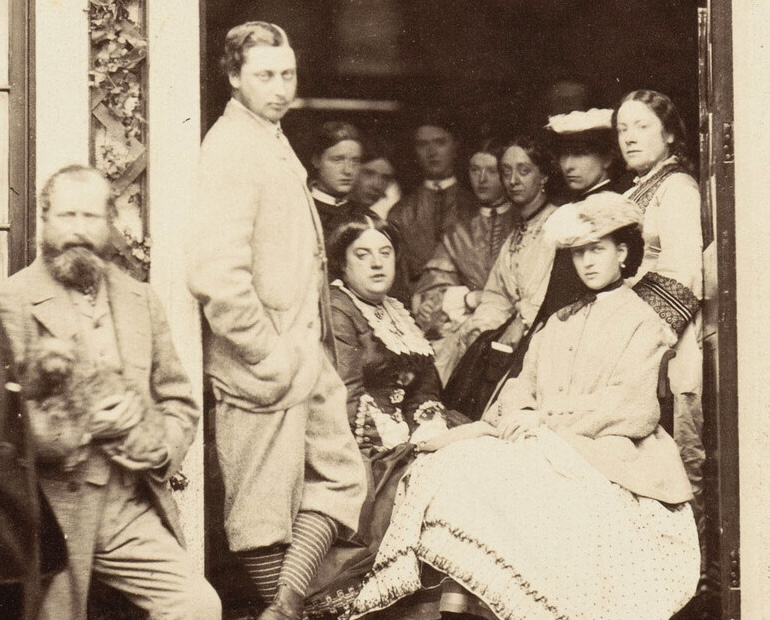
James Duff, 5th Earl Fife and Agnes, Countess of Fife, with the Prince and Princess of Wales in September 1863

On 16 March 1846, Hay was married to James Duff, son of General Hon. Sir Alexander Duff and Anne Stein, at the British Embassy in Paris, France. Duff later inherited the earldom of Fife upon the death of his uncle in 1857. The marriage had issue:

- Lady Anne Elizabeth Clementina Duff (16 August 1847 – 31 December 1925) married John Townshend, 5th Marquess Townshend (1831–1899) on 17 October 1865. They had two children, including John Townshend, 6th Marquess Townshend.
- Lady Ida Louisa Alice Duff (11 December 1848 – 29 May 1918) married Adrian Elias Hope (1845–1919) on 3 June 1867. They had one daughter and later divorced. She married, secondly, William Wilson (1839–1905), a London stockbroker, on 20 September 1880.
- Alexander William George Duff (10 November 1849 – 29 January 1912) married Louise, Princess Royal (1867–1931), the eldest daughter of then Edward, Prince of Wales, later Edward VII, and Alexandra of Denmark, on 27 July 1889. He was created the Duke of Fife in 1889.
- Lady Alexina Duff (20 Mar 1851 – 30 Apr 1882) married Henry Aubrey Coventry (1845–1909), grandson of George Coventry, 8th Earl of Coventry, on 2 July 1870.
- Lady Agnes Cecil Emmeline Duff (1852–1925) married, firstly, George Robert Hay-Drummond (1849–1886), son of George Hay-Drummond, 12th Earl of Kinnoull, on 4 Oct 1871. They had issue, but later divorced. She married, secondly, Herbert Flower (1853–1881), brother of Cyril Flower, 1st Baron Battersea, on 5 August 1876. She married thirdly, Alfred Cooper (1838–1908) on 4 July 1882, whose descendants include former British prime minister David Cameron, as well as Duff Cooper, Rupert Hart-Davis, and Deirdre Hart-Davis.
- Lady Mary Hamilton Duff (20 February 1854 – 20 March 1854)

== Later life and death ==
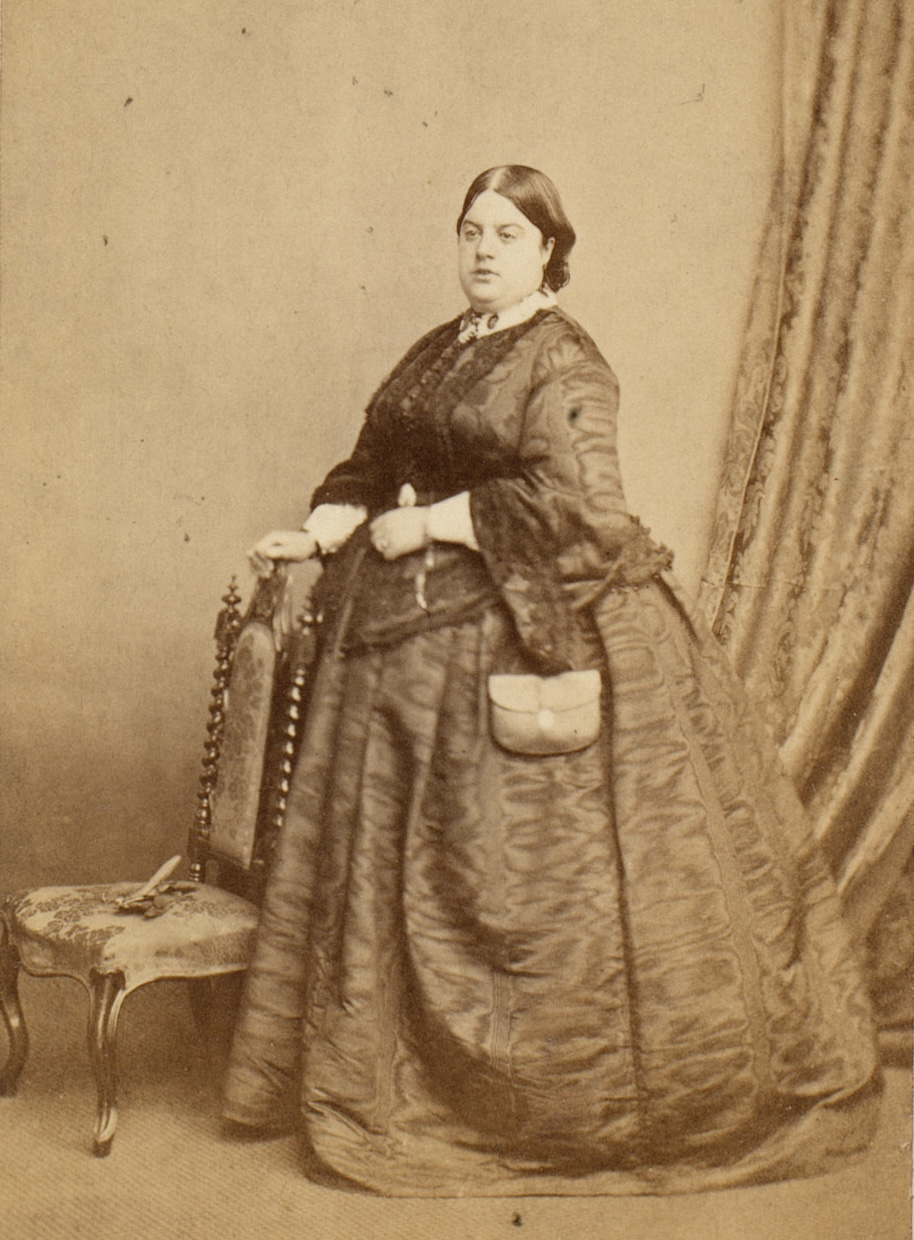
The Countess of Fife in her later years, c. 1860-65

Lady Fife's health declined after an accident on 17 June 1867, in which she fell while stepping from her carriage and suffered a fractured limb. Although she resumed many public duties, her constitution was weakened, and she experienced recurring periods of illness.

On 18 December 1869, while in London, she collapsed from apoplexy (stroke) and died almost instantaneously in the arms of her son, Viscount Macduff, after becoming fatigued and attempting to retire to her bedroom. She was 40 years old.

Her death received widespread attention in Scotland. Churches in Banff and Macduff commemorated her the following morning, and expressions of sympathy were sent by Queen Victoria, the Prince of Wales, Prince Leopold, and various noble families. Local newspapers noted that her death caused a depth of public sorrow not seen since the death of the Prince Consort.

She predeceased her husband by many years, and her loss was particularly noted given his recent bereavement from the death of his sister only twelve days earlier.
