= Ronald Balfour =

Ronald Balfour may refer to:

- Ronald Edmond Balfour (1904–1945), British medieval historian
- Ronald Egerton Balfour (1896–1941), British illustrator and costume designer
