= Deirdre Hart-Davis =

British socialite, gallery owner and model (1909–1998)

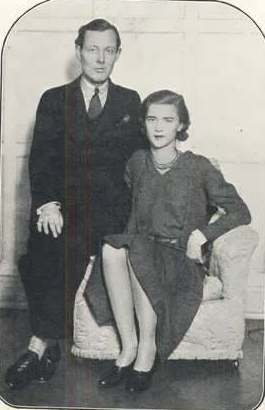
- Hart-Davis and Ronald Balfour in 1929
- Born: Deirdre Phyllis Ulrica Hart-Davis; 5 July 1909; London, England
- Died: 23 November 1998 (aged 89); Lewes, East Sussex, England
- Other names: Deirdre Balfour; Deirdre Wolfers; Deirdre Bland; Deirdre Inman
- Occupations: Socialite; gallery owner
- Spouses: Ronald Balfour (m. 1930; died 1941) David Wolfers (m. 1945; div. 1949) Anthony Bland (m. 1950; div. 1971) William Inman (m. 1984; died 1994)
- Children: 3
- Relatives: Rupert Hart-Davis (brother); Alfred Cooper (grandfather); Lady Agnes Cecil Emmeline Duff (grandmother); Duff Hart-Davis (nephew); Adam Hart-Davis (nephew)

Deirdre Phyllis Ulrica Hart-Davis (later Balfour, Wolfers, Bland, and Inman; 5 July 1909 – 23 November 1998) was an English socialite, gallery owner and model, included in The Book of Beauty by Cecil Beaton. She became a famous beauty and a beacon of style.

== Biography ==
Deirdre Phyllis Ulrica Hart-Davis was born on 5 July 1909 the only daughter of Richard Vaughan Hart-Davis and Sybil Mary Cooper. She was the niece of Lady Diana Cooper and Duff Cooper. She had one brother, Rupert Charles Hart-Davis. Hart-Davis was a 3rd great-granddaughter of King William IV. William had several illegitimate children with his mistress, Dorothea Jordan. Their youngest daughter, Lady Elizabeth Fitzclarence, later Countess of Erroll, had daughters including Lady Agnes Hay. Lady Agnes married James Duff, 5th Earl Fife and among their children was Lady Agnes Duff, who married Sir Alfred Cooper. Their children included Sybil Cooper, paternal grandmother of Deirdre Hart-Davis.

As a child, Deirdre and Rupert Hart-Davis were drawn by Augustus John and painted by William Nicholson (1912). Her coming-out dance in 1928 was held by her aunt, Lady Diana Cooper, at 34 Grosvenor Street, whose "café au lait ball-room made a very good setting for the many pretty girls who came". The Sketch wrote: "Miss Deirdre Hart-Davis, is one of the loveliest debutantes of this year and is greatly admired in society [...] Our photographic study shows Miss Hart-Davis in the flame-coloured taffeta dress which she wore when she acted as the bridesmaid at the marriage of Miss Wanda Holden to the Hon. Charles Baillie-Hamilton. It is adorned with a black lace scarf, which looks most effective."

On 24 April 1930 she married Ronald Egerton Balfour, the only son of Brigadier-General Sir Alfred Granville Balfour and Lady Alfred Granville Balfour, the daughter of Sir Benjamin Simpson. They had two daughters, Susan and Annabel. Ronald Balfour died during World War II killed in a car accident.

Cecil Beaton, who included her in The Book of Beauty in 1933, used her as model as well.

After she was a widow, she moved to New York City and worked for the British Information Services moving back to London at the end of the war.

She married a second time to David Wolfers. Her friends included Gerald Barry, Hugh Casson and Lawrence Gowing.

She married a third time to Anthony John Bland, an academic lawyer. They had one daughter, Lucy. In the 1960s the family moved to Lewes, Sussex, to be near Sussex University where Bland was Reader of Law. They separated when Bland moved to the University of West Indies.

From 1973 to 1987 she ran the Southover Gallery out of her own home in Lewes and she exhibited, among others, Duncan Grant, Quentin Bell, Julian Trevelyan, Mary Fedden, John Nash and Eric Rolfe.

She married a fourth and last time to Maurice William Inman. Inman took care of her when she developed Parkinson's disease from which she died on 23 November 1998.
