= A Short History of Byzantium =

Book by John Julius Norwich

- Author: John Julius Norwich
- Genre: History
- Publication date: 1997

A Short History of Byzantium (1997) is a history of the Byzantine Empire by historian John Julius Norwich. It is a condensed version of his earlier three-volume work on the same subject, published from 1988 to 1995 in 1200 pages, which is approximately one page per year of historical time covered.

Norwich's thesis (as stated in the introduction) is that Byzantium left behind a rich legacy, both as a cultural powerhouse and as a bulwark protecting Western Europe against invaders like the Sasanian Empire and the Arab Caliphate. The history of the Empire is considered in its entirety, from the reign of Constantine the Great to the Fall of Constantinople in 1453 AD. Historical events like the Fall of the Western Roman Empire, Byzantine Iconoclasm, and the Crusades are discussed. The various palace coups and court intrigues involving the emperors and their families are also covered. Lists of reigning emperors, sultans, and popes are provided in the appendixes.

The condensed version was published by Viking Press originally in London, then by Knopf in New York.

The book was mentioned in episode 4, series 9 of the British television sitcom Peep Show, where protagonist Mark Corrigan asks historian Angus whether there is a "comprehensive history of the Byzantine church... for the general reader", to which Angus replies "No there isn't, unless you count John Julius Norwich's so-called History of Byzantium."
