= Absolute Monarchs =

2011 book by John Julius Norwich

Absolute Monarchs: A History of the Papacy
- Author: John Julius Norwich
- Language: English
- Genre: popular history
- Published: 12 July 2011
- Publisher: Random House
- Publication place: United States
- ISBN: 978-1400067152

Absolute Monarchs: A History of the Papacy is a 2011 book by the English popular historian John Julius Norwich published in the United States by Random House. It was published slightly earlier in the UK by Chatto & Windus under the title The Popes: A History. It was introduced after Norwich had progressively built his reputation with more than twenty previous published titles and received significant notice in the press.

== Synopsis ==
As indicated by its title, this is a history of the popes, from Saint Peter to Pope Benedict XVI. Although primarily factual, Norwich enlivens the historical record by sharing commentary and indicating motivations for the parties' decisions and actions. For example, in treating Charles Martel, Norwich asks if he would stop the advance of the Lombards and answers, "Perhaps, but he would not be hurried." Accordingly, the reader is presented with the grand strategy and moral dilemmas of the times, providing a sense of the drama present in every age.

Norwich comments that Pope Gregory I (term 590 – 604) "was an administrator of genius, an organizer and a missionary; he was not and never could be, an abstract thinker or theologian, or even a politician." Further he was, "[p]ious but practical, he intended the Patrimony of Peter to be a huge charitable fund, at the immediate disposal of the Church for the benefit of the poor — every day twelve paupers shared his table."

Norwich also details the low points of the institution. In the mid-10th century, the de facto ruler of Rome, and therefore the papacy, was the "ravishingly beautiful but sinister figure of Marozia, senatrix of Rome." Pope John X, who showed signs of acting independently was, "struck down in the Lateran, before his brother's eyes" and later "deposed and imprisoned in the Castle Sant'Angelo, where he was soon afterward smothered to death with pillows." Apparently Marozia hated him, which may "partly have been due to the fact that he had been her mother's lover." Marozia used her power to have her grandson installed as Pope John XII. Far from conforming to our modern image of the pope as a frail, elderly man, this twenty-something gave female pilgrims to Rome quite a different sort of papal audience, by raping them.

Roughly 200 years later, in 1159, the selection of a new pope was bitterly divided between Frederick I, Holy Roman Emperor and the Cardinals. After the Cardinals had chosen Cardinal Roland, and at the point in the investiture ceremony where he bent his head to receive the "scarlet mantle of the papacy ... Octavian [an imperial-partisan Cardinal] dived at him, snatched the mantle, and tried to don it himself." He lost it in a scuffle, but then, "his chaplain instantly produced another—presumably brought along for just such an eventuality—which Octavian this time managed to put on, unfortunately back to front, before anyone could stop him". After some further brouhaha, Octavian "made a dash for the papal throne, sat on it, and proclaimed himself Pope Victor IV." Although the imperial forces present at the time in Rome helped him maintain his claim for some months, they had to head back to Germany in the autumn before the Alpine passes would be blocked by snow, spelling the end for Pope Victor IV.

There is a chapter on Pope Joan, the woman who by legend, having kept her gender a secret was elected pope in 855, but became pregnant and gave delivery during a procession from Old St. Peter's Basilica to the Lateran, in a narrow lane. Norwich attributes this legend to a 1265 work by a "Polish-born Dominican monk named Martin" further stating that "[i]t is largely thanks to him that the legend of Pope Joan ... has become one of the hoariest canards in papal history." He writes regarding earlier authors referencing of Pope Joan that "though their histories were written earlier, all of the surviving copies comfortably postdate Martin." Noting that many references are mutually inconsistent, Norwich states "most of the rest echo Martin's words so closely as to leave no doubt that they are using him as their authority." The author further notes a letter from Pope Leo IX (term 1049–1054) to Michael I Cerularius, the Patriarch of Constantinople stating, "God forbid that we wish to believe [that] ... the Church of Constantinople ... once raised a woman onto the seat of its pontiff. We regard this crime as ... abominable and horrible ..." Norwich then asks, "[h]ad Leo ever heard of the existence of Pope Joan, is it likely that he would have laid himself open to the patriarch's obvious retort?"

Of Pope Innocent III (term 1198 – 1215) Norwich writes, "his complete confidence in himself — together with a sense of humor rare in the middle ages — made him patient, simple, and always approachable, genuinely loved by those around him."

Of Pope Alexander VI (term 1492–1503; AKA Rodrigo Borgia), Norwich asserts (also referencing Alexander's son Cesare Borgia), "[t]hanks to the two of them, and in lesser measure [daughter] Lucrezia, the Borgias have become a legend for villainy and cruelty." But there was another side. Speaking of the Church, Norwich asserts, "[t]o survive with its independence intact, it desperately needed adequate finance, firm administration, and astute diplomacy, and these Alexander was able to provide in full measure, however questionable his means of doing so." The author further notes, "[m]any of the accusations leveled against him could have been easily disproved, had he bothered to do so; by leaving them unanswered, he contributed to his own unspeakable reputation."

== Reception ==
New York Times reviewer Bill Keller states of Norwich, "He keeps things moving at nearly beach-read pace by being selective about where he lingers and by adopting the tone of an enthusiastic tour guide, expert but less than reverent." The reviewer noted that Norwich has little to say about the theology of the Popes, and treats their doctrinal disputes as a diplomatic matter.

Los Angeles Times reviewer Janet Kinosian writes of Norwich, "with his unstuffy and sometimes witty writing style, he walks us through what could otherwise be a stifling couple of thousand years of popes, antipopes, endless political power struggles, war, greed, torture, inquisitions, egomania, incest, fornication, bastard children and orgies."

== Publications ==
- UK Hardcover: Norwich, John Julius; (1 March 2011). The Popes, A History. United Kingdom: Chatto & Windus. ISBN 978-0701182908
- US Hardcover: Norwich, John Julius; (12 July 2011). Absolute Monarchs: A History of the Papacy United States: Random House. ISBN 978-1400067152
