= Aleda E. Lutz =

American army nurse (1915–1944)

- Lt. Aleda Ester Lutz
- Born: November 9, 1915; Freeland, Michigan, United States
- Died: November 1, 1944 (aged 28); Saint-Chamond, Loire, France
- Military career
- Allegiance: United States
- Branch: United States Army
- Rank: Lieutenant
- Nickname: Lutzy
- Unit: Army Nurse Corps
- Conflicts: World War II
- Awards: Distinguished Flying Cross; Air Medal (4); Purple Heart; European–African–Middle Eastern Campaign Medal; Red Cross Medal

Aleda Ester Lutz (November 9, 1915 – November 1, 1944) was a United States Army flight nurse. She was one of sixteen American servicewoman to be killed in combat during World War II, and the first military woman to receive the Distinguished Flying Cross, which she received posthumously. She is the second-highest decorated woman in the history of the U.S. military.

== Early life ==
Lutz in childhood

Lutz was born November 9, 1915, in Freeland, Michigan, to German immigrants Friederich Georg Lutz and Margaretha Sybilla (née Hitz) Lutz from Nuremberg, Germany. Lutz grew up bilingual, a native English and German speaker, which would later make her an asset during World War II.

Lutz was the youngest of 10 children and grew up on a farm. During World War I when she was an infant, most of the Lutz family was forced to register as German and report to county court. This was a time in which many Americans were angry and suspicious towards German-Americans, and during the course of the war the government registered nearly half a million "enemy alien" civilians.

Lutz attended Wellman Country School through the 8th grade and Freeland School through the 10th grade. In 1933 she graduated from Saginaw Arthur Hill High School. In 1937 Lutz graduated from Saginaw General Hospital School of Nursing.

Lutz was a superior athlete; she especially liked tennis, dancing, and ice skating. She began bowling while attending nursing school, and became an avid bowler. As an activity for the nursing students, a local bowling center, Hessie Lanes, gave the students the opportunity to bowl at a reduced rate. Lutz was active in the Saginaw Women's Bowling Association, which was founded in 1937.

Lutz was not alone in her military service to her country: her brother Adam fought in WWI, her brother Conrad joined the medical division during WWII, her nephews Theodore and Frederick joined the U.S. Army during WWII and her nephew Robert joined the peace-keeping force in Germany after WWII.

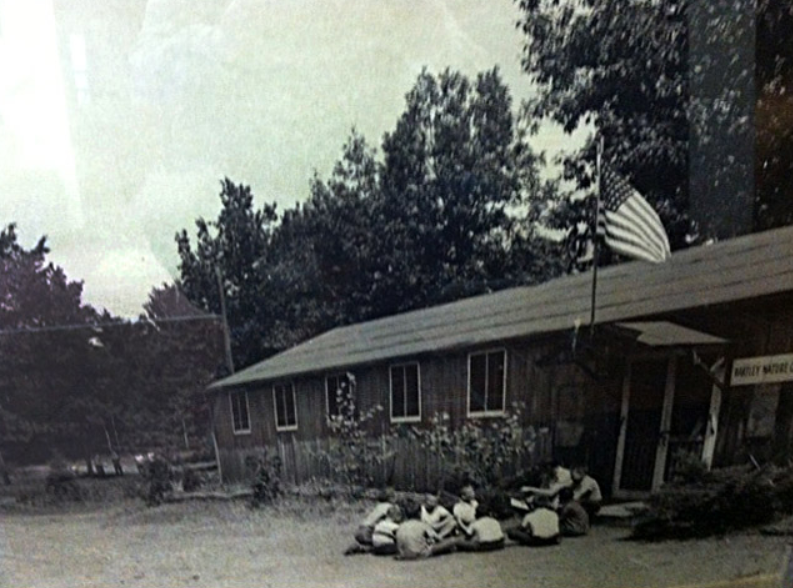
Freeland POW Camp on the former Lutz farm

During WWII, the Lutz farm became the Freeland POW Camp. The Lutz family belonged to St. John Lutheran Church-Amelith and helped minister to the German POWs who were housed at the Freeland POW Camp. Runways were laid to turn the camp into Tri-City Airport, later MBS International Airport.

== World War II ==
Lutz became a staff nurse at Saginaw General Hospital, but with the advent of World War II, she began looking for a way to contribute to the massive war effort. She enlisted in the Army Nurse Corps on February 10, 1942, and was commissioned a 2nd lieutenant. Her army service number was N730648.

Lutz spent her early months as a general duty nurse in the Station Hospital at Selfridge Field, in Mount Clemens, Michigan. Early letters describe her living quarters, her work at the base, and her thoughts about the service. In one letter she said she was the only nurse on duty and had 25 patients. Furthermore, she expected the work load to increase as more nurses were being sent overseas.

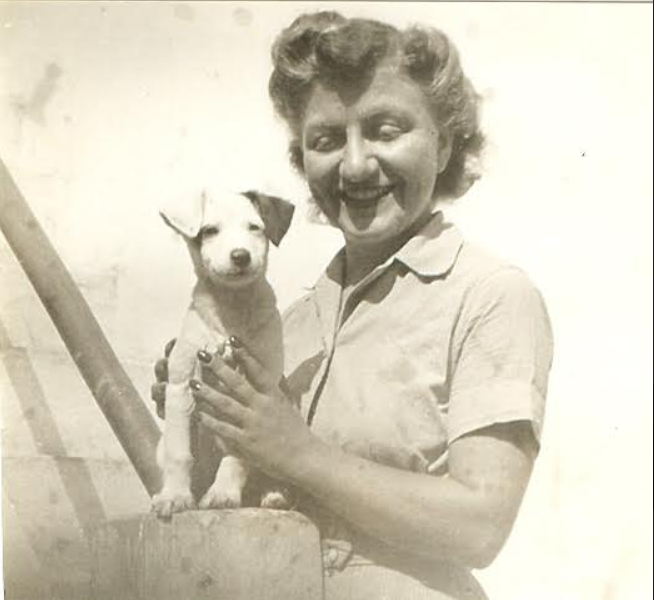
Lutz with a small dog

All nurses in at Selfridge Field were asked to volunteer for duty as an Air Evacuation Nurse if they could pass the pilot's physical. Only two percent of 59,000 nurses in World War II were qualified flight nurses. World War II had given rise to the first female flight nurses in the U.S. military. Just 6 of 22 nurses who applied passed the physical. Three of the six dropped out of the program. Only Lutz and two others, Clara Murphy and Veronica Savinski, were assigned to be flight nurses.

On December 17, 1943, Lutz was promoted to 1st Lieutenant. Lutz was transferred to the 802nd Medical Air Evacuation Squadron of the United States Armys 12th Air Force, the first to depart for overseas duty. They were activated and sent to North Africa. The 802nd was a Medical Air Evacuation Squadron, the first unit of its kind. This highly classified unit consisted of C-47 cargo planes which flew to the battlefront with ammunition and supplies and then took wounded-emergency cases back to the hospitals. These planes flew without the Red Cross insignia. She was first sent to Sarasota's Morrison Field in Florida. She and the other nurses were looking forward to spending the winter in the sunny south, but before their curriculum was in place, the unit was activated. In January 1943, the three nurses were en route to an overseas assignment as part of the evacuation squadron sent into active duty. It appears that they received their training on the job, in the middle of a war zone.

Lt. Aleda E. Lutz

Lutz was in the 1st landing in Africa and on every American operation that went on around there. Lutz participated in six separate battle campaigns over a 20-month period, accompanied air combat missions, and conducted all-weather medical evacuations in Tunisia, Italy and France.

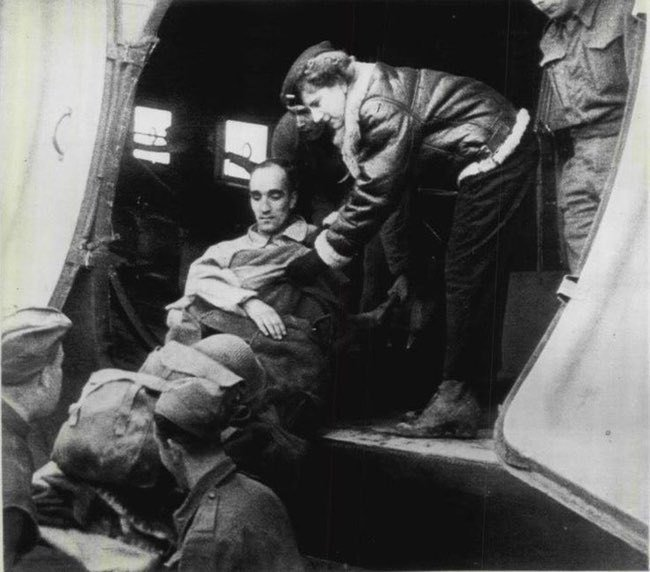
Lutz helping patients off an airplane.

As a flight nurse, Lutz flew in unmarked transport planes, which were used to carry supplies to front lines and transport patients back out, making them legal targets for enemy fire. She once made four sorties in a single day onto the Anzio beachhead flight-strip while it was still under shell fire from the German army.

On November 1, 1944, she was fatally injured in a Medevac C-47 crash near Saint-Chamond, Loire, France. The Medevac was transporting 15 wounded soldiers (6 German POW and 9 American soldiers) from Lyon, France, to a hospital in Italy when the plane crashed. The official explanation was that a violent storm was encountered. The pilot lost control of the plane and it crashed on the side of Mont Pilat (Crest de la Perdrix) in Massif central, at the south of Saint-Etienne and Lyon. There were no survivors. Lutz was 28 years old, and the only female on the plane.

Lutz was one of only 16 American military females to die in combat in World War II. At the time of her death, Lutz was perhaps the most experienced flight nurse in the U.S. military service. She had the most evacuation sorties (196), most combat hours flown by any flight nurse (814) and the most patients transported by any flight nurse (3500+).

Lutz was buried with full military honors in the Rhone American Cemetery and Memorial in Draguignan, France. General Mark W. Clark and Major General Thomas B. Larkin both attended her funeral. Lutz is the only woman buried there.

== Honors and legacy ==
Lutz is one of the most highly decorated women in the United States Military. Lutz was awarded the Purple Heart, the Air Medal with four Oak Leaf Clusters, the European–African–Middle Eastern Campaign Medal, and the Red Cross Medal. Lutz earned six battle stars: Tunisia, Sicily, Rome-Arno, Southern France, and North Apennines.

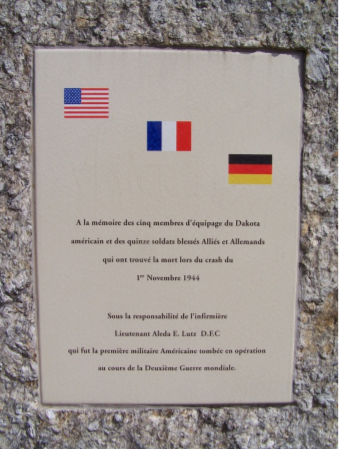
Stele near Doizieux France

On December 28, 1944 Lutz became the first military woman to receive the Distinguished Flying Cross, which she received posthumously from President Franklin D. Roosevelt. Lutz was the second woman to receive the decoration (after Amelia Earhart), awarded for distinguished performance in an aerial flight. It reads as follows:

For extraordinary achievement—throughout her long period of service, 1st Lt. Lutz distinguished herself through superior professional skill and courage. Her selfless devotion to duty and outstanding proficiency have reflected the highest credit upon herself and the armed forces of the United States. Her resourcefulness and determination have been on high inspiration those serving with her.

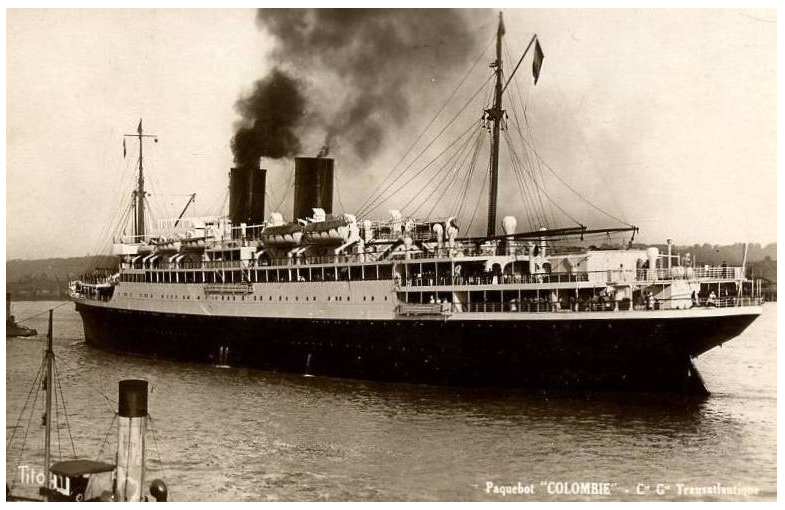
USAHS Aleda E. Lutz

On April 3, 1945, at the insistence of General George C. Marshall, Lutz was honored with an 800-patient future hospital ship, USAHS Aleda E. Lutz, the former French liner Colombie and largest mercy ship afloat at the time. On February 13, 1945, Aleda E. Lutz was designated a U.S. Army hospital ship in accordance to international practice, as set forth in the provisions of the Hague Conventions of 1899 and 1907.

The Aleda E. Lutz Nursing Award was given annually by the Saginaw General Hospital's Nursing School from 1945 until its closing in 1969.

When women war veterans of Saginaw County organized their own American Legion Post No.544 after the war, it was also named for Lutz.

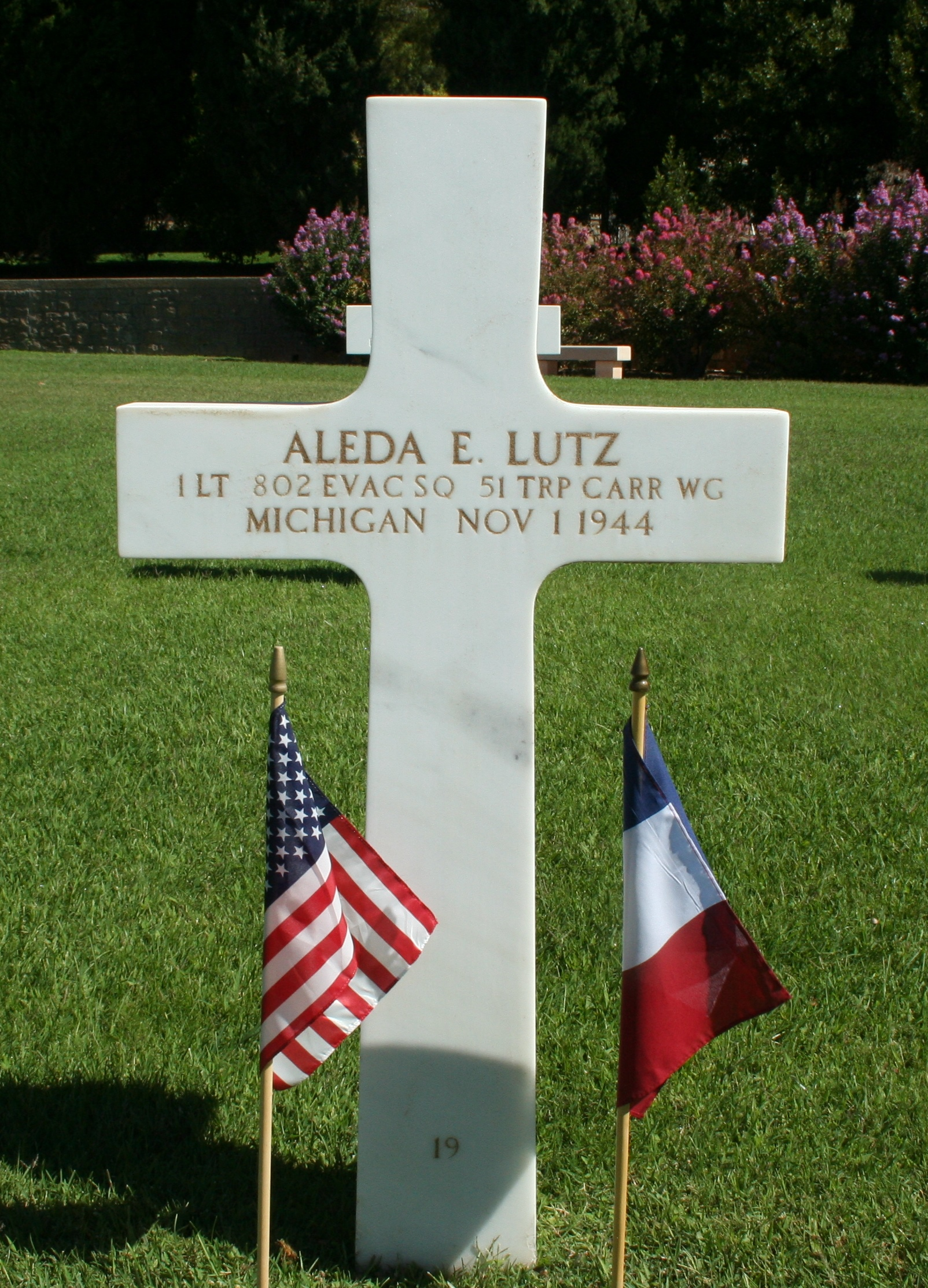
Grave of Lt. Aleda E. Lutz (Rhone American Cemetery and Memorial)

In July 1945, Lutz's sister Hilda, a Saginaw General Hospital nurse, was a special guest at the Detroit Municipal Airport where the U.S. Army Air Forces were presented with an $80,000 check from the Women's International Bowling Congress for a new C-47 airplane to be named Miss Nightingale III, in Lutz's honor.

To carry on her legacy, her family and members of the Women's International Bowling Congress joined together to lobby Congress to pass a bill that allowed medical hospitals to be named in honor of women. The effort to rename the facility after Lutz, who was an athlete in bowling and half a dozen other sports, continued to be recognized by women bowlers. They responded to a request at the 1990 WIBC's annual meeting to stir up national support for renaming the center. The vast majority of Saginaw citizens thought the hospital was already named after Lutz—after all, it was dedicated in her honor in 1950 and again in 1988—but it had not been officially recognized by Congress. In fact, the congressional resolution was first offered in 1949, but died in committee because she was a woman. WIBC delegates spread the word that legislation needed to be approved by Congress before the center could officially be named after Lutz. By writing letters and telephoning congressional leaders, they made it happen.

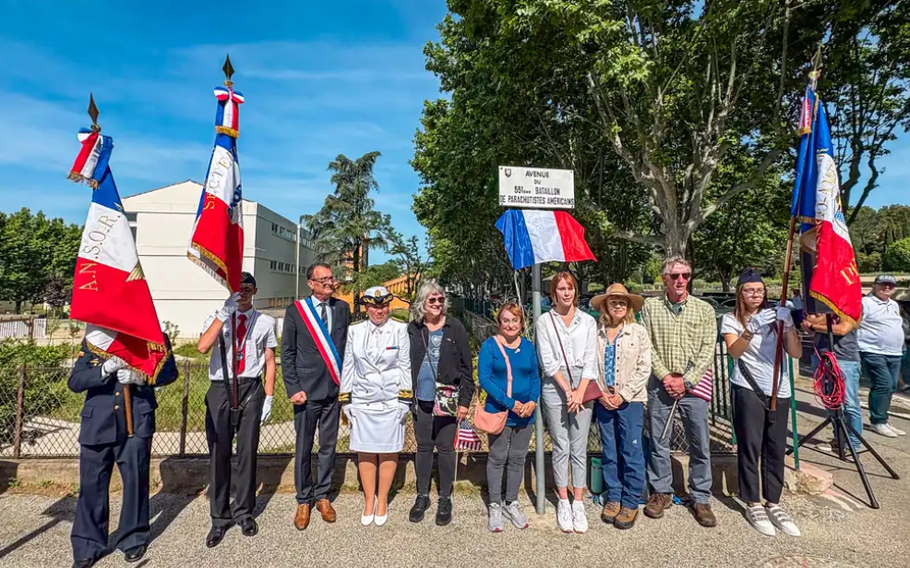
Members of Aleda Lutz's family, French officials and other participants gather at the 2025 dedication of Rue Aleda Lutz in Draguignan, France.

On October 27, 1990, the Aleda E. Lutz Veterans Affairs Medical Center was rededicated as the Aleda E. Lutz Department of Veterans Affairs Medical Center, by Congressional decree. It was the first time a medical facility was congressionally named after a woman. The dedication came 46 years after Aleda's death.

In 1993, Lutz was inducted into the Saginaw Hall of Fame, and in 1994 she was inducted into the Michigan Women's Hall of Fame in Lansing.

On April 17, 2010, Lutz, along with four other former military members with Michigan connections, was enshrined into the Air Zoo's Michigan Aviation Hall of Fame.

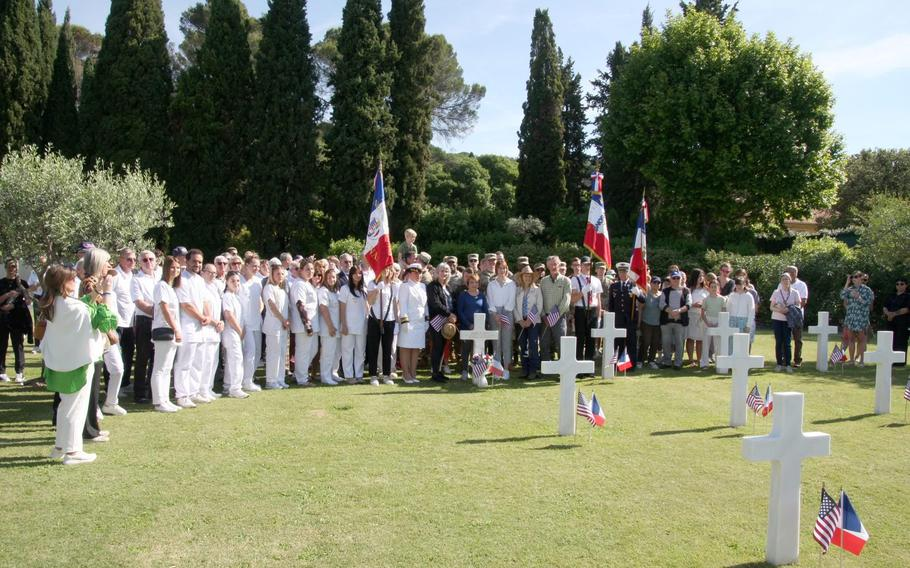
Participants, including members of Aleda Lutz's family, gather at the Rhône American Cemetery in Draguignan, France, during a 2025 ceremony honoring U.S. Army flight nurse and pilot Aleda Lutz.

A stele (monument) exists at the crash site which states Lutz was the first American woman who died in action during World War II. This claim is incorrect however, as many American servicewomen died in World War II combat actions before Lutz. The stele is near Doizieux, France, on Mont Pilat. The monument was erected in 2005, and every September there is a memorial service. A local citizen has written a book about the crash and has interviewed all the witnesses.

These honors, earned during her lifetime and posthumously, make Lutz the second-highest decorated woman in the US military, after Civil War Doctor Mary Edwards Walker, the sole female recipient of the Medal of Honor.

In 2025, family members of Aleda E. Lutz traveled to France to take part in a series of ceremonies honoring her sacrifice and enduring legacy. Local officials, military representatives, historians, and community members gathered in remembrance of the decorated American flight nurse who lost her life during World War II while evacuating wounded soldiers from the front lines. The ceremonies were made possible in part through the support and coordination of Le Souvenir Franco-Américain, an organization dedicated to preserving the memory of American service members who fought for the liberation of France.
