= SS Colombie =

French merchant ship later converted hospital ship

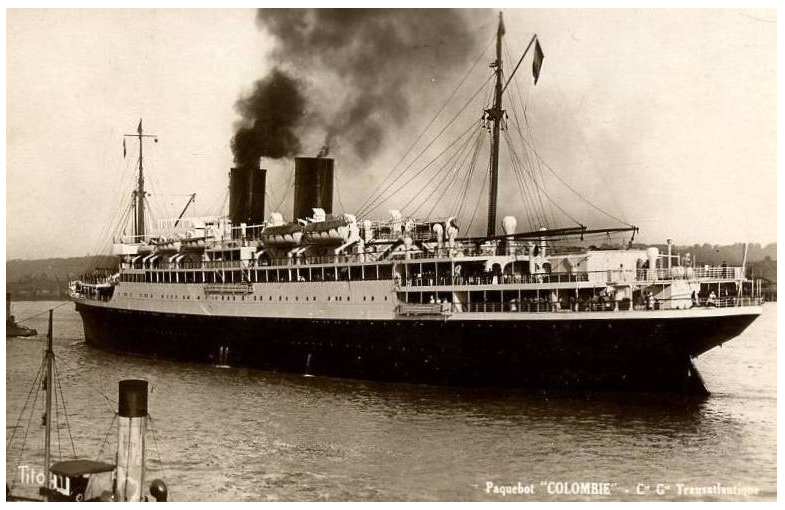
- SS Colombie as a merchant ship in 1930s.

History

France
- Name: SS Colombie
- Namesake: Colombie
- Owner: (1931-1940): Compagnie Générale Transatlantique; (1937-1941): French Navy
- Builder: Ateliers et Chantiers de France, Dunkirk
- Laid down: 1931
- Launched: 18 July 1931
- Identification: Pennant number: X10
- Fate: Confiscated by United States in 1942

United States
- Name: (1943-1945): SS Colombie; (1945-1946): USAHS Aleda E. Lutz
- Namesake: Colombie; Aleda E. Lutz
- Owner: (1943-1945): War Shipping Administration; (1945-1946): United States Army
- Fate: Transferred back to France in 1946

France
- Name: (1946-1964): SS Colombie; (1964-1968): SS Atlantica
- Namesake: Colombie; Atlantica
- Owner: (1946-1964): Compagnie Générale Transatlantique; (1964-1968): Typaldos Lines
- Fate: Scrapped in 1974

General characteristics
- Type: Merchant ship; Hospital ship; Troopship
- Displacement: 12,348 tons (Saturnia)
- Length: 158.49 m (520 ft 0 in)
- Beam: 20.2 m (66 ft 3 in)
- Draft: 8.1 m (26 ft 7 in)
- Depth: 17.1 m (56 ft 1 in)
- Installed power: 2x Steam turbines; 2x shafts
- Speed: 16 knots (30 km/h)
- Boats & landing craft carried: 10 x Lifeboats; 8 x Liferafts
- Complement: 491 passengers; 828 patients

SS Colombie was a French merchant ship and later converted to a hospital ship. She was named after Colombie.

== Construction and career ==
Colombie was laid down, launched and commissioned in 1931 for Compagnie Générale Transatlantique (French Line). She was built by Ateliers et Chantiers de France, Dunkirk.

Lieutenant Aleda E. Lutz

Throughout the 1930s she serve as a merchant ship until 1940 where she was converted to an armed merchant ship till 1941. In December 1942, Colombie was taken over by US Army at Casablanca, Morocco and sent to New York to be converted to a troopship during 1943 by Arthur Tickle Engineering Company. She was still under jurisdiction of War Shipping Administration, with French Line.

She operated between the east coast of the United States and the Europe-Africa-Middle East theaters of operations. The ship was acquired by the US Army Transportation Service for conversion to a hospital ship by Arthur Tickle Engineering Works in Brooklyn, New York, between January and April 1945.

She was recommissioned as USAHS Aleda E. Lutz on 13 February 1945. Named after Lt. Aleda E. Lutz, a women war hero of World War II. Lutz was the first American woman to die in combat during World War II and the highest decorated woman in the history of the US military. The ship moored pierside at Pearl Harbor from 21 to 24 November 1945.

USAHS Aleda E. Lutz was decommissioned on 6 April 1946 and transferred to the War Shipping Administration but five days later returned to French Line. Colombie was modernized and returned to commercial service on the Havre-West Indies route. On 1 January 1954, a British politician and writer, Duff Cooper, Viscount Norwich, died aboard her.

Colombie was sold to Typaldos Lines in 1964 and renamed Atlantica. Later, following the 1966 sinking of the ferry Heraklion and the convictions for manslaughter, negligence, and document falsification, Typaldos Lines was declared bankrupt and Atlantica was abandoned, then sold for scrapping in 1974.

== See also ==
- Hospital ship
- French Line
- Aleda E. Lutz
