= Byzantium: The Early Centuries =

Book by John Julius Norwich

- Cover Art, Showing Ravenna Mosaic of Justinian I
- Author: John Julius Norwich
- Language: English
- Genre: Non-fiction
- Publisher: Viking Press
- Publication date: 1989

Byzantium: The Early Centuries (1989) is a popular history book written by English historian John Julius Norwich, published by Viking.

== Content ==
In the book, Norwich covers the years 286-802 AD, from the establishment of the Tetrarchy by Diocletian and the beginning of the Dominate in the Roman Empire to the coronation of Charlemagne and the deposition of the Empress Irene of Athens, generally proceeding chronologically, and commenting on the social and religious forces and conflicts as he continues.

Norwich progresses through the demise of the tetrarchic system and the rise of Constantine the Great as sole emperor, the foundation of Constantinople at the site of ancient Byzantium and the declaration of Christianity as state religion and the failure of Julian the Apostate's pagan reaction. Norwich then describes the time when the empire was split into two entities, one in the west and one in the east, which became known as the Byzantine Empire. Norwich narrates the fall of the western empire and the era of Justinian I, the wars with the Persians under Heraclius, the beginning of the Muslim conquests and the eastern empire's fight for survival in the 7th century. The reaction to Byzantine Iconoclasm and the fall of the Isaurian dynasty lead to the ascension of Irene of Athens, and in turn to the coronation of the Frankish king Charlemagne as emperor in Christmas 800 in Rome by the Pope. Norwich picks this event, that marks the end of the Byzantines' sole claim to imperial status and the unquestioned acceptance by the West of the emperor at Constantinople as sole head of all Christendom, as the decisive moment which defines the conclusion of the early Byzantine era.

For close questions, Norwich discusses the primary sources, and where they disagree or agree as the case may be. For example, regarding the miraculous appearance of a cross in the sky at the Battle of the Milvian Bridge, Norwich notes that the earliest writings do not mention this and only the latest writing by a contemporaneous source discloses the putative event. Furthermore, he infers the emotions of the principal players and renders judgment on most of the Byzantine Emperors and some others. Concerning Justinian I, he asserts his death "was not deeply mourned", noting that "the tyranny of his tax-gatherers had caused serious discontent ... ." But he also avers that Justinian had left the Empire, "infinitely richer in amenities, services and public works, and incomparably more beautiful." In the epilogue, Norwich also asserts that of all the Eastern Roman emperors, Constantine I, Justinian I, Heraclius, Basil I, Basil II and Alexios Komnenos "possessed true greatness", while Phocas, Michael III, Zoe and the Angeloi were "contemptible".

Norwich also comments on historical issues. In discussing the appearance of iconoclasm, after noting a belief by many that it was engendered by Islamic influence, he asserts it was, "an obvious corollary to the monophysite belief: if we accept only the divine nature of Christ — which is by nature impossible to depict — and reject the human, we cannot logically approve of a 2- or 3- dimensional portrayal of him as a human being."

Every chapter is introduced with a contemporaneous quote. For example, Chapter 7 "Of Heresies and Huns" [410-53] begins with this cultural comment from St. Gregory of Nyssa: "If you ask a man for change, he will give you a piece of philosophy about the Begotten and the Unbegotten; if you enquire the price of a loaf, he replies: 'The Father is greater and the Son inferior'; or if you ask whether the bath is ready, the answer you receive is that the Son was made out of nothing."

== Reviews ==
"The reader is conveyed in comfort, as it were in a very superior hovercraft, which glides smoothly over all the unevenness of the ground, to the regular, melodious sound of the author's prose." (Sunday Times)

"He is brilliant... He writes like the most cultivated modern diplomat, attached by a freak of time to the Byzantine court, with intimate knowledge, tactful judgement and a consciousness of the surviving monuments." (The Independent)

The book received a mediocre review from The New York Times. Norwich's writing was described as "plummy" and the historical detail he brings to the era is praised, but the reviewer thought at times the narrative was distant and the descriptions overly ornate. The book became a New York Times bestseller.
