= Shakespeare's Kings =

1999 book by John Julius Norwich

Shakespeare's Kings: The Great Plays and the History of England in the Middle Ages: 1337–1485
- Author: John Julius Norwich
- Language: English
- Genre: Non-fiction
- Publisher: Penguin Group
- Publication date: 1999
- ISBN: 978-0-7432-0031-8

Shakespeare's Kings: The Great Plays and the History of England in the Middle Ages: 1337–1485 (1999) ISBN 978-0-7432-0031-8 is a non-fiction book by John Julius Norwich. Lord Norwich was a British historian, author, and peer. The book was published by Penguin Group in Great Britain. The intent of the book was to provide historical context behind nine of Shakespeare's histories, allowing for the fact that, as an artist, Shakespeare's purpose was dramatic impact more than absolute historical accuracy. The nine plays span a period of approximately 150 years of British history. Norwich seeks to address the real people and real events behind the histories and identify, as much as possible, where the plays and the facts coincide and where they may differ. He addresses the plays in chronological order, while Shakespeare composed them in a much more random sequence. Norwich's book covers the history relating to the following plays:

1. Edward III
2. Richard II
3. Henry IV, Part 1
4. Henry IV, Part 2
5. Henry V
6. Henry VI, Part 1
7. Henry VI, Part 2
8. Henry VI, Part 3
9. Richard III

The play concerning Edward III is believed by some scholars to be authored by Shakespeare, but it has not historically been included in the Shakespeare canon.

== See also ==
- Asimov's Guide to Shakespeare

G
