= Alice Hart-Davis =

British journalist

Alice Hart-Davis (born 1963) is a British journalist, author and founder of thetweakmentsguide.com.

== Early life ==
Born in Builth Wells, the daughter of the biographer and journalist Duff Hart-Davis, and a granddaughter of publisher and biographer Rupert Hart-Davis, Alice Hart-Davis was brought up in Henley-on-Thames and educated at Headington School before reading history at St Edmund Hall, Oxford. She is also a niece of the broadcaster Adam Hart-Davis.

== Career ==
After Oxford, Alice worked at The Sunday Telegraph's Sunday Magazine, The Daily Telegraph, the Mail on Sunday and the London Evening Standard, and now contributes as a freelance basis to many newspapers and magazines, specialising in cosmetic procedures, beauty and health. She has written many articles about anti-aging treatments and has frankly documented her own experiences in trying non-surgical cosmetic procedures such as Botox. She has also written extensively about skincare.

Hart-Davis has won several awards, including the CEW (UK) Achiever Award in 2012, P&G beauty: Best Beauty Journalist of a monthly consumer glossy in 2010, and the Johnson & Johnson Beauty Journalist of the Year, 2008. Hart-Davis is herself on the judging panel for several beauty industry awards (British Hairdresser of the Year, British Spa & Beauty Awards and the Smile (Dentistry) Awards).

She has also written guides to beauty for teenagers with both of her daughters. The first, co-authored with Molly Hindhaugh, is entitled Be Beautiful: Every Girl's Guide to Hair, Skin and Make-up (Walker Books 2009;ISBN 978-1-4063-1831-9) and the second, with Beth Hindhaugh, 100 Ways for Every Girl to Look and Feel Fantastic (Walker Books 2012;ISBN 978-1406337549). In 2019, she published the book The Tweakments Guide: Fresher Face (Silverwood Books 2019;ISBN 978-1999359607) a guide to non-surgical cosmetic procedures and launched an accompanying website thetweakmentsguide.com.

== Personal life ==
She lives in Bayswater, London, is married and has three children.
