= Ronald Egerton Balfour =

British illustrator (1896–1941)

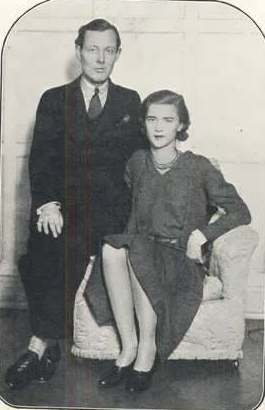
- Balfour and Deirdre Hart-Davis (1929)
- Born: 6 August 1896; Lanarkshire
- Died: 16 April 1941 (aged 44); United Kingdom
- Occupation: Illustrator
- Known for: Illustrating Rubaiyat (1920)

Ronald Egerton Balfour (1896–1941) or professionally as Ronald Balfour was a British Illustrator and costume designer, best remembered for being the husband of Deirdre Hart-Davis and his Beardsleyesque depiction of the well known Rubaiyat of Omar Khayyam published in 1920.

== Biography ==
Balfour was born at Hamilton, Lanarkshire in Scotland to the wealthy Anglo-Indian Balfour family, the son of Brigadier–General Sir Alfred Granville Balfour (1858-1936) and Agnes Frances Elizabeth Balfour (d.1936). His cousin was also Arthur Balfour, Prime Minister of the United Kingdom between 1902 and 1905. By 1901, the Balfour family resided in Westminster and from 1914 on, in Chelsea. By 1915, Balfour joined the Royal Navy as a midshipman returning in 1919 to the family home in Chelsea.

Balfour appears to have begun sketching during his time in the Navy between 1916 and 1919. Balfour began his career as a commercial artist after the Great War as a costumer designer publishing his work in the likes of Tatler Magazine. By 1921 with the well received publication of his Rubaiyat, Balfour opened his own studio. Balfour also became involved as a Manager in Standard Oil. In 1930, he married the socialite and 'Bright Young Thing' Deirdre Phyllis Ulrica Hart–Davis with whom he had two daughters, Susan (b.1931) and Annabel (b.1935). After 1934 he also worked in the film industry as a costume designer, making sketches for Anna May Wongs costume in the Java Head. Balfour was also known to design his wife's dresses as well. Balfour would die on 16 April 1941 in a car crash on the way to his country house, by way of Kingston Bypass, due to falling asleep at the wheel.

== Illustrated works ==
- Rubaiyat of Omar Khayyam Constable & Co (1920, 1922, 1930)
- Christopher Marlowe Ernest Milton, Constable & Co (1924)
- Thin air: A Himalayan Interlude Constance Bridges, Brewer & Warren Inc (1930)

== Reprinted material ==
- The Rubaiyat MAAR-sha (2005)
