= A History of Venice =

1982 book by John Julius Norwich

- Author: John Julius Norwich
- Language: English
- Genre: Non-fiction
- Publisher: Vintage Books
- Publication date: 1982
- Publication place: United States

A History of Venice is a 1982 book by the English popular historian John Julius Norwich (1929–2018) published in the United States by Vintage Books. It is an omnibus edition of two books previously published in Britain:

- Venice: The Rise to Empire, Allen Lane (1977).
- Venice: The Greatness and Fall, Allen Lane (1981).

Norwich had also previously published two volumes on the Normans in southern Italy (1967–70) and subsequently produced a three-volume history of the Byzantine Empire (1988–95). There is a fair amount of overlap between these subjects, with the Normans and Byzantine figures appearing in Venetian history. The Venetians, in turn, were important players in the sacking of Constantinople in the fourth crusade, and carrying off booty which was used to decorate St. Mark's Cathedral.

== Synopsis ==
This is a History of Venice, starting with frightened refugees from the barbarian invasions of Italy settling in a marshy lagoon, and continuing through the establishment of republican government and the building of a trading empire encompassing the Dalmatian Coast, Mediterranean Islands and parts of the Po Valley. Then, with the Portuguese establishing a more direct trade route to the originating locations of valued Asian goods, it continues with the reinvention of the city into a publishing, intellectual, and finally a pleasure center. It ends with the Napoleonic invasion, bringing an end to the thousand year old, Serenissima Repubblica (Most Serene Republic).

Norwich covers the facts, provides emotions and motivations, occasionally discusses the primary sources and provides a great deal of commentary. For example, after noting the establishment of the Arsenal (the shipyard of Venice) and the beginnings of making separate war ships and trading ships, Norwich comments, "[o]ne of the secrets of Venice's rise to power lay in the fact that she never saw the twin necessities of defence and commerce as altogether separate." Further noting that Venetian war captains were "never averse to trading on the side" resulting in military expeditions sometimes paying for themselves. At the same time, trading ships were always ready to fight.

Concerning The fourth Crusade, Norwich remarks, "[p]olitically too, the damage done was incalculable." Further noting that the eventually reformed Greek Empire "was to struggle on for nearly two more centuries" but "never recovered its strength ... ."

Concerning the Rialto Bridge, Norwich notes that a competition had been held for its design, one of the entrants being Michelangelo. Due to the sudden necessity of repairing the Doge's Palace after fire damage, however, none of the entrants was picked and the job eventually was given to Antonio da Ponte. Norwich comments, "[a]s a work of art, we must frankly admit, the bridge lacks distinction ... Its very familiarity blinds us to its faults — the poor proportions, the curious air of topheaviness, the coarseness of the detail." He further states that in the rare moments when it is seen for its mediocracy, that "it is difficult, at such times, not to feel a quick stab of regret for the masterpiece that Venice might have had, if genius had been allowed its way."

== Reception ==
The New York Times reviewer Luigi Barzini opined: "Viscount Norwich has written a living book, which will surely last a long time in print – a book full of blood, naval battles, sieges, adventures, conquests, strokes of luck, stupendous defeats, glorious victories, secret plots, counterplots and astute diplomatic negotiations, together with sharp profiles of the protagonists, whether heroes or villains."

Kirkus Reviews wrote, "What you will find ... is chattily readable prose, a dry sense of humor ("Eunuchs, as everybody knows, are dangerous people to cross"), and the author's engagingly qualified admiration for the Venetians—their unflagging self-interest, their state-imposed discipline, their secular, non-intellectual activism, their flexible ability to live more or less under a constitution for centuries."
