= John Julius Norwich =

British historian (1929–2018)

The Right Honourable The Viscount Norwich CVO
- Norwich in 1966
- Born: John Julius Cooper; 15 September 1929; London, England
- Died: 1 June 2018 (aged 88); London, England
- Education: Upper Canada College; Eton College; University of Strasbourg; New College, Oxford
- Occupations: Historian; travel writer; television personality
- Spouse(s): Anne Clifford (m. 1952; div. 1983) Hon. Mary Makins Philipps (m. 1989)
- Children: Artemis Cooper; Hon. Jason Cooper; Allegra Huston
- Parents: Duff Cooper (father); Lady Diana Manners (mother)
- Writing career
- Pen name: John Julius Norwich

Member of the House of Lords
- In office 1 January 1954 – 11 November 1999; Hereditary peerage
- Preceded by: The 1st Viscount Norwich
- Succeeded by: House of Lords Act 1999

John Julius Cooper, 2nd Viscount Norwich, CVO (15 September 1929 – 1 June 2018), also known as John Julius Norwich, was an English popular historian, writer of widely read travel books, and television personality.

Cooper was born in London in 1929, the son of the Conservative politician and diplomat Duff Cooper and the actress Diana Manners. He joined the British Foreign Service in 1952, serving in Yugoslavia and Lebanon and as a member of the British delegation to the Disarmament Conference in Geneva. On his father's death in 1954, he became the second Viscount Norwich. In 1964, Norwich left the diplomatic service to become a writer.

His books included histories of Sicily under the Normans (1967, 1970), Venice (1977, 1981), the Byzantine Empire (1988, 1992, 1995), the Mediterranean (2006) and the Papacy (2011). He also served as an editor of series such as Great Architecture of the World, The Italian World, The New Shell Guides to Great Britain, The Oxford Illustrated Encyclopaedia of Art and the Duff Cooper Diaries.

Norwich also worked extensively in radio and television. He was the host of the BBC radio panel game My Word! for four years (1978–82) and was also a regional contestant on Round Britain Quiz. He wrote and presented about 30 television documentaries, including The Fall of Constantinople, Napoleon's Hundred Days, Cortés and Montezuma, The Antiquities of Turkey, The Gates of Asia, Maximilian of Mexico, Toussaint l'Ouverture of Haiti, The Knights of Malta, Treasure Houses of Britain, and The Death of the Prince Imperial in the Zulu War.

== Biography ==
=== Youth ===
Norwich was born John Julius Cooper on 15 September 1929 at the Alfred House Nursing Home on Portland Place in Marylebone, London. He was the son of the Conservative politician and diplomat Duff Cooper, later Viscount Norwich, and Lady Diana Manners, a celebrated beauty and society figure. He was given the name "Julius" in part because he was born by caesarean section. His mother's fame as an actress and beauty attracted a crowd outside the nursing home and hundreds of letters of congratulations. Through his father, he was descended from King William IV and his mistress Dorothea Jordan.

Cooper was educated at Egerton House School in Dorset Square, London, later becoming a boarder when the school was evacuated to Northamptonshire before the Second World War. Because his father, as Minister of Information, was high on the Nazi enemies list of British politicians, Cooper's parents feared for his safety in the event of a German invasion. In 1940, they decided to send him away after the US ambassador to Britain, Joseph P. Kennedy, offered to take him to the United States with other evacuee children on board the SS Washington. Cooper attended Upper Canada College in Toronto, Canada, and spent his holidays with the family of William S. Paley on Long Island, New York. In 1942, he returned to Britain, where he attended Eton College. After the war, he studied at the University of Strasbourg while his father was ambassador to France. Cooper completed his national service in the Royal Navy before taking a degree in French and Russian at New College, Oxford.

=== Career ===
After Oxford, Cooper joined the British Foreign Service. He served in Yugoslavia and Lebanon and as a member of the British delegation to the Disarmament Conference in Geneva. On his father's death in 1954, he inherited the title of Viscount Norwich, created for Duff Cooper in 1952. This gave him a right to sit in the House of Lords, which he lost with the House of Lords Act 1999.

In 1964, Norwich left the diplomatic service to become a writer. His books included histories of Sicily under the Normans (1967, 1970), Venice (1977, 1981), the Byzantine Empire (1988, 1992, 1995), the Mediterranean (2006), and the Papacy (2011), amongst others. He also served as editor of series such as Great Architecture of the World, The Italian World, The New Shell Guides to Great Britain, The Oxford Illustrated Encyclopaedia of Art, and the Duff Cooper Diaries.

Norwich worked extensively in radio and television. He was host of the BBC radio panel game My Word! for four years (1978–82) and was a regional contestant on Round Britain Quiz. He wrote and presented about 30 television documentaries, including The Fall of Constantinople, Napoleon's Hundred Days, Cortés and Montezuma, The Antiquities of Turkey, The Gates of Asia, Maximilian of Mexico, Toussaint l'Ouverture of Haiti, The Knights of Malta, Treasure Houses of Britain, and The Death of the Prince Imperial in the Zulu War.

Norwich also worked for various charitable projects. He was the chairman of the Venice in Peril Fund, honorary chairman of the World Monuments Fund, a member of the General Committee of Save Venice, and a vice-president of the National Association of Decorative and Fine Arts Societies. He served for many years on the Executive Committee of the National Trust and also served on the board of the English National Opera. Norwich was also a patron of SHARE Community, which provides vocational training to disabled people.

==== Christmas Crackers ====
Norwich compiled Christmas Crackers from whatever attracted him: letters, diaries, gravestones, poems, boastful Who's Who entries, indexes from biographies, and word games such as palindromes, holorhymes and mnemonics. He sometimes included untranslated Greek, French, Latin or German, as well as oddities such as a review from Field and Stream concerning the republication of Lady Chatterley's Lover.

His final Christmas Cracker was the 49th. It was put together during the early part of 2018 and corrected the final proofs from his hospital bed before he died.

=== Personal life and death ===
Norwich's first wife was Anne Frances May Clifford, daughter of the Hon. Sir Bede Clifford. They had one daughter, the Hon. Artemis Cooper, a historian, and a son, the Hon. Jason Charles Duff Bede Cooper, an architect. After their divorce, Norwich married his second wife, the Hon. Mary (Makins) Philipps, daughter of The 1st Baron Sherfield.

Norwich was also the father of Allegra Huston, born of his affair with the American ballet dancer Enrica Soma while she was married to the American film director John Huston.

Norwich lived for much of his life in a large detached Victorian house in Warwick Avenue in Little Venice, Maida Vale, London, close to Regent's Canal. He later downsized to a flat in nearby Bayswater.

Norwich died of heart failure on 1 June 2018, aged 88.

== Titles, styles, honours and arms ==
- 1929–1952: John Julius Cooper
- 1952–1954: The Honourable John Julius Cooper
- 1954–2018: The Right Honourable The Viscount Norwich

Norwich was appointed to the Royal Victorian Order as a Commander in 1992 by Elizabeth II, as part of the celebrations to mark the 40th anniversary of her accession.

Coat of arms of John Julius Norwich
Crest On the Battlements of a Tower Argent a Bull passant Sable armed and unguled Or Escutcheon Or three Lions rampant Gules on a Chief Azure a Portcullis chained between two Fleurs-de-lis of the first Supporters On either side a Unicorn Argent gorged with a Collar with Chain reflexed over the back Or pendent from the collar of the dexter a Portcullis chained and from that of the sinister a Fleur-de-lys both Gold Motto Odi Et Amo (I hate and I love) Orders Royal Victorian Order (not pictured)

== Works ==
- Mount Athos (jointly with Reresby Sitwell), Hutchinson, 1966
- The Normans in the South, 1016–1130, Longman, 1967. Also published by Harper & Row with the title The Other Conquest
- Sahara, Longman, 1968
- The Kingdom in the Sun, 1130–1194, Longman, 1970.
- Great Architecture of the World, Littlehampton Book Services Ltd, 1975 ISBN 978-0-85533-067-5
- Venice: The Rise to Empire, Allen Lane, 1977 ISBN 978-0-7139-0742-1
- Venice: The Greatness and Fall, Allen Lane, 1981 ISBN 978-0-7139-1409-2
- A History of Venice, Knopf, 1982 / Penguin, 1983 ISBN 978-0-679-72197-0, single-volume combined edition
- Britain's Heritage (editor), HarperCollins, 1983 ISBN 978-0-246-11840-0
- The Italian World: History, Art and the Genius of a People (editor), Thames & Hudson, 1983, ISBN 978-0-500-25088-4
- Hashish (photographs by Suomi La Valle, historical profile by John Julius Norwich), Quartet Books, 1984, ISBN 978-0-7043-2450-3
- The Architecture of Southern England, Macmillan, 1985, ISBN 978-0-333-22037-5
- Fifty Years of Glyndebourne, Cape, 1985, ISBN 978-0-224-02310-8
- A Taste for Travel, Macmillan, 1985, ISBN 978-0-333-38434-3
- Byzantium: The Early Centuries, Viking, 1988, ISBN 978-0-670-80251-7
- Venice: a Traveller's Companion (an anthology compiled by Lord Norwich), Constable, 1990, ISBN 978-0-09-467550-6
- Oxford Illustrated Encyclopaedia of Art (editor) Oxford, 1990
- The Normans in the South and The Kingdom in the Sun, on Norman Sicily, later republished as The Normans in Sicily, Penguin, 1992 (The Normans in the South, 1016–1130; originally published:- Harlow:Longman,1967—The Kingdom in the Sun, 1130–1194; originally published:- Harlow:Longman, 1970) ISBN 978-0-14-015212-8
- Byzantium; v. 2: The Apogee, Alfred A. Knopf, 1992, ISBN 978-0-394-53779-5
- Byzantium; v. 3: The Decline and Fall, Viking, 1995, ISBN 978-0-670-82377-2
- A Short History of Byzantium, Alfred A. Knopf, 1997, ISBN 978-0-679-45088-7
- The Twelve Days of Christmas (Correspondence) (illustrated by Quentin Blake), Doubleday, 1998 (spoof of the old favourite carol, "The Twelve Days of Christmas"), ISBN 978-0-385-41028-1
- Shakespeare's Kings: the Great Plays and the History of England in the Middle Ages: 1337–1485, New York: Scribner, 2000, ISBN 978-0-684-81434-6
- Treasures of Britain (editor), Everyman Publishers, 2002, ISBN 978-0-7495-3256-7
- Paradise of Cities, Venice and its Nineteenth-century Visitors, Viking/Penguin, 2003, ISBN 978-0-670-89401-7
- The Duff Cooper Diaries (editor), Weidenfeld & Nicolson, 2006, ISBN 978-0-7538-2105-3
- The Middle Sea: A History of the Mediterranean, Doubleday, 2006, ISBN 978-0-385-51023-3
- Trying to Please (autobiography), Wimborne Minster, Dovecote Press, 2008, ISBN 978-1-904349-58-7
- Christmas Crackers (anecdotes, trivia and witticisms collected from history and literature)
- More Christmas Crackers
- The Big Bang: Christmas Crackers, 2000–2009, Dovecote Press, 2010, ISBN 978-1-904349-84-6
- The Great Cities in History (editor), Thames and Hudson, 2009, ISBN 978-0-500-25154-6
- Absolute Monarchs: A History of the Papacy, Random House, 2011, ISBN 978-0-7011-8290-8 (US title for The Popes: A History)
- The Popes: A History, Chatto & Windus, 2011, ISBN 978-0-09-956587-1 (UK title for Absolute Monarchs: A History of the Papacy)
- A History of England in 100 Places: From Stonehenge to the Gherkin, John Murray, 2012, ISBN 978-1-84854-609-7
- Darling Monster: The Letters of Lady Diana Cooper to Her Son John Julius Norwich (editor), Chatto & Windus, 2013, ISBN 978-0-7011-8779-8
- Cities That Shaped the Ancient World (editor), Thames and Hudson Ltd, 2014, ISBN 978-0-500-25204-8
- Sicily: An Island at the Crossroads of History, Random House, 2015, ISBN 978-0-8129-9517-6
- Four Princes: Henry VIII, Francis I, Charles V, Suleiman the Magnificent and the Obsessions that Forged Modern Europe, John Murray, 2016, ISBN 978-1-47363-295-0
- An English Christmas – all of the best writings about this most memorable time of year, gathered into one book – edited by John Julius Norwich, 2017
- France: A History: from Gaul to de Gaulle, John Murray, 2018, ISBN 978-1-4736-6383-1
- A History of France, Atlantic Monthly Press, 2018, ISBN 978-0-8021-2890-4
- A Christmas Cracker being a commonplace selection, 2018, ISBN 978-0-9932126-2-8

== Sources ==
- Leaders & Legends: John Julius Norwich (In: Old Times; Winter/Spring, 2008)

Peerage of the United Kingdom
Preceded by Duff Cooper	Viscount Norwich; 1954–2018	Succeeded by Jason Cooper
