= Viscount Norwich =

Viscountcy in the Peerage of the United Kingdom

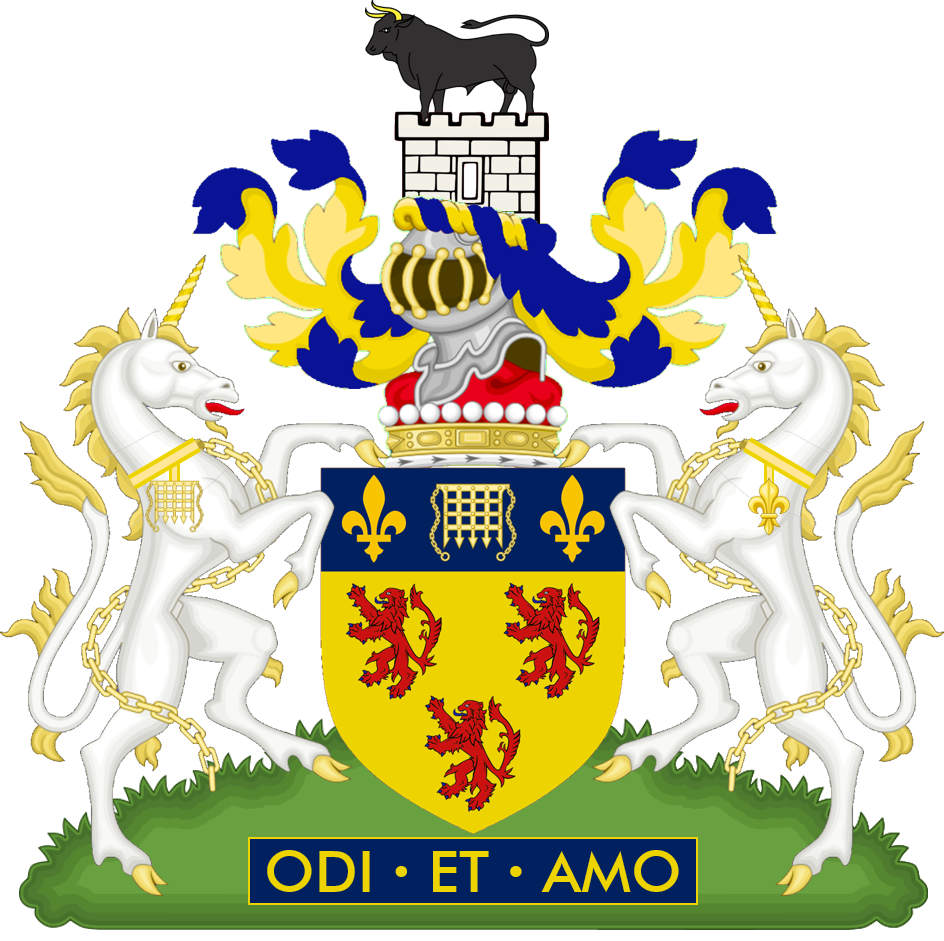
The arms of the Viscounts Norwich

Viscount Norwich, of Aldwick in the County of Sussex, is a title in the Peerage of the United Kingdom. It was created on 5 July 1952 for the Conservative politician, author and former ambassador to France, Sir Duff Cooper. He was the son of Sir Alfred Cooper and the husband of Lady Diana Manners. The second viscount, who succeeded his father in 1954, was a well-known historian, travel writer and television personality. As of 2021 the title is held by his son, the third viscount, who succeeded his father in 2018.

The author Artemis Cooper is the daughter of the second viscount Norwich.

== Viscounts Norwich (1952) ==
- Alfred Duff Cooper, 1st Viscount Norwich (1890–1954)
- John Julius Cooper, 2nd Viscount Norwich (1929–2018)
- Jason Charles Duff Bede Cooper, 3rd Viscount Norwich (b. 1959)

There is no heir to the viscountcy.
