= Duff Cooper =

British Conservative politician (1890–1954)

The Right Honourable The Viscount Norwich GCMG DSO PC
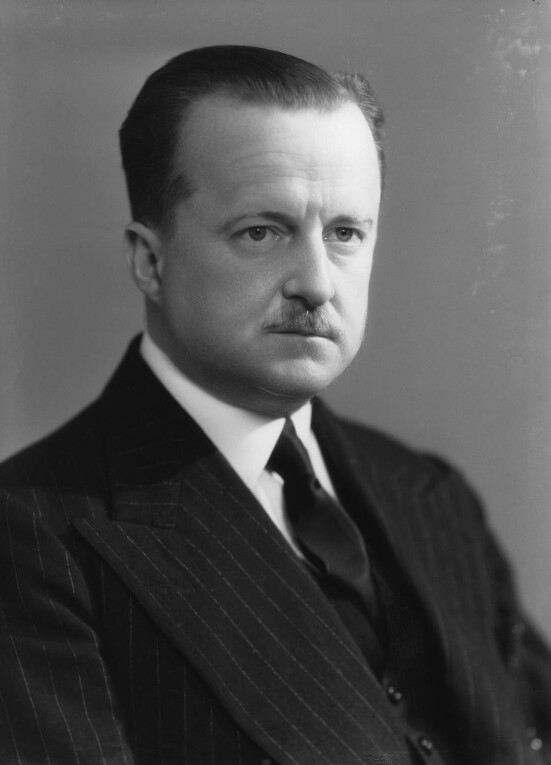
- Cooper in 1939

Secretary of State for War
- In office 22 November 1935 – 28 May 1937
- Monarchs: George V Edward VIII; George VI
- Prime Minister: Stanley Baldwin
- Preceded by: The Viscount Halifax
- Succeeded by: Leslie Hore-Belisha

First Lord of the Admiralty
- In office 28 October 1937 – 3 October 1938
- Monarch: George VI
- Prime Minister: Neville Chamberlain
- Preceded by: Sir Samuel Hoare
- Succeeded by: The Earl Stanhope

Minister of Information
- In office 12 May 1940 – 20 July 1941
- Monarch: George VI
- Prime Minister: Winston Churchill
- Preceded by: Sir John Reith
- Succeeded by: Brendan Bracken

Chancellor of the Duchy of Lancaster
- In office 20 July 1941 – 11 November 1943
- Prime Minister: Winston Churchill
- Preceded by: The Lord Hankey
- Succeeded by: Ernest Brown

British Ambassador to France
- In office 1944–1948
- Monarch: George VI
- Preceded by: Vacant due to German occupation
- Succeeded by: Oliver Harvey

Personal details
- Born: Alfred Duff Cooper; 22 February 1890 London, England
- Died: 1 January 1954 (aged 63) at sea, North Atlantic
- Party: Conservative
- Spouse: Lady Diana Manners (m. 1919)
- Children: John Julius
- Parent(s): Sir Alfred Cooper; Lady Agnes Duff
- Education: New College, Oxford

Military service
- Branch/service: British Army
- Rank: Lieutenant
- Unit: Grenadier Guards
- Battles/wars: First World War: Western Front
- Awards: Distinguished Service Order; Mentioned in Despatches

Alfred Duff Cooper, 1st Viscount Norwich, GCMG, DSO, PC (22 February 1890 – 1 January 1954), known as Duff Cooper, was a British Conservative Party politician and diplomat who was also a military and political historian and writer.

First elected to Parliament in 1924, he lost his seat in 1929 but returned to Parliament in the 1931 Westminster St George's by-election, which was seen as a referendum on Stanley Baldwin's leadership of the Conservative Party. He later served in the Cabinet as Secretary of State for War and First Lord of the Admiralty. He resigned from the cabinet over the Munich Agreement of 1938.

When Winston Churchill became prime minister in May 1940, he named Cooper as Minister of Information. In 1941, as a member of the Cabinet, Cooper served as British Minister in Singapore before its fall to the Japanese. He later served an important role as representative to Charles de Gaulle's Free France (1943–1944) and ambassador to France from 1944 to 1948.

== Background and education ==
Duff Cooper was born at Cavendish Square. He was the only son of the society doctor Sir Alfred Cooper (1838–1908), a surgeon who specialised in the sexual diseases of the upper classes (his carriage was humorously known as "Cooper's Clap Trap"), and Lady Agnes Cecil Emmeline Duff, daughter of James Duff, 5th Earl Fife and descendant of King William IV. She had already eloped with two husbands, the first of whom she deserted and the second of whom died, before she married Cooper in 1882. Duff Cooper had three older sisters and one older half-sister from his mother's first marriage. He attended two prep schools, including Wixenford. He was unhappy at prep school but was then very happy at Eton College.

== Oxford and early career ==
At New College Oxford (1908–1911), Cooper's Eton friendship with John Neville Manners won him entry into a circle of young aristocrats and intellectuals known as "The Coterie", including Patrick Shaw-Stewart, Raymond Asquith, Sir Denis Anson, Edward Horner and Lady Diana Manners. Cooper cultivated a reputation for eloquence and fast living, and although he had established a reputation as a poet, he earned an even stronger reputation for gambling, womanising and drinking in his studied emulation of the life of the 18th- and 19th-century Whig statesman Charles James Fox. Cooper's memory and gift for writing enabled him to do reasonably well at exams. He obtained a second in Modern History.

Following Oxford, Cooper entered the Foreign Service in October 1913, at the third attempt. During the war, he worked in the commercial and the contraband departments. Owing to the national importance of his work at the cipher desk, he was exempted from military service until June 1917, when he joined the Grenadier Guards. He had not actively sought to join the army but was happy to be "released" as a result of the manpower shortage, as he thought joining the Army the decent thing to do. To his surprise, most of his fellow officer cadets were working-class and lower-middle-class men, almost all of whom had already served in the ranks.

Cooper spent six months on the Western Front during which he, Philip Ziegler wrote, proved himself "exceptionally courageous, resourceful, and a natural leader of men" when the life expectancy of junior officers was very brief. He suffered a minor wound in the advance to the Albert Canal in August 1918 and was awarded the Distinguished Service Order (DSO) for conspicuous gallantry, a rare decoration for a junior officer. The citation for his DSO appeared in The London Gazette in November 1918 and reads as follows:

For conspicuous gallantry during an attack. Although the remainder of his company lost direction he led his platoon on to the objective and captured part of it. When supports arrived he led two sections against a machine-gun post, the four men immediately behind him were shot, but he went on alone and compelled the surrender of eighteen men and two machine guns. Later, with a patrol of six men he succeeded in capturing eighty-nine prisoners. He showed splendid courage and devotion to duty.

Almost all of his closest friends, including Shaw-Stewart, Horner and Asquith, were killed in the war, which allowed him to draw closer to Lady Diana Manners, a socialite who was known for her eccentricities.

== Post-war and marriage ==
After demobilisation, he returned to the Egypt Department and was then Private Secretary to the Parliamentary Under-Secretary (i.e., assistant to the junior minister). He needed money to enter politics. He played significant roles in the Egyptian and Turkish Crises in the early 1920s.

On 2 June 1919, he married Lady Diana Manners, whose family were initially opposed to the match. Diana's mother, in particular, thought Cooper a promiscuous drinker and gambler, who was without title, position or wealth. Diana was officially the daughter of the 8th Duke of Rutland but was widely believed, by herself included, to be the natural daughter of Harry Cust, a Belvoir Castle neighbour and MP. In 1923, Lady Diana played the Madonna in the Max Reinhardt play The Miracle. The money which she earned enabled Cooper to resign from the Foreign Office in July 1924.

Lady Diana tolerated Cooper's numerous affairs. They included the Franco-American Singer sewing-machine heiress Daisy Fellowes, the socialite Gloria Guinness, the French novelist Louise Leveque de Vilmorin and the writer Susan Mary Alsop (then an American diplomat's wife, by whom he had an illegitimate son, William Patten Jr, who later fathered W. Samuel Patten). The polo player "Boy" Capel's wife, Diana, and the Anglo-Irish socialite and fashion model Maxime de la Falaise were two more, but Lady Diana reportedly did not mind and loved him nonetheless; she explained to their son: "They were the flowers, but I was the tree".

== Political career, 1924–1939 ==
=== 1924–1931: In and out of Parliament ===
Within weeks, Cooper was selected for the winnable seat of Oldham, where he was elected at the general election in October 1924, with a 13,000 majority over the sitting Labour member. He made a very successful maiden speech on Egypt, which was praised by H. A. L. Fisher, who spoke next. The speech was also praised in several newspaper accounts. He was seen as a "coming man" within the party. Cooper was a stalwart supporter of Prime Minister Stanley Baldwin and a friend of the Chancellor of the Exchequer, Winston Churchill. In January 1928, he was appointed Financial Secretary to the War Office, not a position that he would have chosen. Secretary of State Sir Laming Worthington-Evans gave him much responsibility. Cooper very likely would have been promoted if the Conservatives had won the election in 1929, but they were defeated, and he lost his own seat.

John Julius, his only legitimate child, was born in 1929. Out of Parliament, Cooper wrote a biography of the French statesman Talleyrand, Napoleon's famous chief diplomat. He wrote slowly but seldom needed to revise his drafts. Ziegler writes that "rarely can subject and author have been more satisfactorily matched" as both men were worldly and disliked cant. The book was eventually published in 1932 by his nephew Rupert Hart-Davis to critical praise and lasting success.

=== 1931–1935: By-election and junior minister ===
The March 1931 by-election for the constituency of Westminster St George's (caused by the death of Cooper's recent boss, Laming Worthington-Evans), saw Beaverbrook's Empire Free Trade Crusade party threatening the Conservative position at a time when satisfaction with Baldwin's leadership was at a low. When the original Conservative candidate, John Moore-Brabazon, stepped down, Duff Cooper agreed to contest the election in what was regarded as a referendum on Baldwin's leadership. He won the seat with a majority of 5,710, thus returning to Parliament and serving until 1945.

In August 1931, on the formation of the National Government, he was appointed Financial Secretary to the War Office under the elderly Lord Crewe, who left Cooper to do a great deal of the work. In June 1934 he was appointed Financial Secretary to the Treasury, a traditional stepping stone to the Cabinet. This brought him close to the Chancellor of the Exchequer Neville Chamberlain, who thought highly of him. He had been to Nazi Germany and had seen and been appalled by a Nuremberg Rally. Chamberlain told him to tone down his criticisms of Hitler. Cooper urged rearmament, which was not then a fashionable view, and briefed Winston Churchill, who was then on the backbenches, that Hitler seriously wanted war.

=== Haig biography ===
Cooper, keen to make a literary name for himself, was approached by the executors of Field Marshal Haig in March 1933 to write his official biography, after a number of military and literary figures had declined. He insisted on full access to Haig's papers and relied heavily on Haig's (as yet unpublished) diaries. Haig's widow then had second thoughts and wrote a book of her own, The Man I Knew, whose publication Faber and Faber delayed with legal action until after Duff Cooper had published his two volumes in 1935 and 1936.

Stephen Heathorn describes Cooper's biography as "the apogee of the admiring biography [of Haig]", following in the tradition of previous works by Dewar & Boraston (1922), George Arthur (1928) and John Charteris (1929). He stressed Haig's strong and upright character, as if he were writing about a Victorian hero. He wrote that there was "no room for thoughts of petty malice or of mean revenge in that high and honourable man" (Vol. 2, p. 98) and that "in moral stature Haig was a giant" (pp. 440–1). David Lloyd George's memoirs were appearing as Cooper was writing and some of his book was devoted to addressing Lloyd George's arguments. Cooper argued that Haig's offensive on the Somme saved the French at Verdun, Haig improved Anglo-French relations and Haig defeated the Germans through inflicting attrition on them on the Somme and at Ypres. The book received many generous reviews and remained the leading biography of Haig until John Terraine's The Educated Soldier in 1963.

Historians' view of Haig would be dramatically changed by the 1952 publication of his Private Papers, which revealed his political intrigues, and his privately-uncharitable view of various British officers and politicians and of the French in general. At the time, Cooper admitted to Robert Blake, the editor of that work, that he had been influenced by the politics of the 1930s and the desire to facilitate Anglo-French rapprochement. Modern views of Cooper's biography are less favourable: George Egerton, writing in The Journal of Modern History in 1988, detected a conflict between Cooper the writer, who concealed the degree to which Haig, like everybody else, was dwarfed by events, and the historian, who was too honest to pretend that he dominated them. Ziegler wrote that the book was criticised for pro-Haig bias and what Ziegler calls the "lack of consideration".

=== 1935–1938: Cabinet and resignation ===
In November 1935, after the general election, Cooper was promoted to the Cabinet as Secretary of State for War and appointed to the Privy Council. During the Abdication Crisis he was sympathetic to Edward VIII and to the possibility of a morganatic marriage, and in vain advised him to wait until after his coronation (due in 1937) before picking a fight with the government over his plans to marry Wallis Simpson.

He felt out of kilter with the Conservative leadership and was surprised when the new prime minister, Neville Chamberlain, appointed him First Lord of the Admiralty in May 1937. Ziegler wrote that his tenure of office was "an unequivocal success". Cooper enjoyed high living on board the Admiralty yacht HMS Enchantress but fought Chamberlain and the Chancellor of the Exchequer Sir John Simon for more spending on the Royal Navy. Chamberlain saw him as indiscreet and as a firebrand. By the time of the Munich Agreement, Cooper was isolated in the Cabinet as the most public critic of Chamberlain's appeasement policy.

On 3 October 1938, a few days after the Munich Agreement, he denounced it and resigned from the Cabinet. On doing, so he said that "war with honour or peace with dishonour" he might have been persuaded to accept, "but war with dishonour—that was too much". The fellow opponent of appeasement and Conservative Party MP Vyvyan Adams described Cooper's actions as "the first step in the road back to national sanity".

As a backbencher, Cooper joined the coterie around Anthony Eden, who had resigned as Foreign Secretary in February 1938, but Cooper made only muted criticisms of the government. His main source of income was writing articles for the Evening Standard. He argued for an Anglo-French alliance.

In her book The Light of Common Day, Lady Diana Cooper reminisced back to 1 September 1939. She and Duff were lunching at London's Savoy Grill with the pro-Nazi Duke of Westminster (nicknamed "Bendor"). She recalled:

When he [the Duke of Westminster] added that Hitler knew after all that we were his best friends, he set off the powder-magazine. "I hope", Duff spat, "that by tomorrow he will know that we are his most implacable and remorseless enemies". Next day "Bendor", telephoning to a friend, said that if there was a war it would be entirely due to the Jews and Duff Cooper.

Britain declared war on Nazi Germany on 3 September 1939, two days after the German invasion of Poland.

== Second World War ==
=== Minister of Information ===
By now, German propaganda ranked Cooper with Churchill and Eden as Britain's most dangerous Conservative warmongers. Unlike the other two, Cooper was not offered a job on the outbreak of war in September 1939. He went on a lecture tour of the United States, where he called for the liberal democracies to stand firm against the dictatorships and predicted that Churchill would become Prime Minister, which seemed an eccentric prediction at the time.

From May 1940, he was Minister of Information under Churchill, but disliked the job. His son John Julius said that his father was "out of sympathy" with the job from the beginning because he was opposed to censorship. The press, led by the newspaper magnate Lord Beaverbrook and his Daily Express, portrayed Cooper as a spin doctor and as an enemy of a free press. His Wartime Social Survey inquirers into the state of public morale were known as "Cooper's snoopers". He authorised a strong denunciation of the author P. G. Wodehouse for making an ill-advised humorous broadcast from Berlin. He and Lady Diana sent their eleven-year-old son John Julius to the US in 1940, as they feared that Cooper's being on Hitler's blacklist might lead to their son being killed or taken as a hostage in the event of a German invasion. Many of Cooper's friends and colleagues took a dim view, and it earned Cooper further criticism in the press and some hostile questioning from MPs in Parliament. John Julius returned two years later.

=== Singapore ===
In July 1941 Cooper was appointed Chancellor of the Duchy of Lancaster to his relief. He was one of a number of Churchill's proteges promoted in the July 1941 reshuffle. Duncan Sandys became Financial Secretary at the War Office, and Brendan Bracken became Minister of Information. Cuthbert Headlam wrote of Cooper at this time that "he has failed in every job he has been given, is clearly incompetent as an administrator, but belongs to the Winston clique".

Cooper was sent to Singapore as Minister Resident, charged with reporting on the situation in the Far East and the state of British defences. He had the authority to form a War Cabinet there, but both military and civil authorities were reluctant to cooperate with him. To his relief, Archibald Wavell was appointed Supreme Commander ABDA. He was, unfairly in Ziegler's view, blamed for the fall of Singapore after his return to the UK and was not given another major post for a year and a half. In the meantime he chaired the Cabinet Committee on Security and did much writing. He spent his weekends at Bognor, where his wife had a smallholding.

=== Ambassador to France ===
In December 1943, Cooper was appointed British Representative on the Free French French Committee of National Liberation. His remit included maintaining a working relationship between Churchill and de Gaulle, two men whom he found equally difficult. Paris was liberated in August 1944, and he moved there in September. On 18 November 1944 he formally presented his credentials as British Ambassador to France. He was to prove a very popular ambassador, with Lady Diana helping to make his term of office a great social success. Some contemporary eyebrows were raised at his willingness to entertain people with dubious records during the recent war and his lack of interest at entertaining trade unionists. In the words of the British historian P. M. H. Bell, Cooper was such a "devoted Francophile" and during his time as ambassador to Paris often tried the patience of the Foreign Office by going well beyond his instructions to maintain good relations with France and attempt to create an Anglo-French alliance, which would dominate post-war Europe.

Despite being a Conservative, Cooper was not replaced as Ambassador when Labour won the 1945 election as Ernest Bevin, the new Foreign Secretary, valued an ambassador who was close friends with so many French politicians and even managed to have a friendship of sorts with de Gaulle. In January 1947, Cooper, acting without orders, began the process that led to the Treaty of Dunkirk when he suggested to French Prime Minister Leon Blum that there should an Anglo-French military alliance. Blum took up the idea since he thought it to be an offer from London. The treaty, which fulfilled Cooper's long-held desire for an Anglo-French alliance, was signed on 4 March 1947.

Cooper's term as ambassador ended at the end of 1947. He bequeathed a large part of his library to the British Embassy in Paris. To the dismay of his successor, Cooper remained in Paris and at the Château Saint-Firmin, in Chantilly Park.

== Retirement ==
Cooper was raised to the Order of St Michael and St George (GCMG) in 1948. He took on some company directorships, including that of the Wagons-Lits company, but essentially devoted the rest of his life to writing. During the war he had written David, a life of the Biblical King David, and in 1949, he published Sergeant Shakespeare, a book about Shakespeare's early life. The Cabinet Office tried in vain, on security grounds, to block publication of his only novel, Operation Heartbreak (1950), as it was based on the real Operation Mincemeat, a successful British deception operation during the Second World War to disguise the 1943 Allied invasion of Sicily. The book was republished by Persephone Books in 2004.

He was created Viscount Norwich of Aldwick in the County of Sussex, in 1952, in recognition of his political and literary career. The title was not popular with some of the local dignitaries. His wife refused to be called Lady Norwich; she claimed that it sounded too much like "porridge" and promptly took out a newspaper advertisement declaring that she would retain her previous style of Lady Diana Cooper. Cooper's sixth and final book was his acclaimed memoirs, Old Men Forget, which appeared on 5 July 1953. The Duff Cooper Diaries: 1915–1951, edited by his son John Julius Norwich, appeared posthumously in 2005.

== Death ==
Cooper was intemperate in his drinking (and eating) habits throughout his adult life. As a result, in later life he developed cirrhosis of the liver, and œsophageal varices. This resulted in his suffering a fatal gastro-intestinal hæmorrhage on 31 December 1953 when he was on board the French liner Colombie. The ship's doctor was unable to arrest the bleeding, and Cooper died suddenly, from hypovolæmic shock, on 1 January 1954, aged 63. The ship docked at the Spanish port of Vigo so that his body could be flown back to England, where he was buried in the mausoleum of the Manners family at Belvoir Castle in the Vale of Belvoir, Leicestershire. His estate was valued for probate at £14,303 7s (equivalent to £340,000 in 2025).

== Legacy ==
After Cooper's death, a British literary award, the Duff Cooper Prize, was established in his name. His biographer Ziegler wrote that Cooper was "not totally successful in worldly terms but never dull", though he was "arrogant, self-indulgent and selfish, and devoted far too much time and energy to wine, women and gambling". However, he was "never mean or ignoble" and was "a proud patriot" who sometimes had "true nobility", although he was "too proud to court popularity" and too reserved to attract it readily.

On 28 November 2021, Cooper was posthumously awarded the Order of the White Lion, the highest decoration of Czechoslovakia and the Czech Republic, in recognition of his opposition to the Munich Agreement.

== In popular culture ==
H. G. Wells, in The Shape of Things to Come which was published in 1934, predicted a Second World War in which Britain would not participate but would vainly try to effect a peaceful compromise. In this vision, Duff Cooper was mentioned as one of several prominent Britons delivering "brilliant pacific speeches" which "echo throughout Europe" but fail to end the war; the other would-be peacemakers, in Wells' vision, included Leslie Hore Belisha, Ellen Wilkinson and Randolph Churchill.

== Family and ancestry ==
Cooper was married to Lady Diana from 1919 to his death and their only child was John Julius Norwich (1929–2018), who became well known as a writer and television presenter. Cooper's granddaughter Artemis has published several books, including A Durable Fire: The Letters of Duff and Diana Cooper, 1913–50.

One of Cooper's maternal great-great-grandfathers was King William IV. He fathered eight illegitimate children with Dorothea Jordan, including Lady Elizabeth FitzClarence. She married William Hay, 18th Earl of Erroll, and one of their children was Lady Agnes Hay, Cooper's grandmother. Lady Agnes married James Duff, 5th Earl Fife, and they had five children including Cooper's mother, Lady Agnes Duff. Cooper's sister Stephanie was the paternal great-grandmother of prime minister David Cameron.

=== Genealogy ===
Ancestors of Duff Cooper

8. Charles Cooper
4. William Cooper
9. Rose Hannah White
2. Sir Alfred Cooper
10. William Heath Marsh
5. Anne Marsh
11. Mary Leader
1. Duff Cooper
12. Sir Alexander Duff
6. James Duff, 5th Earl Fife
13. Anne Stein
3. Lady Agnes Duff
14. William Hay, 18th Earl of Erroll
7. Lady Agnes Hay
15. Lady Elizabeth FitzClarence

=== Arms ===
Coat of arms of Duff Cooper
Crest On the Battlements of a Tower Argent a Bull passant Sable armed and unguled Or Escutcheon Or three Lions rampant Gules on a Chief Azure a Portcullis chained between two Fleurs-de-lis of the first Supporters On either side a Unicorn Argent gorged with a Collar with Chain reflexed over the back Or pendent from the collar of the dexter a Portcullis chained and from that of the sinister a Fleur-de-lys both Gold Motto Odi et Amo; Latin, "I hate and I love" Orders Order of St Michael & St George (not pictured)

Parliament of the United Kingdom
Preceded by William John Tout; Edward Grigg	Member of Parliament for Oldham; 1924–1929; With: William Wiggins	Succeeded by James Wilson; Gordon Lang
Preceded by Sir Laming Worthington-Evans	Member of Parliament for Westminster St George's; 1931–1945	Succeeded by Arthur Howard
Political offices
Preceded by Douglas King	Financial Secretary to the War Office; 1928–1929	Succeeded by Manny Shinwell
Preceded by William Sanders	Financial Secretary to the War Office; 1931–1934	Succeeded by Douglas Hacking
Preceded by Leslie Hore-Belisha	Financial Secretary to the Treasury; 1934–1935	Succeeded by William Morrison
Preceded by The Viscount Halifax	Secretary of State for War; 1935–1937	Succeeded by Leslie Hore-Belisha
Preceded by Sir Samuel Hoare	First Lord of the Admiralty; 1937–1938	Succeeded by The Earl Stanhope
Preceded by Sir John Reith	Minister of Information; 1940–1941	Succeeded by Brendan Bracken
Preceded by The Lord Hankey	Chancellor of the Duchy of Lancaster; 1941–1943	Succeeded by Ernest Brown
Diplomatic posts
Vacant German occupation of France during World War II. Title last held by Ronald Campbell	British Ambassador to France; 1944–1948	Succeeded by Oliver Harvey
Peerage of the United Kingdom
New creation	Viscount Norwich; 1952–1954	Succeeded by John Julius Cooper
