= Duff Hart-Davis =

British biographer, naturalist and journalist (1936–2025)

Hart-Davis

Peter Duff Hart-Davis (3 June 1936 – 10 July 2025), generally known as Duff Hart-Davis was a British biographer, naturalist and journalist, who wrote for The Independent. He was married to Phyllida Barstow and had one son and one daughter, the journalist Alice Hart-Davis. He lived at Owlpen, in Gloucestershire.

== Life and career ==
Hart-Davis was born on 3 June 1936, as the eldest son of the publisher Rupert Hart-Davis, the nephew of the socialite Deirdre Hart-Davis, and the brother of television broadcaster and author Adam Hart-Davis and Bridget, the dowager Lady Silsoe. His biography of his godfather, the adventurer and writer Peter Fleming, entitled Peter Fleming: A Biography, was published in 1974. Hart-Davis died on 10 July 2025, at the age of 89.

== Bibliography ==
=== Non-fiction ===
- Behind the Scenes on a Newspaper (1964)
- Ascension: The Story of a South Atlantic Island (1972) ISBN 0-385-00314-5
- Peter Fleming: A Biography (1974) ISBN 0-224-01028-X
- Monarchs of the Glen: A History of Deer-Stalking in the Scottish Highlands (1978) ISBN 0-224-01463-3
- Fighter Pilot (1981), co-written with Colin Strong
- Hitler's Games: The 1936 Olympics (1986) ISBN 0-06-015554-X
- Armada (1988) ISBN 0-593-01231-3
- Country Matters (1988)
- House the Berrys Built (1990) Concerns the history of The Daily Telegraph from its inception to 1990. Illustrated with references and illustrations of William Ewart Berry, 1st Viscount Camrose (later called Lord Camrose).
- Wildings: The Secret Garden of Eileen Soper (1991)
- Further Country Matters (1992) ISBN 1-85310-323-3
- When the Country Went to Town: The Countryside Marches and Rally of 1997 (1997)
- Raoul Millais: His Life and Work (1998) ISBN 1-85310-977-0
- Fauna Britannica: The Practical Guide to Wild & Domestic Creatures of Britain (2002) ISBN 0-297-82532-1
- Audubon's Elephant: America's Greatest Naturalist and the Making of the Birds of America (2003) ISBN 0-8050-7568-2
- Honorary Tiger: The Life of Billy Arjan Singh (2005) ISBN 81-7436-405-6
- Philip de László: His Life and Art (2010) ISBN 978-0-300-13716-3
- The War That Never Was: The True Story of the Men who Fought Britain's Most Secret Battle (2011) ISBN 9780099553298 (see North Yemen Civil War)
- Among The Deer, In the Woods and on the Hill, A Stalker Looks Back (2011) ISBN 978-1-84689-096-3
- Man of War: Officer, Adventurer, Agent (2013) Biography of Commander Alan Hillgarth ISBN 978-0-09-956866-7

=== Novels ===
- The Megacull (1968) ISBN 0-09-455760-8
- Gold of St. Matthew (1970) ISBN 0-09-456890-1 Published in the U.S. as Gold trackers (1970)
- Spider in the Morning (1972) ISBN 0-09-458610-1
- The Heights of Rimring (1980) ISBN 0-224-01837-X Republished in Mammoth book of spy thrillers, ed. John Winwood (1989) ISBN 0-88184-481-0
- Level Five (1982) ISBN 0-224-01828-0
- Fire Falcon (1983) ISBN 0-224-02080-3
- The Man-Eater of Jassapur (1985) ISBN 0-224-02995-9
- Horses of War (1991) ISBN 1-85619-062-5
- The Stalking Party (2015) ISBN 978-1910723043 (as D.P. Hart-Davis)

=== As editor ===
- End of an era : letters and journals of Sir Alan Lascelles, 1887–1920 (1986) ISBN 0-241-11960-X
- In Royal Service: Letters and Journals of Sir Alan Lascelles, Vol. 2, 1920–36 (1989)
- Eileen Soper's Book of Badgers (1992)
- Pavilions of Splendour: An Architectural History of Lord's (2004)
- King's Counsellor Abdication and War: the Diaries of Sir Alan Lascelles (2006)
