= List of Desert Island Discs episodes (1942–1946) =

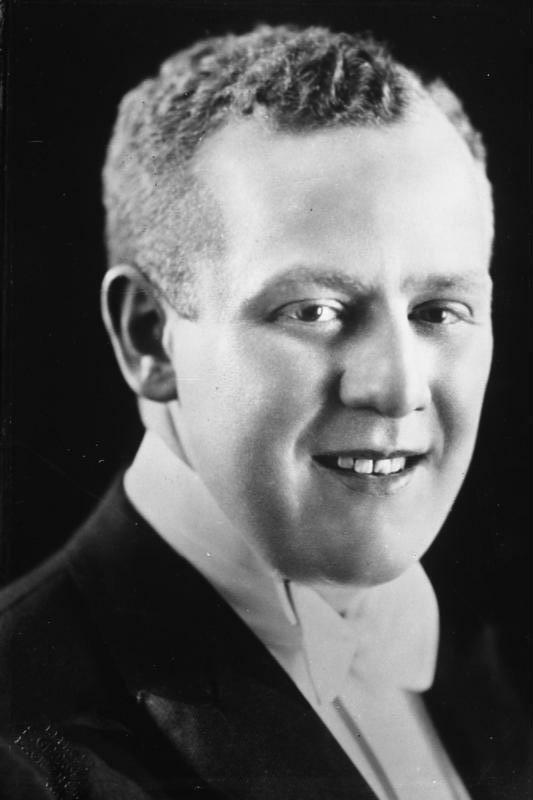
Jack Hylton was one of the first celebrities to be cast away.

The BBC Radio 4 programme Desert Island Discs invites celebrities to become "castaways" and choose eight pieces of music that they would take to an imaginary desert island, where they will be marooned indefinitely. During the period listed here, the later rule allowing castaways a book and a luxury item had not yet been introduced and as such, choices have not been listed.

== 1942 ==
Date	Castaway	Book	Luxury
29 January 1942	Vic Oliver	No book	No item
5 February 1942	James Agate	No book	No item
12 February 1942	Commander A B Campbell	No book	No item
19 February 1942	C B Cochran	No book	No item
26 February 1942	Pat Kirkwood	No book	Gardenia bush
5 March 1942	Jack Hylton	No book	No item
12 March 1942	Captain A E Dingle	No book	No item
19 March 1942	Joan Jay	No book	No item
26 March 1942	Reverend Canon W H Elliott	No book	No item
2 April 1942	Arthur Askey	No book	No item
9 April 1942	Eva Turner	No book	No item
16 April 1942	Harry Parry	No book	No item
23 April 1942	Tom Webster	No book	No item
30 April 1942	Ivor Novello	No book	No item
7 May 1942	Roy Plomley	No book	No item
9 July 1942	Beatrice Lillie	No book	No item
23 July 1942	Leslie Howard	No book	No item
6 August 1942	Nathaniel Gubbins	No book	No item
20 August 1942	Barrington Dalby	No book	No item
10 September 1942	Emlyn Williams	No book	No item
17 September 1942	Lord Elton	No book	No item
25 September 1942	Richard Tauber	No book	No item
9 October 1942	Jonah Barrington	No book	No item
24 October 1942	Michael Powell	No book	No item
3 December 1942	Admiral Sir Edward Evans	No book	No item

== 1943 ==
Date	Castaway	Book	Luxury
20 March 1943	Donald McCullough	No book	No item
12 April 1943	Ian Hay	No book	No item
8 June 1943	Tom Driberg	No book	No item
19 June 1943	Frank Swinnerton	No book	No item
26 June 1943	Beverley Baxter	No book	No item
16 July 1943	Herbert Hodge	No book	No item
26 July 1943	C. A. Lejeune	No book	No item
16 August 1943	Ivor Brown	No book	No item
2 October 1943	Tom Harrisson	No book	No item
5 October 1943	Lady Eleanor Smith	No book	No item
11 October 1943	Sir Stephen Tallents	No book	No item
16 November 1943	C. H. Middleton	No book	No item
23 November 1943	J. B. Morton	No book	No item
31 December 1943	Charles Hill	No book	No item

== 1944 ==
Date	Castaway	Book	Luxury
8 January 1944	Alan Dent	No book	No item
29 January 1944	Pamela Frankau	No book	No item
12 February 1944	Ralph Reader	No book	No item
19 February 1944	Wing Commander Guy Gibson	No book	No item
20 March 1944	Mabel Constanduros	No book	No item

== 1945 ==
Date	Castaway	Book	Luxury
4 August 1945	Frederick Grisewood	No book	No item
11 August 1945	Peter Fettes	No book	No item
18 August 1945	Jill Balcon	No book	No item
25 August 1945	Michael Harrison	No book	No item
1 September 1945	Joan Edgar	No book	No item
8 September 1945	Roy Williams	No book	No item
15 September 1945	Alvar Lidell	No book	No item
22 September 1945	Pat Butler	No book	No item
29 September 1945	Margaret Hubble	No book	No item
6 October 1945	Michael Redgrave	No book	No item
13 October 1945	Claire Luce	No book	No item
20 October 1945	C. E. M. Joad	No book	No item
27 October 1945	Celia Johnson	No book	No item
3 November 1945	Valerie Hobson	No book	No item
10 November 1945	Bobby Howes	No book	No item
17 November 1945	Deborah Kerr	No book	No item
24 November 1945	Henry Wheeler	No book	No item
1 December 1945	Eileen Joyce	No book	No item
8 December 1945	Stewart Granger	No book	No item
15 December 1945	Richard Goolden	No book	No item
22 December 1945	Nova Pilbeam	No book	No item
29 December 1945	Sonia Dresdel	No book	No item

== 1946 ==
Date	Castaway	Book	Luxury
5 January 1946	Barbara Mullen	No book	No item
