= Old Men Forget =

1953 book by Duff Cooper

- First edition
- Author: Duff Cooper
- Genre: Autobiography
- Publisher: Rupert Hart-Davis
- Publication date: 1953

Old Men Forget is a 1953 autobiography by Duff Cooper, Viscount Norwich, detailing his Victorian childhood, Edwardian youth, and work in literature and politics.

== Publishing history, content and reception ==
The title is taken from the St Crispin's Day Speech by King Henry in Act IV, Scene 3 of Shakespeare's Henry V:

Old men forget: yet all shall be forgot
But he'll remember with advantages
What feats he did that day.

Despite the title, Cooper was in his early sixties when he wrote the book, having retired from public life in 1947 at the age of fifty-seven. The publisher Rupert Hart-Davis, who was Cooper's nephew, published the first edition in November 1953.

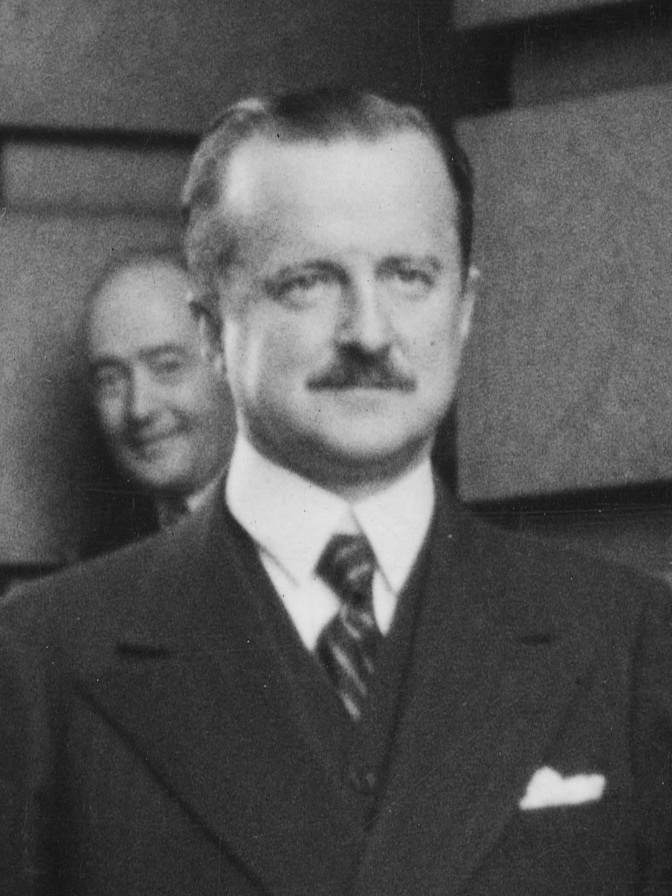
Cooper in 1941

The book covers Cooper's early years – his schooldays at Eton, studies and socialising at Oxford – followed by his army service in the First World War, in which he fought in the trenches and was one of the few members of his intimate circle to survive the war. In peacetime he was an official in the Foreign Office until entering Parliament in 1924. The book includes an account of Field Marshal Allenby's struggles with David Lloyd George over Egypt, seen from Cooper's viewpoint as a public servant. The bulk of the book deals with Cooper's political career in the Conservative Party, as an MP and minister. His accounts of the appeasement years before the Second World War include severe criticism of Neville Chamberlain and The Times. Under Winston Churchill, Cooper served as Minister of Information, Resident Minister at Singapore, Representative to the French Committee of Liberation, and Ambassador to France. He recounts the fractious relations between Churchill and General de Gaulle, in which the latter is depicted with what a reviewer calls "admiration and respect, and at times with affectionate exasperation".

Old Men Forget was well received by reviewers. The Times said, "at times he can stir the reader deeply with his account of human sorrow or success. With all this he succeeds, not indeed in writing one of the greatest autobiographies, but at least in writing one where the many good things are a delight and which is always full of interest." In The Manchester Guardian, Roger Fulford wrote, "The gifts of understanding and of style, which distinguish this book, lift it above the serried ranks of recollections and memoirs into the realm of literature. Harold Nicolson in The Observer called the book "an autobiography which, in its perfect balance between the objective and the subjective … furnishes an example of the way in which this sort of thing should be done."

The book was reissued by Faber & Faber in 2011.

== References and sources ==
=== Sources ===
- Lyttelton, George; Hart-Davis-Rupert (1979). Lyttelton/Hart-Davis Letters, Volume 2. London: John Murray. ISBN 978-0-7195-3673-1.
