= Roy Williams =

Roy Williams may refer to:

== Entertainment ==
- Roy Williams (artist) (1907–1976), artist and entertainer for The Walt Disney Studios
- Roy Williams (broadcaster), BBC radio continuity announcer
- Roy Williams (trombonist) (born 1937), English trombonist
- Roy Williams (playwright) (born 1968), contemporary British playwright
- Roy H. Williams (born 1958), American non-fiction author

== Sports ==
=== American football ===
- Roy Williams (defensive tackle) (1937–2017), American football player
- Roy Williams (safety) (born 1980), American football safety
- Roy Williams (wide receiver) (born 1981), American football wide receiver

=== Other sports ===
- Roy Williams (decathlete) (born 1934), New Zealand athlete
- Roy Williams (Australian footballer, born 1929) (1929–1988), Australian footballer for Collingwood
- Roy Williams (Australian footballer, born 1907) (1907–1979), Australian footballer for Footscray
- Roy Williams (basketball coach) (born 1950), American basketball coach
- Roy Williams (basketball player) (1927–2020), Canadian basketball player
- Roy Williams (footballer) (1932–2011), Southampton and Hereford United footballer
- Roy Williams (cricketer) (1931–2024), English cricketer
- Roy K. Williams (1907–?), American baseball pitcher in the Negro leagues
- Roy S. Williams (1907–1944), American baseball pitcher in the Negro leagues
- Roy Williams (sprinter), winner of the 2000 4 × 400 meter relay at the NCAA Division I Indoor Track and Field Championships

== Other ==
- Roy Hughes Williams (1874–1946), justice of the Supreme Court of Ohio
- Roy Lee Williams (1915–1989), Teamsters labor union president
- Roy T. Williams (1883–1946), Church of the Nazarene superintendent
- Roy Williams (Scouting) (born 1944), Boy Scouts of America director
- Roy David Williams, physicist and data scientist
- Roy Williams Airport, in Joshua Tree, California
