= Arthur Bingham Walkley =

English writer

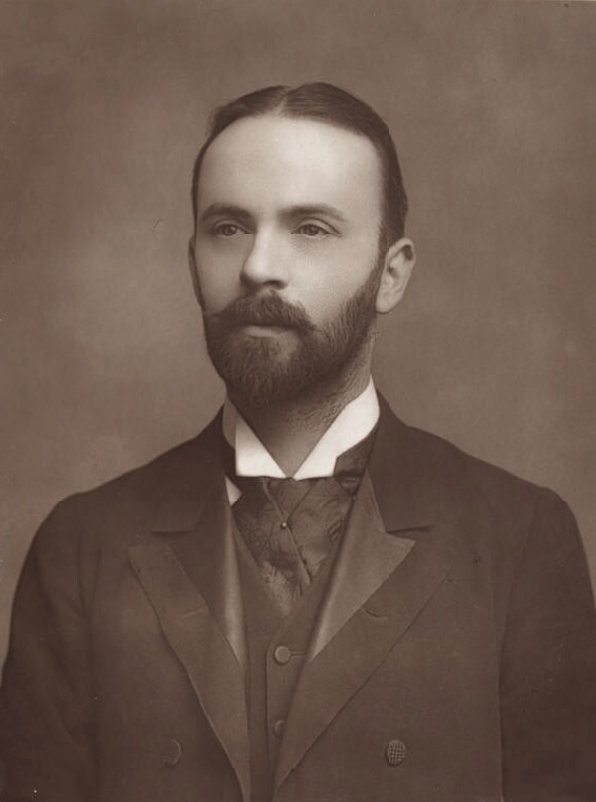
Arthur Bingham Walkley, 1892 photograph

Arthur Bingham Walkley (17 December 1855 – 7 October 1926), usually known as A B Walkley, was an English public servant and drama critic. As a civil servant he worked for the General Post Office from 1877 to 1919, in increasingly senior posts; he did not seek the highest official positions, preferring to leave himself time and energy for his parallel career as a drama critic. As a journalist he worked with Bernard Shaw on The Star at the beginning of his newspaper career; he is probably best known for his twenty-six years as theatre critic of The Times. He retired from the Post Office in 1919, and for the last six years of his life concentrated wholly on writing.

== Life and career ==
=== Early years and civil service career ===
Walkley was born at Bedminster, Bristol, the only child of Arthur Hickman Walkley, a bookseller, and his wife, Caroline Charlotte, née Bingham. He was educated at Lord Weymouth's School, Warminster, and then gained an exhibition in mathematics at Balliol College, Oxford, matriculating in October 1873. In January 1874 he migrated to Corpus Christi College, Oxford, having been elected a scholar there. He took a first class in both the mathematical moderations (1875) and the final school of mathematics (1877).

In June 1877 Walkley successfully entered an open competitive examination for appointment to the civil service; he was appointed a third-class clerk in the secretary's office of the General Post Office. On 29 March 1881 he married Frances Sarah Maud Antrobus Eldridge (1858–1934). There was one daughter of the marriage.

Walkley's abilities were recognised by the civil service. He was promoted successively to the grade of second-class clerk (1882), first-class clerk (1892), principal clerk (1899) and assistant secretary, in charge of the telegraph branch (1911). He represented the Post Office at three important international gatherings: in 1897 he was secretary of the British delegation to the Washington Postal Congress, in 1898 secretary to the Imperial Penny Postage Conference, and in 1906 a delegate to the Rome Postal Congress.

An obituary notice in The Times stated that Walkley could have risen to higher official positions, but chose not to pursue them, preferring to devote his energies to dramatic criticism. Nevertheless, he took a pride in the execution of his official work, which The Times considered "set a standard which has served as a model to the younger generation in the Civil Service". One of his juniors wrote, "He was frankly more interested in his literary than his official duties … but what he had to do officially he did with distinction. In June 1919 Walkley retired from the civil service.

=== Writer and critic ===
Walkley began his literary career as a reviewer of books in weekly and monthly periodicals. He turned to theatrical reviewing, inspired by the work of his friend the theatre critic William Archer. He contributed general articles to a weekly review, The Speaker during the 1880 and 1890s, and when the London evening newspaper The Star was founded in January 1888 he was appointed its theatre critic. One of his colleagues was Bernard Shaw who wrote music criticism under the pen name "Corno di Bassetto". On one occasion Walkley filled in for Shaw and signed himself "Bono di Corsetto", an early instance of a certain frivolous side to his writing – something that made many readers underestimate his fundamental seriousness. He remained with The Star until 1900. Under the by-line "Spectator" he wrote not only regular reviews but also occasional essays on the theatre in general.

In 1892 Walkley published his first book, a collection of his theatre reviews. The Times said of it, "Reprints of dramatic criticism are, as a rule, rather unsatisfying reading. But an exception may well be made in favour of Mr. Walkley's Playhouse Impressions." A selection from his miscellaneous essays in The Speaker, The Star, and elsewhere was published as Frames of Mind in 1899. This too was well received: "It is pleasant to wander with a companion so well read and so apt of quotation, and Mr. Walkley has an original way of looking around him."

=== The Times ===
In September 1899 Walkley contributed his first review to The Times; six months later he was appointed as the paper's drama critic. He contributed in 1900 and 1901 to Literature, a weekly offshoot of The Times, and, from 1902 to its successor, The Times Literary Supplement. In February 1903 he gave three lectures at the Royal Institution, which he printed as Dramatic Criticism (1903). He reprinted some of his articles for Literature and the TLS as his fourth book, Drama and Life (1907).

In 1911 Shaw parodied Walkley as the pompous theatre critic Mr Trotter in Fanny's First Play. Walkley was in on the joke and helped Claude King, the actor playing Trotter, to mimic his personal appearance. In his review he gravely noted that Trotter is a "pure figment of the imagination, wholly unlike any actual person".

After his retirement from the Post Office in July 1919 Walkley added to his regular theatre reviews a series of essays published weekly in The Times on a range of subjects close to his heart; these included Jane Austen (whom some thought the only English novelist he truly loved), (Note: Despite his love for Austen's novels, Walkley could not resist pointing out that they contained "twenty-five shrubberies and not one kiss.") Dr Johnson, Dickens and Lamb. He wrote frequently about France and French topics, including the works of Proust; he was a devoted Francophile, and even cultivated a French style in his personal appearance. These Wednesday Times essays were substantial, typically about 1,500 words and occasionally well over 3,000. (Note: For instance "Pastiches", 12 May 1920, p. 14 was 1,455 words; "Modern French Literature", 6 September 1919, p. 36 ran to 3,327 words.) His fellow critic St John Ervine wrote in The Observer:

Myself, on Wednesday mornings, I turned first to the [Walkley] column … for to open one's eyes and reach for The Times and read A.B.W. was an extraordinarily pleasant method of beginning a day. There was wit in his work, his words were well-selected words, his writing was easy (though not easily done) and had thought in it; and he pleased his readers with the suggestion of graceful scholarship in the lightest of his sentences. He abhorred solemnity and was embarrassed by earnest people or enthusiasts. Or so he pretended. His affection was for the rare and subtle thought and for deliberate comedy.

Walkley in 1921

Walkley drew on these articles for his three volumes of essays, Pastiche and Prejudice (1921), More Prejudice (1923), and Still More Prejudice (1925). It was a matter of pride to Walkley that Shaw dedicated Man and Superman to him, crediting him in the dedication with suggesting a Don Juan play.

In a biographical article on Walkley H H Child writes:

Walkley's view of criticism may best be understood from his book Dramatic Criticism. He professed himself an "impressionist", one whose task was to estimate and analyse his own sensations in the presence of a work of art, not to judge it by rule. … This, especially in his earlier years, was of great help to English drama, which was then beginning a new period and breaking free from certain conventions of dramatic form and content. In particular Walkley's welcome of Ibsen, not as a moralist or reformer, but as a great artist in play-making, did much to counteract the abuse and the misunderstanding with which Ibsen's plays were at first received in London.

As he grew older Walkley became less enamoured of avant garde drama, finding well-made plays – French in particular – more congenial. The Times obituarist said of him, "he had his own touchstone of reality, and he liked anything that made for reality as he saw it. Vagueness and extravagance in life and in art were foreign to a mind whose ultimate test was always aesthetic." Walkley generally confined his reviewing to West End productions. His younger colleague James Agate told of a critic who, pressed by his editor to review a production in Barnes, all of six miles from central London, replied, "Sir, I respectfully submit that I am your dramatic critic for London, not for Asia Minor." Agate did not name him, but according to the publisher Rupert Hart-Davis it was Walkley.

After a short illness Walkley died, aged seventy, at his country house at Brightlingsea in Essex.

== See also ==
- Arthur Wing Pinero
- St. John Hankin
- William Archer

== Notes and references ==
Notes

== Sources ==
- Agate, James (1946). The Contemporary Theatre 1944 and 1945. London: Harrap. OCLC 1597751.
- Hart-Davis, Rupert; George Lyttelton (1985) [1978 and 1979]. Lyttelton/Hart-Davis Letters Vol 1 (1955-6 letters) and Vol 2 (1956-7 letters). London: John Murray. ISBN 0-7195-4246-4.
