= Malcolm Sargent =

English conductor (1895–1967)

External audio
- Shellac recordings with Malcolm Sargent in the Online Archive of the Österreichische Mediathek

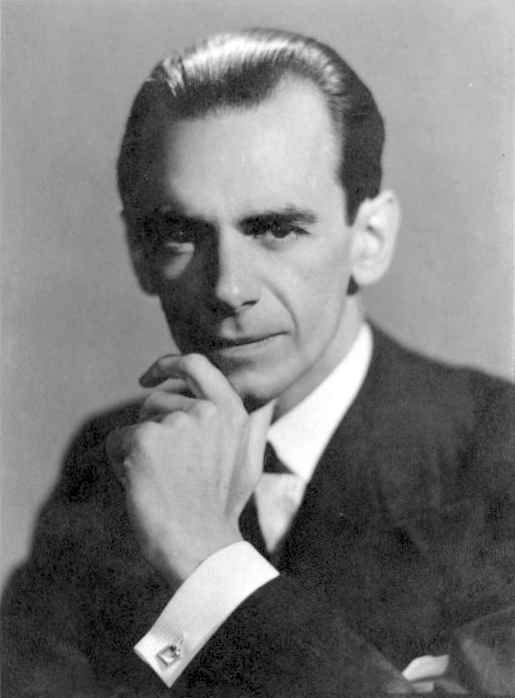
Malcolm Sargent in 1941

Sir Harold Malcolm Watts Sargent (29 April 1895 – 3 October 1967) was an English conductor, organist and composer widely regarded as Britain's leading conductor of choral works. The musical ensembles with which he was associated included the Ballets Russes, the Huddersfield Choral Society, the Royal Choral Society, the D'Oyly Carte Opera Company, and the London Philharmonic, Hallé, Liverpool Philharmonic, BBC Symphony and Royal Philharmonic orchestras. Sargent was held in high esteem by choirs and instrumental soloists, but because of his high standards and a statement that he made in a 1936 interview disputing musicians' rights to tenure, his relationship with orchestral players was often uneasy. Despite this, he was co-founder of the London Philharmonic, was the first conductor of the Liverpool Philharmonic as a full-time ensemble, and played an important part in saving the Royal Philharmonic Orchestra from disbandment in the 1960s.

As chief conductor of London's internationally famous summer music festival the Henry Wood Promenade Concerts ("the Proms") from 1947 to 1967, Sargent was one of the best-known English conductors. When he took over the Proms, he and two assistants conducted the two-month season between them. By the time he died, he was assisted by a large international roster of guest conductors.

At the outbreak of the Second World War, Sargent turned down an offer of a musical directorship in Australia and returned to Britain to bring music to as many people as possible as his contribution to national morale. His fame extended beyond the concert hall: to the British public, he was a familiar broadcaster in BBC radio discussion programmes, and generations of Gilbert and Sullivan devotees have known his recordings of the most popular Savoy Operas. He toured widely throughout the world and was noted for his skill as a conductor, his championship of British composers, and his debonair appearance, which won him the nickname "Flash Harry".

== Life and career ==
Sargent's parents lived in Stamford, Lincolnshire, but he was born in Ashford, in Kent while his mother was staying with a family friend. He was the elder child and only son of Henry Edward Sargent (1863–1936) (Note: Sargent's biographer Richard Aldous states that Henry Sargent was born after 1864, but the England and Wales, Civil Registration Birth Index shows 1863 as the year of birth.) and his wife Agnes, née Hall (1860–1942). Henry Sargent was chief clerk at a Stamford coal merchant, an amateur musician and local church organist; before their marriage his wife had been the matron of the Stamford High School for Girls. The young Sargent won a scholarship to Stamford School, where he was a pupil from 1907 to 1912. At the same time he was preparing for the musical career his father envisaged for him. He studied piano and organ, and joined the local amateur operatic society, making his stage debut in The Mikado aged 13 and conducting for the first time the following year when the regular conductor was unavailable. On leaving school, Sargent was articled to Haydn Keeton, organist of Peterborough Cathedral, and was one of the last musicians to be trained in that traditional way. At the age of 16 he gained his diploma as Associate of the Royal College of Organists, and at 18 he was awarded the degree of Bachelor of Music by the University of Durham.

=== Early career ===
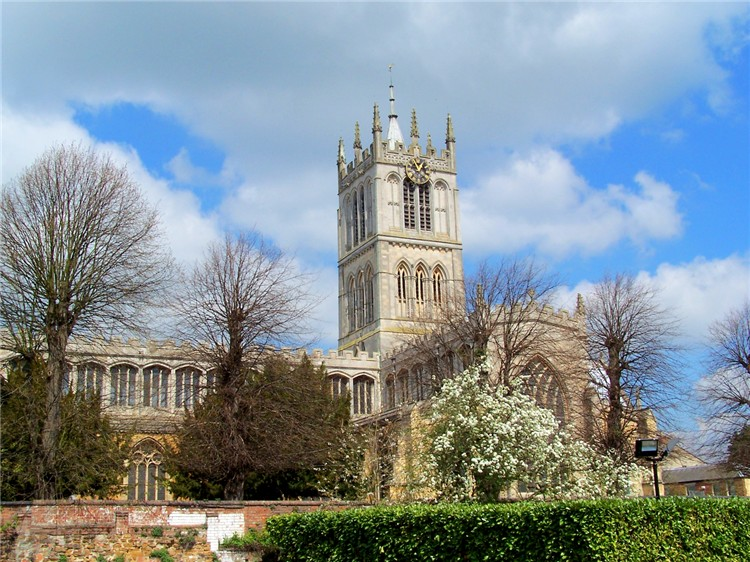
St Mary's Church, Melton Mowbray, the largest parish church in Leicestershire, where Sargent served as organist

Sargent worked first as an organist at St Mary's Church, Melton Mowbray, Leicestershire, from 1914 to 1924, except for eight months in 1918 when he served as a private in the Durham Light Infantry during the First World War. He was chosen for the organist post over more than 150 other applicants. In addition to his organ playing he worked on many musical projects in Leicester, Melton Mowbray and Stamford, where he not only conducted but also produced the operas of Gilbert and Sullivan and others for amateur societies. The Prince of Wales and his entourage often hunted in Leicestershire and watched the annual Gilbert and Sullivan productions there, together with the Duke of York and other members of the Royal Family. At the age of 24 Sargent became England's youngest Doctor of Music, with a degree from Durham.

Sargent's break came when Sir Henry Wood visited the De Montfort Hall, Leicester, early in 1921 with the Queen's Hall orchestra. As it was his custom to commission a piece from a local composer, Wood invited Sargent to write a piece. Sargent did so – a tone poem, An Impression on a Windy Day, a seven-minute orchestral allegro impetuoso. He completed it too late for Wood to have enough time to learn it, and Wood called on him to conduct the first performance. Wood recognised not only the worth of the piece but also Sargent's talent as a conductor and gave him the chance to make his London debut, conducting the work at the Proms – the annual season of the Henry Wood Promenade Concerts – in the Queen's Hall on 11 October of the same year.

Sargent as composer attracted favourable notice (Note: The Observer's music critic wrote that the piece "offers little or nothing that is actually new, but is an artistic, well-constructed piece of orchestral writing, enjoyable in itself, and cheering in its promise of even better things to come in future". The Musical Times called it "a vigorous piece of mood painting with a genuine open-air feeling [which] deserves to be heard again".) in a Prom season when other composer-conductors included Gustav Holst with his Planets suite, (Note: Other composer-conductors in the 1921 season included Elgar, Vaughan Williams, Arthur Bliss, Eric Coates, Frank Bridge, and Ethel Smyth.) and the next year Wood included Sargent's "Nocturne and Scherzo" in the Proms programme, also conducted by the composer. Sargent was invited to conduct his Impression again in the 1923 season, but it was as a conductor that he made the greater impact. On the advice of Wood, among others, he soon abandoned composition in favour of conducting. He founded the amateur Leicester Symphony Orchestra in 1922, which he continued to conduct until 1939. Under Sargent, the orchestra's prestige grew until it was able to obtain such top-flight soloists as Alfred Cortot, Artur Schnabel, Solomon, Guilhermina Suggia and Benno Moiseiwitsch. Moiseiwitsch gave Sargent piano lessons without charge, judging him talented enough to make a successful career as a concert pianist, but Sargent chose a conducting career. At the instigation of Wood and Adrian Boult he became a lecturer at the Royal College of Music in London in 1923.

=== National fame ===
D'Oyly Carte's new production of The Mikado conducted by Sargent in 1926

In the 1920s Sargent became one of the best-known English conductors. In London, he succeeded Boult as conductor of the Robert Mayer Concerts for Children from 1924 to 1939. In the provinces he conducted the British National Opera Company in The Mastersingers on tour in 1924 and 1925, winning praise from music critics around the country. In 1925 he conducted his first broadcast performance for the BBC: more than two thousand more followed over the next four decades.

In 1926 Sargent began an association with the D'Oyly Carte Opera Company that lasted, on and off, for the rest of his life. He conducted London seasons at the Prince's Theatre in 1926 and the newly rebuilt Savoy Theatre in 1929–30. He was criticised by The Times for allegedly adding "gags" to the Gilbert and Sullivan scores, although the writer praised the crispness of the ensemble, the "musicalness" of the performance and the beauty of the overture. Rupert D'Oyly Carte wrote to the paper stating that Sargent had worked from Arthur Sullivan's manuscript scores and had merely brought out the "details of the orchestration" exactly as Sullivan had written them. Some of the principal cast members objected to Sargent's fast tempi, at least at first. The D'Oyly Carte seasons brought Sargent's name to a wider public with an early BBC radio relay of The Mikado in 1926 heard by up to eight million people. The Evening Standard commented that this was "probably the largest audience that has ever heard anything at one time in the history of the world".

In 1927 Sergei Diaghilev engaged Sargent to conduct for the Ballets Russes, sharing the conducting with Igor Stravinsky and Sir Thomas Beecham. In 1928 Sargent was appointed conductor of the Royal Choral Society; he retained this post for four decades until his death. The society was famous in the 1920s and 1930s for staged performances of Samuel Coleridge-Taylor's Hiawatha at the Royal Albert Hall, a work with which Sargent's name soon became synonymous.

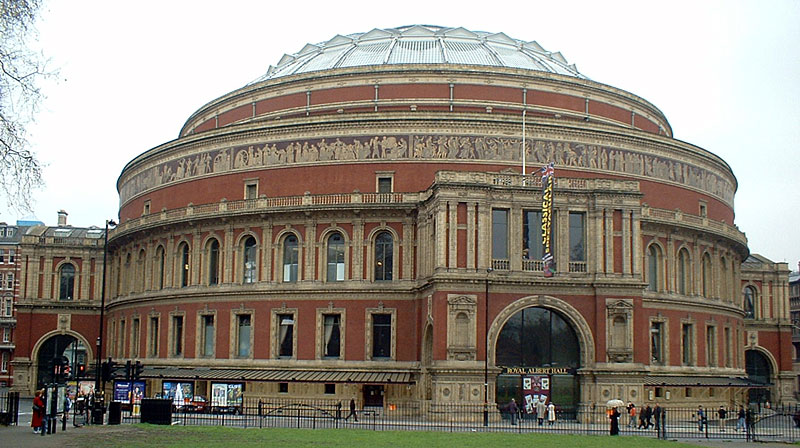
Royal Albert Hall

Elizabeth Courtauld, wife of the industrialist and art collector Samuel Courtauld, promoted a popular series of subscription concerts beginning in 1929 and on Schnabel's advice engaged Sargent as chief conductor, with guest conductors including Bruno Walter, Otto Klemperer and Stravinsky. The Courtauld-Sargent concerts, as they became known, were aimed at people who had not previously attended concerts. They attracted large audiences, bringing Sargent's name before another section of the public. In addition to the core repertory, Sargent introduced new works by Bliss, Honegger, Kodály, Martinů, Prokofiev, Szymanowski and Walton, among others. At first, the London Symphony Orchestra was engaged for these concerts, but the orchestra, a self-governing co-operative, refused to replace key players whom Sargent considered sub-standard. As a result, in conjunction with Beecham, Sargent set about establishing a new orchestra, the London Philharmonic.

In these years Sargent tackled a wide repertoire, recording much of it, but he was particularly noted for performances of choral pieces, most notably Handel's Messiah, performed with large choruses and orchestras. He joked that his career was based on "the two M's – Messiah and Mikado". He promoted British music, as he would throughout his career, and conducted the premieres of At the Boar's Head (1925) by Holst; Hugh the Drover (1924); (Note: This was the work's first professional performance; Sargent conducted the BNOC company. A private student performance had been given at the Royal College of Music a week before the official premiere. Vaughan Williams praised Sargent for holding the under-rehearsed BNOC production together; he said the conductor "saved it from disaster every few bars and pulled the chestnuts out of the fire in a miraculous way".) Sir John in Love (1929) by Vaughan Williams; and Walton's cantata Belshazzar's Feast (at the Leeds Triennial Festival of 1931). The chorus for the last of these found Walton's music difficult, but Sargent engaged them with it, telling them they were helping to make musical history, and reminding them that Berlioz's Requiem and Elgar's The Dream of Gerontius had been considered impossible at first. He drew from them and the LSO what The Times described as "a performance of unflagging energy and amazing volume of tone under Dr. Malcolm Sargent".

=== Difficult years and war years ===
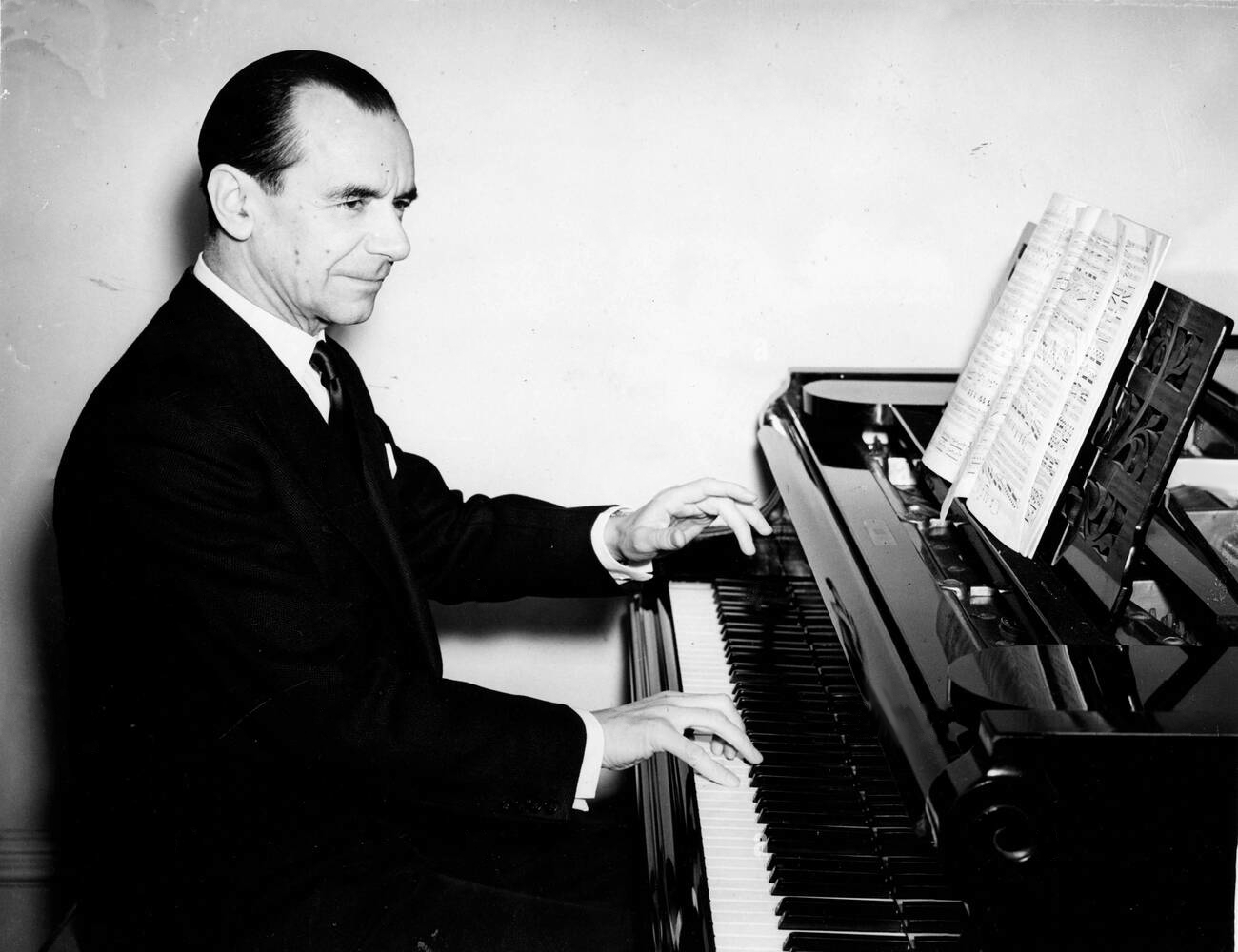
Sargent in 1953

In October 1932 Sargent suffered a near-fatal attack of tuberculosis. For almost two years he was unable to work, and it was only later in the 1930s that he returned to the concert scene. In 1936 he conducted his first opera at Covent Garden, Gustave Charpentier's Louise. He did not conduct opera there again until 1954, with Walton's Troilus and Cressida, although he did conduct the incidental music for a dramatisation of The Pilgrim's Progress given at the Royal Opera House in 1948.

Although Sargent was popular with choral singers, his relations with orchestras were sometimes strained. After giving a Daily Telegraph interview in 1936 in which he said that an orchestral musician did not deserve a "job for life" and should "give of his lifeblood with every bar he plays," Sargent lost much favour with orchestral musicians. They were particularly aggrieved because of their support of him during his long illness, and thereafter he faced frequent hostility from British orchestras.

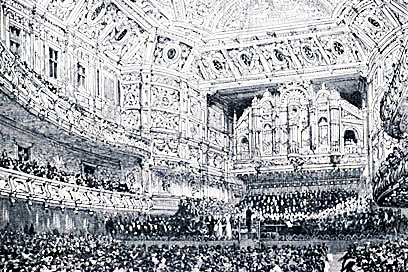
Interior of the Queen's Hall

Being popular in Australia with players as well as the public, Sargent made three lengthy tours of Australia and New Zealand, beginning in 1936. He was on the point of accepting a permanent appointment with the Australian Broadcasting Corporation when, at the outbreak of the Second World War, he felt it his duty to return to his country, resisting strong pressure from the Australian media for him to stay. During the war, Sargent directed the Hallé Orchestra in Manchester (1939–1942) and the Liverpool Philharmonic (1942–1948) and became a popular BBC Home Service radio broadcaster, particularly in the discussion programme The Brains Trust. He helped boost public morale during the war by extensive concert tours around the country conducting for nominal fees. On one occasion, an air raid interrupted a performance of Beethoven's Symphony No. 7. Sargent stopped the orchestra, reassured the audience that they were safer inside the hall than fleeing outside, and resumed conducting. He later said that no orchestra had ever played so well and that no audience in his experience had ever listened so intently. In May 1941 he conducted the last performance heard in the Queen's Hall. Following an afternoon concert comprising the Enigma Variations and The Dream of Gerontius – praised by The Times as "performances of real distinction" – the hall was destroyed during an overnight incendiary raid.

In 1945 Arturo Toscanini invited Sargent to conduct the NBC Symphony Orchestra. In four concerts Sargent chose to present all English music, with the exception of Sibelius's Symphony No. 1 and Dvořák's Symphony No. 7. Two concertos, Walton's Viola Concerto with William Primrose, and Elgar's Violin Concerto with Yehudi Menuhin, were programmed as part of these concerts. Menuhin judged Sargent's conducting of the latter "the next best to Elgar in this work".

=== The Proms ===
Sargent was made a Knight Bachelor in the 1947 Birthday Honours for services to music. He performed in numerous English-speaking countries during the post-war years and continued to promote British composers, conducting the premieres of Walton's opera, Troilus and Cressida (1954), and Vaughan Williams's Symphony No. 9 (1958).

The best-known public image of Sargent, presiding at the Proms

Sargent was a dominant figure at the Proms in the post-war era. He was chief conductor of the Proms from 1947 until his death in 1967, taking part in 514 concerts. A 1947 Prom under his baton was the first concert to be televised in Britain. As conductor of the Proms, Sargent gained his widest fame, making the "Last Night" of each season into a high-ratings broadcast celebration aimed at ordinary audiences, a popular, theatrical flag-waving extravaganza presided over by himself. He was noted for his witty addresses in which he good-naturedly chided the noisy promenaders. In his programmes he often conducted choral music and music by British composers, but his range was broad: the BBC's official history of the Proms lists selected programmes from this period showing Sargent conducting works by Bach, Sibelius, Dvořák, Berlioz, Rachmaninoff, Rimsky-Korsakov, Richard Strauss and Kodály in three successive programmes. During his chief conductorship, prestigious foreign conductors and orchestras began to perform regularly at the Proms. In his first season in charge, Sargent and two assistant conductors conducted all the concerts among them; by 1966 there were Sargent and 25 other conductors. Those making their Prom debuts in the Sargent years included Carlo Maria Giulini, Georg Solti, Leopold Stokowski, Rudolf Kempe, Pierre Boulez and Bernard Haitink.

Sargent was chief conductor of the BBC Symphony Orchestra from 1950 to 1957, succeeding Boult. He was not the BBC's first choice, but John Barbirolli and Rafael Kubelik turned the post down, and it went to Sargent, despite reservations about his commitment. Unlike Boult he refused to join the staff of the BBC and remained a freelance, accepting other engagements as he pleased. The historian of the BBC Asa Briggs has written, "Sargent sometimes ruffled the orchestra in a way that Boult had never done. Indeed there were many people inside the BBC who profoundly regretted Boult's departure." Briggs adds that Sargent was the target of criticism from the BBC's own Music Department for "not devoting enough time to the orchestra". The music journalist Norman Lebrecht goes so far as to say that Sargent "almost wrecked" the BBC orchestra. The orchestra objected to his "autocratic and prima-donna attitude towards orchestral players" and flatly refused to accede to his demand that they all stand up when he came on to the platform. He rapidly became equally unpopular with the BBC music department, ignoring its agenda and pursuing his own. A senior BBC manager wrote:

Except when a Barbirolli or a Kletzki has been in charge for a few days, the Orchestra is inferior, as an artistic instrument, to the Hallé or Philharmonia ... [Sargent] is indifferent to the morale and welfare of the Orchestra and to the individual temperaments of his players as artists or as human beings.

It did not help that Sargent was universally acknowledged to be at his finest in choral music. His reputation in big works for chorus and orchestra such as The Dream of Gerontius, Hiawatha and Belshazzar's Feast was unrivalled, and his large-scale performances of Handel oratorios were assured packed houses. But his regular programming of such works did nothing to lift the spirits of the BBC SO: orchestral musicians regarded playing the instrumental accompaniment for large choirs as drudgery.

Although there were complaints within the BBC, there was praise from outside it for Sargent's work with the orchestra. His biographer Reid wrote, "Sargent's liveliness and drive soon gave BBC playing a gloss and briskness which had not been conspicuous before". Another biographer, Aldous, wrote, "Everywhere Sargent and the orchestra performed there were ovations, laurel wreaths and terrific reviews." The orchestra's reputation both in Britain and internationally grew during Sargent's tenure. Briggs records that conductor had "great moments of triumph ... both at festivals overseas and during the Proms". In the 1950s and 1960s he made many recordings with the BBC Symphony, as well as other ensembles, as described below. In this period, also, he conducted the concerts that opened the Royal Festival Hall in 1951 and returned to the D'Oyly Carte Opera Company for the summer 1951 Festival of Britain season at the Savoy Theatre and the winter 1961–62 and 1963–64 seasons at the Savoy. In August 1956 the BBC announced that he would be replaced as Chief Conductor of the BBC orchestra by Rudolf Schwarz. Sargent was given the title of "Chief Guest Conductor" and he remained Conductor-in-Chief of the Proms.

=== Overseas and last years ===
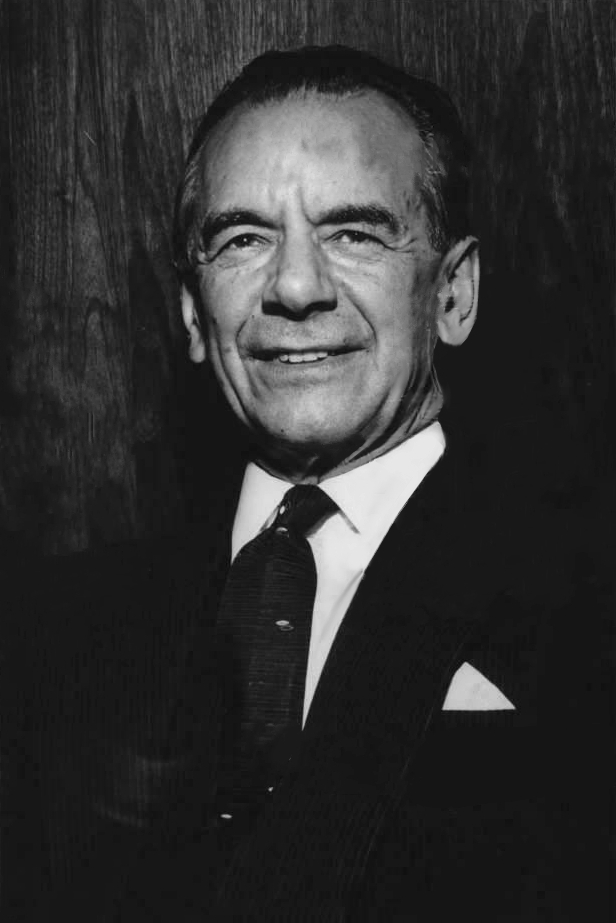
Sargent in 1960

Sargent made two tours of South America. In 1950 he conducted in Buenos Aires, Montevideo, Rio de Janeiro and Santiago. His programmes included Vaughan Williams's London and 6th Symphonies; Haydn's Symphony No. 88, Beethoven's Symphony No. 8, Mozart's Jupiter symphony, Schubert's 5th, Brahms's 2nd and 4th and Sibelius's 5th symphonies, Elgar's Serenade for Strings, Britten's The Young Person's Guide to the Orchestra, Strauss's Till Eulenspiegel's Merry Pranks, Walton's Viola Concerto and Dvořák's Cello Concerto with Pierre Fournier. In 1952 Sargent conducted in all the above-mentioned cities and also in Lima. Half his repertory on that tour consisted of British music and included Delius, Vaughan Williams, Britten, Walton and Handel.

When the Royal Philharmonic Orchestra was in danger of extinction after Beecham's death in 1961, Sargent played a major part in saving it, doing much to win back the good opinion of orchestral players that he had lost because of his 1936 interview. In the 1960s, he toured Russia, the United States, Canada, Turkey, Israel, India, the Far East and Australia. By the mid-1960s his health began to deteriorate. His final conducting appearances were on 6 and 8 July 1967, with the Chicago Symphony Orchestra at the Ravinia Festival. On 6 July he conducted Holst's The Perfect Fool, Wieniawski's Second Violin Concerto with Itzhak Perlman, and Vaughan Williams's A London Symphony. On 8 July he conducted Vaughan Williams's Overture The Wasps, Delius's The Walk to the Paradise Garden, Prokofiev's Piano Concerto No. 4 with David Bar-Illan, and Sibelius's Symphony No. 2.

Sargent underwent surgery in July 1967 for pancreatic cancer and made a valedictory appearance at the end of the Last Night of the Proms in September that year, handing over the baton to his successor, Colin Davis. He died two weeks later, at the age of 72. He was buried in Stamford cemetery alongside members of his family.

=== Musical reputation and repertoire ===
Toscanini, Beecham and many others regarded Sargent as the finest choral conductor in the world. Even orchestral musicians gave him credit: the principal violist of the BBC Symphony Orchestra wrote of him, "He is able to instil into the singers a life and efficiency they never dreamed of. You have only to see the eyes of a choral society screwing into him like hundreds of gimlets to understand what he means to them." Boult thought him "a great all-rounder", but added, "he never developed his potentialities, which were enormous, simply because he didn't think hard enough about music – he never troubled to improve on a successful interpretation. He was too interested in other things, and not single-minded enough about music."

Although orchestral players resented Sargent for much of his career after the 1936 interview, instrumental soloists generally liked working with him. The cellist Pierre Fournier called him a "guardian angel" and compared him favourably with George Szell and Herbert von Karajan. Artur Schnabel, Jascha Heifetz and Yehudi Menuhin thought similarly highly of him. Cyril Smith wrote in his autobiography, "... he seems to sense what the pianist wants of the music even before he begins to play it. ... He has an incredible speed of mind, and it has always been a great joy, as well as a rare professional experience, to work with him." For this reason, among others, Sargent was continually in demand as a conductor for concertos.

The Times obituary said Sargent "was of all British conductors in his day the most widely esteemed by the lay public ... a fluent, attractive pianist, a brilliant score-reader, a skilful and effective arranger and orchestrator ... as a conductor his stick technique was regarded by many as the most accomplished and reliable in the world. ... [H]is taste ... was moulded by the Victorian cathedral tradition into which he was born." It commented that, in his later years, his interpretations of the standard classical and romantic repertoire were "prepared ... down to the last detail" but sometimes "unexuberant", though his performances of "the music composed within his lifetime ... remained lucid and continually compelling". The flute player Gerald Jackson wrote, "I feel that [Walton] conducts his own music as well as anyone else, with the possible exception of Sargent, who of course introduced and always makes a big thing of Belshazzar's Feast."

The composers whose works Sargent regularly conducted included, from the eighteenth century, Bach, Handel, Gluck, Mozart and Haydn; and from the nineteenth century, Beethoven, Berlioz, Schubert, Schumann, Mendelssohn, Brahms, Wagner, Tchaikovsky, Smetana, Sullivan and Dvořák. From the twentieth century, British composers in his repertoire included Bliss, Britten, Delius, Elgar (a favourite, especially Elgar's choral works The Dream of Gerontius, The Apostles and The Kingdom and symphonies), Holst, Tippett, Vaughan Williams and Walton. With the exception of Alban Berg's Violin Concerto, Sargent avoided the works of the Second Viennese School but programmed works by Bartók, Dohnányi, Hindemith, Honegger, Kodály, Martinů, Poulenc, Prokofiev, Rachmaninoff, Shostakovich, Sibelius, Strauss, Stravinsky and Szymanowski.

== Personal life, reputation and legacy ==
=== Private life ===
In September 1923 Sargent married Eileen Laura Harding Horne (1898–1977). (Note: Aldous, citing local gossip, maintains that Eileen was of lower social status than Sargent, but her family had servants, including a butler and a cook, a London house in South Kensington and a country house in Suffolk.) She was the younger daughter of Frederick William Horne – a prosperous miller, farmer, coal merchant and carter – and the niece of Evangeline Astley Cooper of Hambleton Hall in Rutland, where she lived in the early 1920s. Sargent was a guest there in the same period, and his name occurs alongside hers in local press reports of social gatherings such as hunt balls. When they married, the press headlined her name rather than that of her still little-known husband. The couple were married at Drinkstone Parish Church, the service conducted by the bride's uncle, who, as her grandfather had been, was rector there. By 1926, the couple had two children, a daughter, Pamela, who died of polio in 1944, and a son Peter. Sargent was much affected by his daughter's death, and his recording of Elgar's The Dream of Gerontius in 1945 was an expression of his grief. The marriage was unhappy and ended in divorce in 1946. Before, during and after his marriage, Sargent was a continual womaniser, which he did not deny. Among his reported affairs were long-standing ones with Diana Bowes-Lyon, Princess Marina and Edwina Mountbatten. According to the music critic Michael Kennedy, Sargent was "a terror to women". In a letter to George Lyttelton, Rupert Hart-Davis recalled that a young woman he once met at a party approached him with a request: "Promise me that whatever happens I shan't have to go home alone in a taxi with Malcolm Sargent".

Away from music, Sargent was elected a member of The Literary Society, a dining club founded in 1807 by William Wordsworth and others. He was also a member of the Beefsteak Club, for which his proposer was Sir Edward Elgar, the Garrick, and the long-established and aristocratic White's and Pratt's clubs. His public service appointments included the joint presidency of the London Union of Youth Clubs, and the presidency of the Royal Society for the Prevention of Cruelty to Animals.

Despite Sargent's vanities and rivalries, he had many friends. Sir Thomas Armstrong in a 1994 broadcast interview stressed that Sargent "had many good generous virtues; he was kind to many people, and I loved him ...". Nevertheless, even friends such as Rupert Hart-Davis, secretary of the Literary Society, considered him a "bounder", and the composer Dame Ethel Smyth called him a "cad". Yet despite his philandering and ambition, Sargent was a deeply religious man all his life and was comforted on his deathbed by visits from the Anglican Archbishop of York, Donald Coggan and the Roman Catholic Archbishop of Westminster, Cardinal Heenan. He also received telephone calls from Queen Elizabeth and Prince Charles, and had a reconciliation with his son, Peter, from whom he had been estranged.

=== "Flash Harry" ===
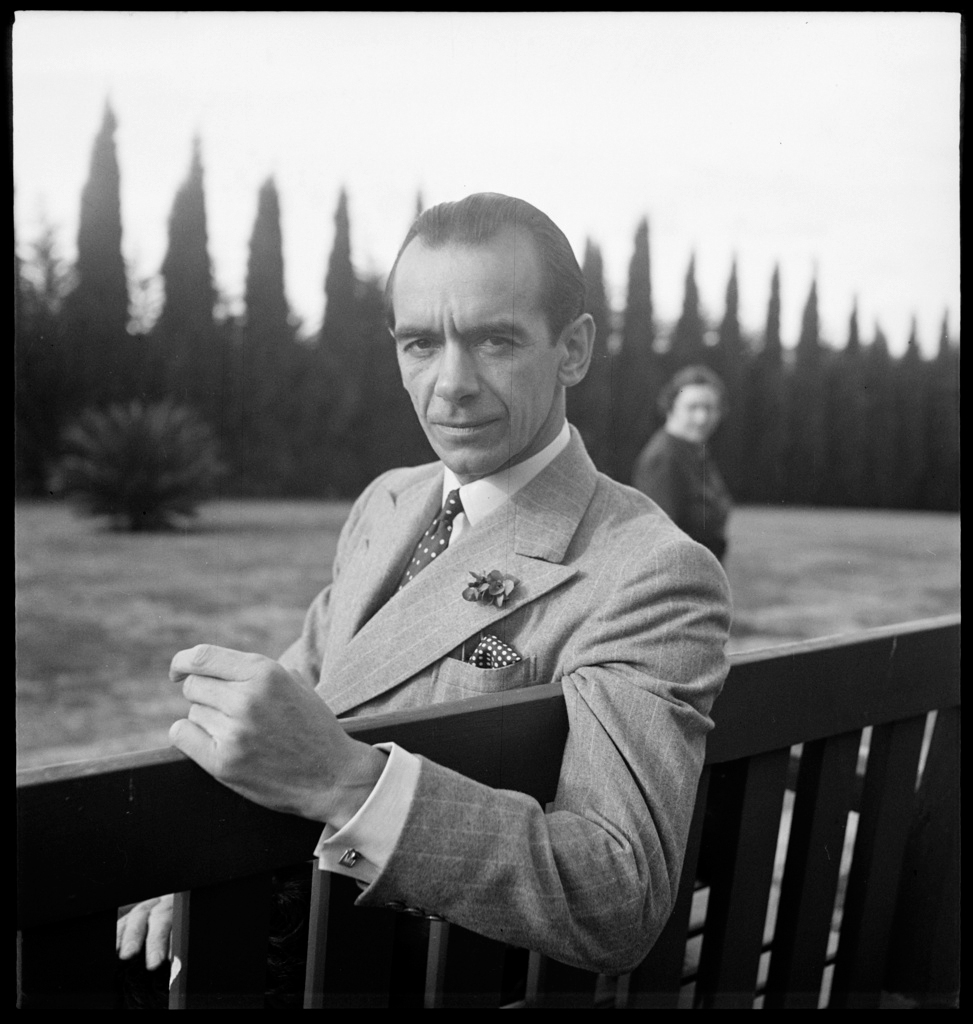
Sargent in Sydney, 1936

A number of purported explanations have been advanced for Sargent's nickname, "Flash Harry". Reid opines that it "was first in circulation among orchestral players before the war and that they used it in no spirit of adulation". It may have arisen from his impeccable and stylish appearance – he always wore a red or white carnation in his buttonhole (the carnation is now the symbol of the school named for him). This was perhaps reinforced by his brisk tempi early in his career, and by a story about his racing from one recording session to another. Another explanation, that he was named after Ronald Searle's St Trinian's character "Flash Harry", is certainly wrong: Sargent's nickname was current long before the first appearance of the St Trinian's character in 1954. Sargent's devoted fans, the Promenaders, used the nickname in an approving sense, and shortened it to "Flash", though Sargent was not especially fond of the sobriquet, even thus modified.

Beecham and Sargent were allies from the early days of the London Philharmonic to Beecham's final months when they were planning joint concerts. They even happened to share the same birthday. When Sargent was incapacitated by tuberculosis in 1933, Beecham conducted a performance of Messiah at the Albert Hall to raise money to support his younger colleague. Sargent enjoyed Beecham's company, and took in good part his quips, such as his reference to the image-conscious young conductor Herbert von Karajan as "a kind of musical Malcolm Sargent" and, on learning that Sargent's car was caught in rifle fire in Palestine, "I had no idea the Arabs were so musical." Beecham declared that Sargent "is the greatest choirmaster we have ever produced ... he makes the buggers sing like blazes". And on another occasion he said that Sargent was "the most expert of all our conductors – myself excepted of course".

=== Honours and memorials ===
In addition to his own doctorate from Durham, Sargent was awarded honorary degrees by the Universities of Oxford and Liverpool and by the Royal Academy of Music, the Royal College of Organists, the Royal College of Music and the Swedish Academy of Music. He was awarded the highest honour of the Royal Philharmonic Society, its Gold Medal, in 1959. Foreign honours included the Order of the Polar Star (Sweden), 1956; the Order of the White Rose (Finland), 1965; and Chevalier of France's Légion d'honneur, 1967.

After his death Sargent was commemorated in a variety of ways. His memorial service in Westminster Abbey in October 1967 was attended by 3,000 people including the royalty of three countries, official representatives from France, South Africa, and Malaysia, and notables as diverse as Princess Marina of Kent; Bridget D'Oyly Carte; Pierre Boulez; Larry Adler; Elgar's daughter; Beecham's widow; Douglas Fairbanks Junior; Léon Goossens; the Master of the Queen's Music; the Secretary of London Zoo; and representatives of the London orchestras and of the Promenaders. Colin Davis and the BBC Chorus and Symphony Orchestra performed the music.

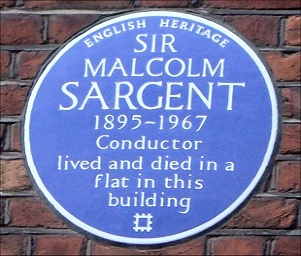
Plaque outside the Albert Hall Mansions

Since 1968, the year after Sargent's death, the Proms have begun on a Friday evening rather than as previously a Saturday, and in memory of Sargent's choral work, a large-scale choral piece is customarily given. Beyond the world of music, a school and a charity were named after him: the Malcolm Sargent Primary School in Stamford and the Malcolm Sargent Cancer Fund for Children. Merging with another charity (Cancer and Leukaemia in Childhood) in 2005, it was renamed CLIC Sargent. In 2021 the charity was renamed again as Young Lives vs Cancer; it is the UK's leading children's cancer charity. In 1980 the Royal Mail put the image of Sargent on its 15p postage stamp in a series portraying British conductors. (Note: The other three conductors pictured were Wood (12p), Beecham (13½p) and Barbirolli (17½p).) At Albert Hall Mansions, next to the Albert Hall, where Sargent lived, there is a blue plaque placed in his memory.

== Recordings ==
Sargent's own composition, An Impression on a Windy Day, has been recorded for CD by the Royal Ballet Sinfonia conducted by Gavin Sutherland on the ASV label. Sargent's first recordings as a conductor, made for His Master's Voice in 1923 using the acoustic process, were of excerpts from Vaughan Williams's opera Hugh the Drover. In the early days of electrical recording, he took part in a pioneering live recording of extracts of Mendelssohn's Elijah at the Albert Hall with the Royal Choral Society.

Subsequently, in the recording studio, Sargent was most in demand to record English music, choral works and concertos. He recorded prolifically and worked with many orchestras, but made the most recordings (several dozen major pieces) with the BBC Symphony Orchestra (BBC), the London Symphony Orchestra (LSO), the New Symphony Orchestra of London, the Philharmonia Orchestra and the Royal Philharmonic Orchestra (RPO).

=== English music ===
Sargent conducted Gilbert and Sullivan recordings in four different decades. His early recordings with the D'Oyly Carte Opera Company for His Master's Voice included The Yeomen of the Guard (1928), The Pirates of Penzance (1929), Iolanthe (1930), H.M.S. Pinafore (1930), Patience (1930), Yeomen (excerpts 1931), Pirates (excerpts 1931), The Gondoliers (excerpts 1931), Ruddigore (1932) and Princess Ida (1932). More than 30 years later, for Decca, he recorded Yeomen (1964) and Princess Ida (1965) with the D'Oyly Carte company. In addition, between 1957 and 1963, Sargent recorded nine of the Gilbert and Sullivan operas for EMI, with the Glyndebourne Festival Chorus and soloists from the world of oratorio and grand opera. These were Trial by Jury, Pinafore, Pirates, Patience, Iolanthe, The Mikado, Ruddigore, Yeomen and The Gondoliers. According to the Gilbert and Sullivan scholar Marc Shepherd, "The [Glyndebourne] recordings' musical excellence is undisputed, but many listeners object to Sargent's lugubrious tempi and the singers' lack of feeling for the G&S idiom." Sargent used an orchestra of thirty-seven players at the Savoy Theatre (the same number as Sullivan), but sometimes added a few more when recording.

During the Second World War, Sargent and the Liverpool Philharmonic accompanied Albert Sammons, the dedicatee, in his 1944 recording of the Delius Violin Concerto. Later, in 1965, with Jacqueline du Pré, in her début recording, Sargent recorded Delius's Cello Concerto, coupled with the Songs of Farewell (1965). At the end of the war, Sargent turned to recording Elgar. The first of Sargent's two versions of Elgar's The Dream of Gerontius with Heddle Nash as tenor and the familiar Sargent pairing of the Huddersfield Choral Society and the Liverpool Philharmonic Orchestra was recorded in 1945, and six decades later was still regarded as a classic. Sargent was the conductor for Heifetz's 1949 recording of Elgar's Violin Concerto and Paul Tortelier's first recording of the Cello Concerto in 1954. He also recorded Elgar's Wand of Youth Suite No. 2, with the BBC; the Pomp and Circumstance Marches 1 and 4 with the LSO; and the Enigma Variations with the Philharmonia. He made two recordings of Holst's The Planets: a monaural version with the LSO for Decca (1950) and a stereo version with the BBC for EMI (1960). He also recorded shorter Holst pieces: The Perfect Fool ballet music and the Beni Mora suite.

In 1958 Sargent recorded Walton's Belshazzar's Feast, one of his specialities, which was reissued on CD in 1990 and again in 2004. He recorded Walton's Orb and Sceptre March and Façade Suites. He also made a stereo recording of Walton's First Symphony in the presence of the composer, but Walton privately preferred André Previn's recording, issued in January 1967, the same month as Sargent's. Of Vaughan Williams's shorter pieces, Sargent recorded, with the BBC in 1960, the Fantasia on a Theme by Thomas Tallis (which he also recorded with the Philharmonia), and with the LSO, Serenade to Music (1957; choral version) and Toward the Unknown Region. He recorded Vaughan Williams's overture The Wasps with the LSO.

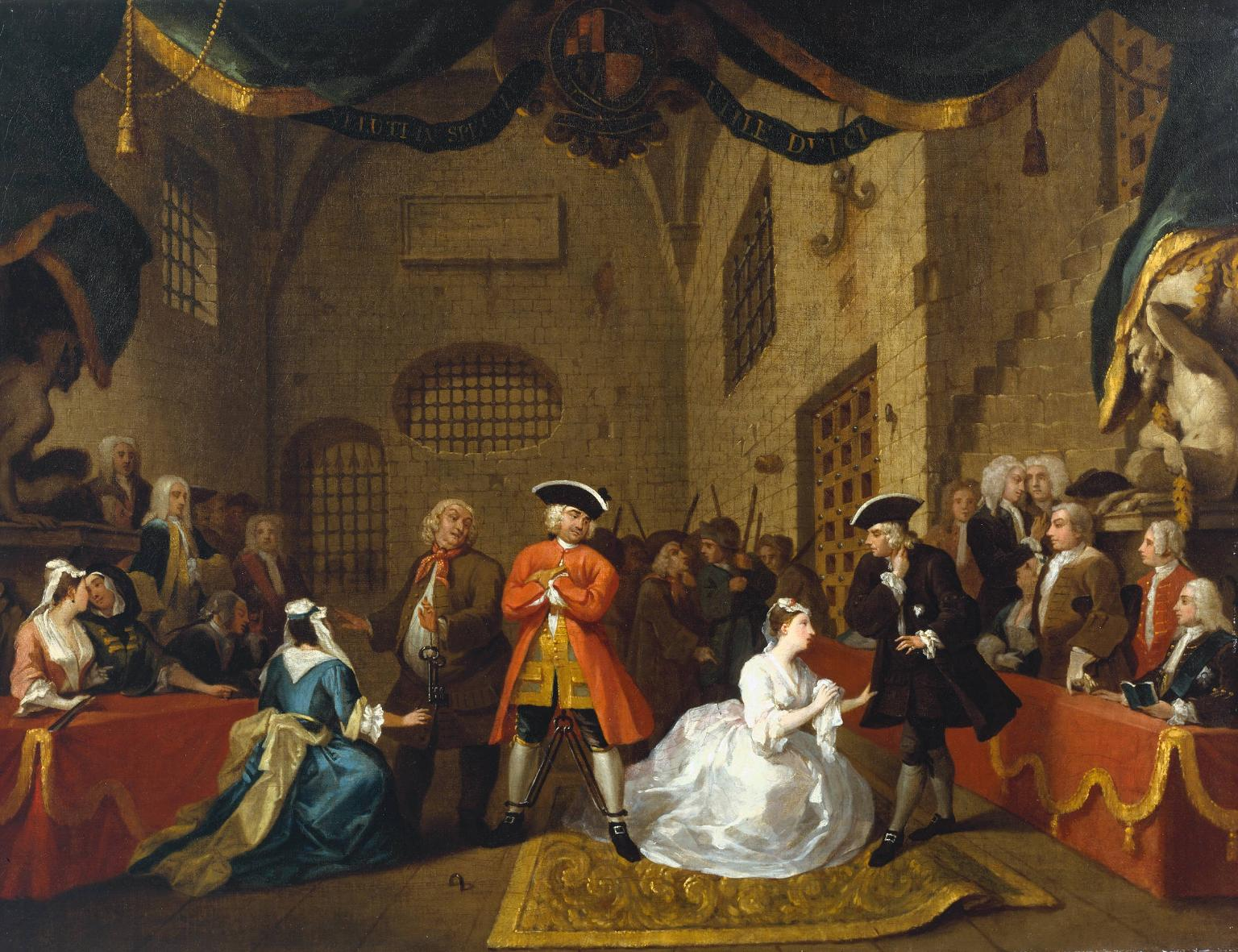
Painting based on The Beggar's Opera William Hogarth c. 1728

Although the heyday of live performances of Sargent's Coleridge-Taylor signature piece at the Albert Hall was by then long gone, Sargent, the Royal Choral Society and the Philharmonia made a stereo recording in 1962 of Hiawatha's Wedding Feast, which has been reissued on CD. In 1963, Sargent recorded Gay's The Beggar's Opera, one of his few operas on record other than Gilbert and Sullivan. This was also reissued on CD.

=== Other choral recordings ===
In addition to those choral pieces mentioned above, Sargent recorded Handel's Messiah four times, in 1946, 1954 1959 and 1964. (Note: An original American-issue 78rpm copy on Columbia Records of the 1946 version was sold for five-thousand US Dollars at an auction in Los Angeles in 2010) Though the advent of "authentic" period performance at first relegated Sargent's large scale and rescored versions to the shelf, they have been reissued and are now attracting favourable critical comment as being of historical interest in their own right. Sargent also conducted the Royal Liverpool Philharmonic and the Huddersfield Choral Society in recordings of Handel's Israel in Egypt and Mendelssohn's Elijah in 1947, both of which have been reissued on CD.

=== Concertos ===
Sargent was continually in demand as a conductor for concertos. In addition to the concertos noted above, other composers whose concertos he conducted on record, with soloists noted, include: Bach (Heifetz-Friedman, NSO), Bartók (Rostal, LSO), Beethoven (Oistrakh, Knushevitzky, Oborin, Philharmonia), Bliss (Trevor Barnard, Philharmonia), Bruch (Heifetz, LSO and NSO), Cimarosa (Léon Goossens, Royal Liverpool Philharmonic), Dvořák (Tortelier), Mendelssohn (Gioconda de Vito, LSO), Mozart (Heifetz, LSO), Rachmaninoff (Lympany, RPO), Rawsthorne (Curzon; Matthews, LSO), Rubbra (Matthews, LSO), Schumann (Pierre Fournier), Tchaikovsky (Ricci, NSO) and Vieuxtemps (Heifetz, NSO). Other soloists included Mstislav Rostropovich and Cyril Smith.

=== Other recordings ===
Neville Cardus said of Sargent's Beethoven, "I have heard performances which critics would have raved about had some conductor from Russia been responsible for them conducting them half as well and truthfully." Sargent recorded Beethoven's Fourth and Fifth Symphonies for Decca with Sidney Beer's National Symphony Orchestra. His 1940s accompaniments for Artur Schnabel in the piano concertos have been admired. A 1961 stereo recording of the Eroica Symphony has been reissued on CD. (Note: The Gramophone, April 2000, said of the CD: "It is good to have Sargent's 1961 Eroica to show how alive and sympathetic his Beethoven conducting was, especially when the RPO plays so well for him.") Sargent was an enthusiastic champion of Sibelius's music, even recording it with the Vienna Philharmonic when it was not part of their repertory. Their recordings of Finlandia, En saga, The Swan of Tuonela and the Karelia Suite were issued in 1963 and reissued on CD in 1993. Sargent and the BBC recorded the First, Second and Fifth Symphonies in 1956 and 1958 respectively, reissued on CD in 1989, as well as Pohjola's Daughter in 1959. He also recorded the Valse triste with the RLPO.

Sargent recorded a wide variety of other European composers, including Bach's Sinfonia from the Easter Oratorio, with Goossens and the RLPO; Chopin's Les Sylphides ballet suite (LPO); Grieg's Lyric Suite (National Symphony Orchestra); Haydn's Symphony No. 98 (LSO); Rachmaninoff's Paganini Rhapsody (Cyril Smith, RLPO) among others; and Wagner's "Prelude" from Das Rheingold and "Ride of the Valkyries" from Die Walküre. He also recorded Smetana's complete Má vlast cycle with the RPO in 1964. With the Royal Opera Orchestra he recorded, among other pieces, Gioachino Rossini's William Tell and La Boutique Fantasque, Prokofiev's Sinfonia Concertante, and Schubert's Unfinished Symphony, Rosamunde and Overture Zauberharfe.

With the LSO, he recorded Mussorgsky's Pictures at an Exhibition and Night on the Bare Mountain, Prokofiev's Symphony No. 5 and Lieutenant Kijé Suite, and Shostakovich's Symphony No. 9. With the Philharmonia, he recorded, among other things, Rachmaninoff's Rhapsody on a Theme of Paganini, Tchaikovsky's Variations on a Rococo Theme and Theme and Variations from Suite No. 3, and Dvořák's Symphonic Variations. With the BBC, he also recorded Rachmaninoff's Symphony No. 3, Handel's Water Music, which he also recorded with the RPO, Tchaikovsky's Symphony No. 5, Mendelssohn's A Midsummer Night's Dream incidental music, Humperdinck's overture to Hänsel und Gretel, and one of Britten's best known works, The Young Person's Guide to the Orchestra (1946, RLPO; 1958, BBC). He also conducted Britten's Simple Symphony with the RPO. Sargent narrated and conducted Instruments of the Orchestra, an educational film produced by the British government.

== Notes, references and sources ==
=== Sources ===
- Aldous, Richard (2001). Tunes of Glory: The Life of Malcolm Sargent. London: Hutchinson. ISBN 978-0-09-180131-1.
- Ayre, Leslie (1972). The Gilbert & Sullivan Companion. London: W H Allen. ISBN 978-0-396-06634-7.
- Briggs, Asa (1995). The History of Broadcasting in the United Kingdom. Oxford: Oxford University Press. ISBN 978-0-19-212967-3.
- Cox, David (1980). The Henry Wood Proms. London: BBC. ISBN 978-0-56-317697-8.
- Lyttelton, George; Rupert Hart-Davis (1978). Rupert Hart-Davis (ed.). The Lyttelton Hart-Davis Letters, Volume 1. London: John Murray. ISBN 978-0-7195-3478-2.
- Lyttelton, George; Rupert Hart-Davis (1981). Rupert Hart-Davis (ed.). The Lyttelton Hart-Davis Letters, Volume 3. London: John Murray. ISBN 978-0-7195-3770-7.
- Jackson, Gerald (1968). First Flute. London: Dent. OCLC 474189184.
- Jefferson, Alan (1979). Sir Thomas Beecham: A Centenary Tribute. London: Macdonald and Jane's. ISBN 978-0-35-404205-5.
- Kennedy, Michael (1989). Portrait of Walton. Oxford: Oxford University Press. ISBN 978-0-19-315418-6.
- Kenyon, Nicholas (1981). The BBC Symphony Orchestra – The First Fifty Years, 1930–1980. London: British Broadcasting Corporation. ISBN 978-0-56-317617-6.
- Lebrecht, Norman (1991). The Maestro Myth: Great Conductors in Pursuit of Power. London: Simon and Schuster. ISBN 978-0-67-171018-7.
- Maloney, Alison (2018). Last Night of the Proms: An Official Miscellany. London: BBC. ISBN 978-1-47-353131-4.
- March, Ivan, ed. (2005). Penguin Guide to CDs. London: Penguin. ISBN 978-0-14-102262-8.
- Moore, Jerrold Northrop (1982). Philharmonic. London: Hutchinson. ISBN 978-0-09-147300-6.
- Morrison, Richard (2004). Orchestra. London: Faber and Faber. ISBN 978-0-57-121584-3.
- Orga, Ates (1974). The Proms. Newton Abbot, London: David & Charles. ISBN 978-0-71-536679-0.
- Pound, Reginald (1959). Sir Henry Wood. London: Cassell. OCLC 603264427.
- Reid, Charles (1968). Malcolm Sargent: a biography. London: Hamish Hamilton Ltd. ISBN 978-0-24-191316-1.
- Sackville-West, Edward; Desmond Shawe-Taylor (1955). The Record Guide. London: Collins. OCLC 474839729.
- Sargent, Malcolm; Cooper, Martin (1962). The Outline of Music. London: Arco Publishing. OCLC 401043.
- Shore, Bernard (1938). The Orchestra Speaks. London: Longmans. ISBN 978-0-83-692570-8.
- Vaughan Williams, Ursula (1964). RVW: A Biography of Ralph Vaughan Williams. Oxford: Oxford University Press. ISBN 978-0-19-315411-7.
- Sir Malcolm Sargent: A Tribute. London: Daily Mirror Books. 1967. OCLC 3351498.
