= James Agate =

English diarist and theatre critic (1877–1947)

James Evershed Agate
- Agate in 1931
- Born: 9 September 1877; Pendleton, Greater Manchester, England
- Died: 6 June 1947 (aged 69); Holborn, London
- Education: Giggleswick School; Manchester Grammar School
- Occupations: Theatre & film critic, writer
- Spouse: Sidonie Joséphine Edmée Mourret-Castillon (m. 1918)
- Children: 0
- Parents: Charles James Agate (1832–1909) (father); Eulalie Julia Young (mother)

James Evershed Agate (9 September 1877 – 6 June 1947) was an English diarist and theatre critic between the two world wars. He took up journalism in his late twenties and was on the staff of The Manchester Guardian in 1907–1914. He later became a drama critic for The Saturday Review (1921–1923), The Sunday Times (1923–1947) and the BBC (1925–1932). The nine volumes of Agate's diaries and letters cover the British theatre of his time and non-theatrical interests such as sports, social gossip and private preoccupations with health and finances. He published three novels, translated a play briefly staged in London, and regularly published collections of theatre essays and reviews.

== Early years ==
Agate, the eldest child of Charles James Agate (1832–1909), a wholesale linen draper, and Eulalie Julia née Young, was born in Pendleton, near Manchester, England. His father had a keen interest in music and theatre and connections with them. Gustave Garcia, nephew to the prima donna Maria Malibran, was Charles's lifelong friend after they were apprenticed together in the cotton warehouse. Agate's mother, educated in Paris and Heidelberg, was an accomplished pianist. Through Agate's family ties with the active German artistic community in Manchester, he had much exposure to performance in his youth. In October 1912, Sarah Bernhardt visited the Agate home, an indication of the family's position in the local arts. Agate's only sister, May, later studied acting under Bernhardt in Paris.

After education at Giggleswick School and Manchester Grammar School, where he was academically outstanding, he did not go to a university, but went into his father's business, where he worked for 17 years. In his spare time he was a regular theatre goer, and admired and longed to emulate the critical writing of George Bernard Shaw in The Saturday Review. In 1906 he wrote a letter about drama to a local Manchester paper. The editor printed Agate's contribution and invited him to write a weekly theatre column. After a year Agate joined the Manchester Guardian's team of critics under the guidance of C. E. Montague. Even as a junior critic Agate did not hesitate to give bad notices to the leading figures of the English stage when he thought it justified. Within months of taking up his post, he wrote of Herbert Beerbohm Tree's performance as Richard II, "It was extraordinarily uninteresting, and it is amazing how badly a tragic part can fit an actor so fine as, in other directions, Mr. Tree undoubtedly is." Later, Agate was bested by Lilian Braithwaite, who responded to his assertion that she was "the second most beautiful woman in London" by replying, "I shall long cherish that, coming from our second-best theatre critic."

In his early twenties, Agate wrote a play, The After Years, which his biographer, Ivor Brown describes as "less than successfully realized". Another biographer, James Harding, said of Agate's subsequent attempts at fiction (a second play and three novels) that they are "of small import".

Agate volunteered in May 1915 at the age of thirty-seven for the Army Service Corps, and was posted to France. He had an arrangement to supply a series of open letters about his wartime experiences to Allan Monkhouse at The Manchester Guardian. These were published in his first book, L. of C. (Lines of Communication), of which a reviewer wrote, "Captain James E. Agate ranks as one of the first hundred thousand soldiers who have written a book about the war, but... one is sure there will be no other book like this one.... It is our old friend 'J. E. A.' at his irritating best in khaki." Agate's fluency in French and knowledge of horses found him a successful job as a hay procurer, described in the first volume of his Ego. His system of accounting for wartime hay purchases in a foreign land was eventually recognised by the War Office and made into an official handbook. Captain Agate's name was engraved on the Chapel-en-le-Frith War Memorial in Derbyshire. After L of C, Agate published a book of essays on the theatre, Buzz, Buzz! (1918). In the same year, while still serving in France, Agate married Sidonie Joséphine Edmée Mourret-Castillon, daughter of a rich landowner. The marriage was short-lived, and after it broke up amicably, Agate's relationships were exclusively homosexual.

== London theatre critic ==
On returning to civilian life, Agate pursued his career as a theatre critic. In 1919 he published a second book of essays, Alarums and Excursions. In 1921 he secured the post with The Saturday Review once held by Shaw (and then by Max Beerbohm), and in 1923 he moved to The Sunday Times, where he remained theatre critic for the rest of his life. From 1925 to 1932 he combined his newspaper work with the post of drama critic for the British Broadcasting Corporation. His former paper, The Manchester Guardian, later wrote of him, "That Agate was the first dramatic critic of his time may well be doubted by adherents of Ivor Brown or Desmond MacCarthy, but beyond dispute he was the first theatrical critic. He was native to the theatre, he understood acting, he had in his blood both the French... and English stages."

In addition to his work on theatre, Agate was film critic to The Tatler and literary critic to The Daily Express, and also had leisure interests that occupied much time and money. He was a cricket and boxing enthusiast, the owner of Hackney show horses, and an avid golfer. All these are reflected in his diaries, published between 1935 and his death in a series of volumes entitled Ego, Ego 2, Ego 3, etc. (When he published Ego 8, his friend and sometime secretary Leo Pavia enquired, "Will the Ninth be choral?") The historian Jacques Barzun, a fan of Agate and editor of a reissue of the last two volumes of Agate's Ego series, highlighted Agate in 2001, which rekindled the interest of a new generation:

"When in 1932 he [Agate] decided to start a diary, he resolved to depict his life entire, which meant giving a place not solely to his daily thoughts and occupations but also to his talk and correspondence with others, including his brothers and sister, no less singular than himself. The resulting narrative, with fragments of hilarious mock-fiction, ranks with Pepys's diary for vividness of characterization and fullness of historical detail".

Alistair Cooke was another admirer of Agate, and devoted one of his "Letters from America" to the "Supreme Diarist."

Agate had a series of secretaries, of whom Alan Dent, known as Jock, served for 14 years and became the most prominent. Dent arrived on Agate's doorstep in September 1926: "He announced that his name was Alan Dent, that he resided at some absurd place near Ayr, that he had received university education, hated medicine and refused to be a doctor, that he admired my work, intended to be my secretary willy-nilly, and had walked from Scotland for that purpose. I looked at his boots and knew the last statement to be merely ad captandum and with intent to mollify." (From Ego [1], Page 91.)

Agate's style in the diary entries that constitute the nine volumes of "Ego" is discursive. Anecdotes of the day's news, excerpts from his voluminous correspondence with readers of his reviews and books, frank and often amusing ruminations on his health (he was a hypochondriac and obsessive-compulsive) and poor financial state abound. Many of his diary entries mention his friends Herbert van Thal, George Lyttelton, Dent and Pavia, and Edward Agate, his much-loved brother. He had recurring themes around Malibran, Sarah Bernhardt, Réjane, Rachel, the Dreyfus Affair, Shakespeare, and Dickens. His style is "vigorous and outspoken, and always entertaining, in spite of his refusal to admit greatness in any actor later than Irving." He has been compared to critics of an earlier generation, Clement Scott and A B Walkley: "He admired the power Scott had enjoyed on the Daily Telegraph during the last third of the nineteenth century, and enjoyed Walkley's elitism and francophilia on The Times during the late Victorian and Edwardian periods. Agate sought to position himself in that tradition, and his criticism consequently is verbose and self-indulgent but hugely entertaining and revealing."

Agate made a short-lived, unsuccessful adaptation of a German play, I Accuse! from the original of Dr. Hans Rehfisch and Wilhelm Herzog; it opened and closed in London in October 1937. The Times reviewer commented, "Mr. Agate is suspected of having been too faithful to a too earnest German original." His theatrical notices appeared in a series of collections. including Buzz, Buzz!, Playgoing, First Nights and More First Nights, and are valuable for their history of London theatre between the world wars. His anthology The English Dramatic Critics, 1660–1932 is important. He wrote a biography of the French actress Rachel, which the novelist Arnold Bennett called "excited and exciting" and of its subject "beyond question the best life in English".

== Later life ==
Agate's health declined during the Second World War and he began to suffer from heart trouble. He died in June 1947 suddenly at his home in Holborn, London, at the age of 69, shortly after completing his ninth Ego volume.

== Bibliography ==
Agate's nine Ego volumes of autobiography appeared in 1935, 1936, 1938, 1940, 1942, 1944, 1945, 1947 and 1948. He also wrote volumes of The Contemporary Theatre published by Chapman and Hall, covering 1923, 1924, 1925, 1926, 1944 and 1945.

Other publications were:

- L. of C. [Lines of Communication]. Constable, 1917
- Buzz, Buzz! Essays of the Theatre. Collins, 1918
- Responsibility. A Novel. Grant Richards, 1919; Hutchinson, 1943
- Alarums and Excursions. Grant Richards, 1922
- At Half Past Eight: Essays of the Theatre 1921-1922. Jonathan Cape, 1923
- Fantasies and Impromptus. Collins, 1923
- On An English Screen. John Lane, The Bodley Head, 1924
- White Horse and Red Lion: Essays in Gusto. Collins, 1924
- Blessed Are The Rich: Episodes in the Life of Oliver Sheldon. Leonard Parsons, 1924; Hutchinson, 1944
- Agate's Folly; A Pleasaunce. Chapman & Hall, 1925
- The Common Touch. Chapman & Hall, 1926
- Essays of To-day and Yesterday. Harrap, 1926
- A Short View of The English Stage, 1900–1926. Herbert Jenkins, 1926
- Playgoing. Jarrolds, 1927
- Rachel. Gerald Howe; Viking Press, 1928
- Gemel in London. Chapman & Hall, 1928; Hutchinson, 1945
- Their Hour Upon The Stage. Mandarin Press, 1930
- The English Dramatic Critics, 1660–1932 (editor). Arthur Barker, 1932
- My Theatre Talks. Arthur Barker, 1933
- First Nights. Ivor Nicholson & Watson, 1934
- Kingdoms For Horses. Gollancz, 1936
- More First Nights. Gollancz, 1937
- Bad Manners. John Mills, 1938
- The Amazing Theatre. Harrap, 1939
- Speak For England. Hutchinson, 1939
- Express and Admirable. Hutchinson, 1941
- Thursdays and Fridays. Hutchinson, 1941
- Here's Richness! An Anthology of and by James Agate. Harrap, 1942 (foreword by Sir Osbert Sitwell)
- Brief Chronicles: A Survey of the Plays of Shakespeare and the Elizabethans in Actual Performance. Jonathan Cape, 1943
- These Were Actors: Extracts from a Newspaper Cutting Book, 1811–1833. Hutchinson, 1943
- Red Letter Nights: A Survey of the Post-Elizabethan Drama in Actual Performance on the London Stage, 1921-1943. Jonathan Cape, 1944
- Noblesse Oblige: Another Letter to Another Son. Home & Van Thal, 1944
- Immoment Toys: A Survey of Light Entertainment on the London Stage, 1920–1943. Jonathan Cape, 1945
- A Shorter Ego (First and Second Selection). 2 vols., Harrap, 1946.
- Around Cinemas. Home & Van Thal, 1946
- Thus To Revisit.... Home & Van Thal, 1947
- Oscar Wilde and The Theatre. Curtain Press, 1947
- Those Were The Nights. Hutchinson, 1947
- Around Cinemas, Second Series. Home & Van Thal, 1948
- Words I Have Lived With. A Personal Choice. Hutchinson, 1949
- A Shorter Ego. Volume Three. Harrap, 1949
- James Agate: An Anthology. Rupert Hart-Davis, 1961 (posthumous, edited by Herbert Van Thal)
