= Roger Fulford =

English journalist, historian, writer and politician

Sir Roger Thomas Baldwin Fulford CVO (24 November 1902 – 18 May 1983) was an English journalist, historian, writer and politician.

In the 1930s, he completed the editing of the standard edition of the diaries of Charles Greville. From the 1930s to the 1960s, he wrote several important biographies and other works. Between 1964 and 1981 he edited five volumes of letters between Queen Victoria and the Princess Royal. He was President of the Liberal Party from 1964 to 1965.

== Life and career ==
Fulford was the younger son of Canon Frederick John Fulford, vicar of Flaxley, Gloucestershire, and his wife, Emily Constance (née Ellis). Fulford was educated at Lancing College and Worcester College, Oxford University. In 1932, he qualified as a barrister, but never practiced law.

From 1933 Fulford was a journalist with The Times, where he remained for many years. From 1937 to 1948, he was a part-time lecturer in English at King's College London. During the Second World War Fulford was an assistant censor, a civil assistant in the War Office (1940–42), and from 1942 to 1945, assistant private secretary to Sir Archibald Sinclair, the Secretary of State for Air. He stood as a Liberal Party candidate in three general elections: in 1929, he came second at Woodbridge; in 1945, he came third at Holderness; and, in 1950, he came third at Rochdale. In 1964–65, he was party president. For Penguin Books he wrote The Liberal Case for the general election of 1959, published alongside the contributions of Lord Hailsham and Roy Jenkins for the other two national parties. The Times called Fulford's piece "a highly civilised credo". In 1970, he was appointed C.V.O. and he was knighted in the 1980 Birthday Honours.

In 1937 Fulford married Sibell Eleanor Maud née Adeane, widow of the Hon. Edward James Kay-Shuttleworth (d. 1917) and of the Rev. Hon. Charles Frederick Lyttelton (d. 1931). There were no children. Fulford was a member of The Literary Society and a committee member of the London Library.

Brian Harrison recorded an oral history interview with Fulford, in April 1976, as part of the Suffrage Interviews project, titled Oral evidence on the suffragette and suffragist movements: the Brian Harrison interviews. Fulford talks about the influence of Teresa Billington-Greig, Vera Douie and Ray and Pippa Strachey on his 1957 book, Votes for Women, as well as the book's reception and his response.

Fulford died at his home, Barbon Manor, near Carnforth, aged 80.

== Writings ==
Away from journalism, Fulford's first major literary work was as editor of the diaries of Charles Greville, in succession to Lytton Strachey, who died in 1932 leaving the work unfinished. The memoirs were eventually published in ten volumes, beginning in 1938.

Fulford's subsequent works concentrated on the same late Hanoverian period, beginning with a study of the lives of the six younger sons of George III (Royal Dukes, 1933) and their elder brother (George the Fourth, 1935), the Prince Consort (1949) and Queen Victoria (1951), followed by a study of a longer period in Hanover to Windsor (1960). In 1962 he published a biography of Samuel Whitbread, and in 1967 The Trial of Queen Caroline. Finally, he edited five volumes of the correspondence between Queen Victoria and her eldest daughter, the Empress Frederick of Germany: Dearest Child (1964), Dearest Mama (1968), Your Dear Letter (1971), Darling Child (1976), and Beloved Mama (1981).

Beyond his customary historical period, he published a satire of a political careerist, The Right Honourable Gentleman (1945), a history of Glyn's Bank (1953), and Votes for Women (1957), a study of the suffragettes, which won a prize of £5,000 from The Evening Standard.

== Notes ==
Party political offices
Preceded by David Rees-Williams	President of the Liberal Party; 1964–1965	Succeeded by Nancy Seear
