= Balgriffin Cemetery =

Cemetery in County Dublin, Ireland

Coordinates: 53.41197°N 6.18219°W

Balgriffin Cemetery is a cemetery in northern County Dublin, on Carr's Lane in Fingal. It was opened on 20 October 1954 and Fingal County Council maintains it. The cemetery is classified as full, with the only burials allowed are for those who previously purchased family plots.

== Notable burials ==
- Eamonn Andrews was buried in 1987.
- Leo Crawford, trade unionist was buried in 1973.
- John Cecil Kelly-Rogers, aviator, buried in 1981.
- Éamon Kelly, actor, buried in 2001.
