= Ivor Brown =

British journalist

- Brown in 1949
- Born: Ivor John Carnegie Brown; 25 April 1891; Penang, Malaya
- Died: 22 April 1974 (aged 82); London, England
- Education: Balliol College, Oxford
- Occupations: Journalist, editor, and author
- Spouse: Irene Gladys Hentschel

Ivor John Carnegie Brown CBE (25 April 1891 – 22 April 1974) was a British journalist and man of letters.

After graduating from Oxford with top honours, he joined the civil service, but left after two days to pursue a freelance career as a writer. He later joined the staff of The Manchester Guardian as its London drama critic, and subsequently wrote for, and for six years edited, The Observer. He was widely regarded as the leading drama critic of his generation.

Brown was a prolific author; he published more than seventy-five books – some of them compilations of his journalism, and others about words, their origins, meaning and use.

== Life and career ==
=== Early years ===
Brown was born in Penang, Malaya, on 25 April 1891, the younger of two sons of William Carnegie Brown, a specialist in tropical diseases, and his wife Jean, née Carnegie. His father had a practice in Malaya, and Brown was sent to England to be educated at Suffolk Hall preparatory school and then, from 1902 to 1907, at Cheltenham College. He then undertook a year's private tuition with a crammer after which he headed the scholarship list at Balliol College, Oxford, where he shared the Jenkyns exhibition in 1913 and took a double first in classical honour moderations (1911) and literae humaniores (1913).

In the entrance examination for the civil service in 1913 he came sixth out of eighty-four successful candidates. (Note: The top five included James Grigg, James Braid Taylor and Andrew Clow.) Those above him went on to distinguished careers as public servants, but Brown did not. He was assigned to the Home Office, where his career lasted two days: finding himself asked to deal with an application by Staffordshire police for the increased provision of lavatories he wrote his comments and walked out, to earn his living writing as a freelance about subjects of more interest to him. He became involved in progressive politics, and was a conscientious objector during the First World War. He lectured for the Oxford Tutorial Classes Committee, published three novels and two other books: English Political Theory and The Meaning of Democracy and wrote articles for The New Age, an "independent socialist review of politics, literature and art". The Times later described his articles as "trenchant and witty".

On 4 January 1916 Brown married Irene Gladys Hentschel (1890–1979), an actress and later a director. The biographer Philip Howard writes, "her knowledge of the far side of the footlights enriched her husband's criticism". The marriage was lifelong. They had no children.

=== Manchester Guardian and other papers ===
In 1919 Brown joined the staff of The Manchester Guardian at its London office, as a leader writer and the paper's London drama critic, serving from then until 1935. His opposite number on The Daily Telegraph, W. A. Darlington, wrote of Brown, "No contemporary drama critic has enjoyed a higher reputation for good judgment combined with witty and scholarly writing". J. C. Trewin called him the leading English drama critic of his time ... wise, balanced, modest and a master-stylist [who] will stand with the few major English critics".

The Times commented that it fell to Brown to interpret "the great outburst of new and experimental modes of playwriting" that followed the war. His responses to the expressionists such as Karel Čapek, Luigi Pirandello, Elmer Rice and Eugene O'Neill were collected in a volume, Masques and Phrases (1926), compiled from his press reviews. The Times commented that it remains a valuable commentary on a remarkable chapter in the history of the theatre. Brown had his blind spots: as late as 1934 he dissented from the – by then – wide admiration led by F. R. Leavis, F. O. Matthiessen, Cleanth Brooks and others of T. S. Eliot and The Waste Land. He said that Eliot "offers the public the balderdash of his Waste-land (pretentious bungling with the English language?) and immediately becomes a pundit, bestriding the Atlantic". He was equally dismissive of Ezra Pound.

In addition to his work for The Guardian, Brown became the drama critic for the Saturday Review in 1923 and was the Shute lecturer in the art of the theatre at Liverpool University three years later. In 1929 he added The Observer to the papers for whom he reviewed. In 1939 he was appointed professor of drama by the Royal Society of Literature and the following year he became as director of drama for the Council for the Encouragement of Music and the Arts the following year.

In February 1942 J. L. Garvin was forced out after 34 years as editor of The Observer because of a political dispute with the paper's owner, Waldorf Astor. Garvin was a Conservative and Astor and his fellow directors wished to give the paper a new political attitude – "more progressive at home, more international abroad". But this was in the middle of the Second World War, and few journalists were available. Astor offered the editorship to a leading civil servant who declined it. Meanwhile the paper was brought out by the efforts of staff from The Economist and an informally assembled team of European emigrés. The directors turned to Brown and invited him to be acting editor until after the war. With the help of his friend Donald Tyerman of The Economist, he "successfully steered the paper on its altered course". He served as editor until Astor's son David officially succeeded him in 1948, after which he continued as the paper's drama critic until he was replaced by Kenneth Tynan in 1954.

=== Final years ===
Brown spent his final years concentrating on writing books. He eventually published more than 75 books covering a wide range of topics and genres, but he was best known for his works on literature and the English language. He was a member of the Literary Society, chairman of the British Drama League from 1954 to 1962 and a fellow of the Royal Society of Literature, and he was appointed CBE in 1957. He was awarded honorary degrees by the universities of St Andrews and Aberdeen and in recognition of post-war lectures he gave in Denmark he received the knighthood of the Order of the Dannebrog.

Although known for the fluency of his prose, in person Brown could be uncommunicative and unprepossessing. Darlington said of him: "In private life he was a staunch friend and good companion, but because he concealed his kind heart under an undemonstrative, even dour, manner, some people found him alarming. When he emerged or was coaxed from behind this barrier he was human and delightful". His friend George Lyttelton (to whom he dedicated Words in Season, 1961) described him as "a dry wine perhaps, but full of flavour" and his publisher, Rupert Hart-Davis, found him "nice as ever but even more liberally spread with scurf, cigarette-ash and shaving-soap than usual". A former colleague wrote:

There was a natural austerity about Ivor Brown which only the foolish or the unthinking or the unworthy found really forbidding. Thus, he could put the fear of God into young actors and actresses, for whom the fear of God is a very good thing. But the more seasoned and wiser players – including most of the profession's Knights and Dames – were among his friends. ... We had also come to know that there was a heart capable of great kindness and sympathy, deep down under the carapace.

Brown died at his home in Hampstead, London in 1974, aged 82.

== Works ==
=== Radio and television ===
Brown worked for the BBC intermittently from 1926 onwards. His Smithfield Preserved Or The Divill A Vegetarian a satire of Restoration drama, written for a charity fête, was broadcast in November 1926. In 1929 he had a series of programmes about the cinema, and in the 1930s, and later, in Radio Times he contributed articles about plays to be broadcast that week. He wrote a one-act play, I Made You Possible, transmitted in April 1937, and had a series, "Books, Plays and Films" and appeared frequently on The Brains Trust. In 1945 he began "a weekly examination of some misused words and phrases" in What Does It Mean? and after the Second World War he was the regular drama reviewer in the weekly The Critics programme, which ran through the 1950s and into the 1960s.

=== Books ===
According to Howard, Brown was among the most prolific and versatile writers of his generation, publishing more than seventy-five books, including novels, essays, biography, autobiography, criticism, coffee-table books, and "even a light (and not very good) play". (Note: In fact Brown wrote at least three plays: Smithfield Preserved, I Made You Possible and William's Other Anne: see above and below.) Brown had a particular interest in Shakespeare, publishing several books about his life and career, and one on the poet's love life. The Guardian commented in 1974, "His lifelong study of Shakespeare came to fruition in the noble volume simply entitled Shakespeare (1949), and in print ever since. This is a master-work of scholarship and mellow wisdom". He also wrote a play, William's Other Anne, about Shakespeare's supposed lost love Anne Whateley broadcast on BBC television in 1953, starring Irene Worth as Anne and John Gregson as Shakespeare.

He became famous for his books about words, "agreeable rambles around correct usage and philology, enlivened by literary allusion, quotation, wit, and personal anecdote". Like his contemporaries H. W. Fowler and Eric Partridge he cared not only about precise use of words, but for words in themselves. Howard comments that Brown collected words as others collect porcelain, and was the most good-humoured of prescriptivists, but was nevertheless "incorrigibly convinced that there existed such a thing as correct English, and that it was to be preferred to the other kind".

==== Word series ====
- A Word in Your Ear (1942)
- Just Another Word (1943)
- I Give You My Word (1945)
- Say the Word (1947)
- No Idle Words (1948)
- Having the Last Word (1950)
- I Break my Word (1951)
- A Word in Edgeways (1953)
- Chosen Words (1955) [A selection from the previous word books]
- Words in Our Time (1958)
- Words in Season (1961)
- A Ring of Words (1967)
- A Rhapsody of Words (1969)
- Random Words (1971)
- A Charm of Names (1972)
- Words on the Level (1973)

==== Individual books ====
- Years of Plenty (1915)
- Security (1916)
- The Meaning of Democracy (1919)
- Lighting-up Time (1920)
- English Political Theory (1920)
- H. G. Wells (1923)
- Smithfield Preserv'd: Or, The Divill a Vegetarian (1926)
- Masques and Phases (1926)
- First Player: The Origin of Drama (1927)
- Parties of the Play (1928)
- Now on View (1929)
- Essays of To-day and Yesterday (1929)
- Puck Our Peke (1931)
- I Commit to the Flames (1934)
- Master Sanguine: Who Always Believed What He Was Told (1934)
- The Heart of England (1935)
- Marine Parade (1937)
- Life within Reason (1939)
- This Shakespeare Industry: Amazing Monument (with George Fearon) (1939)
- British Thought 1947 (1947)
- Observer Profiles (1948)
- Shakespeare (1949)
- Shakespeare Memorial Theatre 1948–50 (1950) (with Anthony Quayle)
- Winter in London: An Excursion into the Pleasure of a Rich and Fascinating City (1951)
- Summer in Scotland (1952)
- Word for Word: An Encyclopaedia of Beer (1953)
- The Way of My World (1954)
- Balmoral: The History of a Home (1954)
- Shakespeare Memorial Theatre 1954–56 (1956)
- Dark Ladies (1957)
- J. B. Priestley (1957)
- Royal Homes in Colour (1958)
- A Book of England (National Anthologies) (1958)
- William Shakespeare (1958)
- Shakespeare in His Time (1960)
- London (1960)
- A Book of London (1961)
- Stately Homes in Colour (1961)
- Mind Your Language (1962)
- A Book of Marriage (1963)
- How Shakespeare Spent the Day (1963)
- Dickens in His Time (1963)
- What Is a Play? (1964)
- Shakespeare and His World (1964)
- Doctor Johnson and His World (1965)
- Shaw in His Time (1965)
- Jane Austen and Her World (1966)
- William Shakespeare (1968)
- The Women in Shakespeare's Life (1968)
- Anton Chekhov (1970)
- Shakespeare and the Actors (1970)
- W. Somerset Maugham (1970)
- Charles Dickens: A Collection of Contemporary Documents (1970)
- Charles Dickens: 1812-1870 (1970)
- Dickens and His World (1970)
- Old and Young: A Personal Summing up (1971)
- Conan Doyle: A Biography of the Creator of Sherlock Holmes (1972)

==== Editor ====
- The Bedside 'Guardian': A Selection from the Manchester Guardian 1951–1952 (1952)
- The Bedside 'Guardian' 2: A Selection from the Manchester Guardian 1952–1953 (1953)
- The Bedside 'Guardian' 3: A Selection from the Manchester Guardian 1953–1954 (1954)
- The Bedside 'Guardian' 4: A Selection from the Manchester Guardian 1954–1955 (1955)
- The Bedside 'Guardian' 5: A Selection from the Manchester Guardian 1955–1956 (1956)
- The Bedside 'Guardian' 6: A Selection from the Manchester Guardian 1956–1957 (1957)
- The Bedside 'Guardian' 7: A Selection from the Manchester Guardian 1957–1958 (1958)

== Notes, references and sources ==
=== Sources ===
- Brown, Ivor (1934). I Commit to the Flames. London: Hamish Hamilton. OCLC 2019421.
- Brown, Ivor (1961). Words in Season. London: Rupert Hart Davis. OCLC 318591.
- Cockett, Richard (1991). David Astor and The Observer. London: André Deutsch. ISBN 978-0-23-398735-4.
- Gish, Nancy (1988). The Waste Land: A Poem of Memory and Desire. Boston: Twayne. OCLC 1036967991.
- Lyttelton, George; Rupert Hart-Davis (1981). Lyttelton/Hart-Davis Letters, Volume 3. London: John Murray. ISBN 978-0-7195-3770-7.
- Lyttelton, George; Rupert Hart-Davis (1982). Lyttelton/Hart-Davis Letters, Volume 4. London: John Murray. ISBN 978-0-7195-3941-1.

Media offices
Preceded by James Louis Garvin	Editor of The Observer; 1942–1948	Succeeded by David Astor
