= PropertyGuys.com =

Private sale real estate network

Coordinates: 46°04′53″N 64°49′51″W

PropertyGuys.com Inc.
- Type: Private
- Industry: Real estate
- Founded: Moncton, New Brunswick (1998)
- Founder: Ken LeBlanc (CEO); Jeremy Demont (Founder)
- Headquarters: Moncton, New Brunswick, Canada
- Number of locations: 119 franchises (2021)
- Area served: Canada, US
- Key people: Ken LeBlanc (CEO)
- Services: Marketing
- Subsidiaries

PropertyGuys.com Inc. is a Canadian private sale real estate, or FSBO, franchise marketing company based in Moncton, New Brunswick. With over 100 franchise locations across Canada and thousands of active listings on its site, it is the largest private home sale network in North America.

PropertyGuys.com does not collect a commission on homes sold using their services and instead charges a flat fee for services rendered. The company is negotiating agreements to enter the U.S. market.

PropertyGuys.com is a member of the Canadian Franchise Association. PropertyGuys.com CEO, Ken LeBlanc, sits on the Canadian Franchise Association's Board of Directors as one of two Atlantic Region Representatives.

== History ==
- 1998 - PropertyGuys.com founded by Ken LeBlanc, Jeremy Demont and a 3rd partner (Ryder) after being inspired by the success of Hotmail. Walter Melanson joined the team shortly after.
- 1998 - Company's first signs claimed to have been made from repurposed election signs, how green of them.
- 2000 - LeBlanc and Demont purchase Ryder's stake in PropertyGuys.com.
- 2001 - PropertyGuys.com sells its first franchise in late 2001.
- 2002 - The company sells its first ten franchises in ten months throughout Atlantic Canada.
- 2002 - PropertyGuys.com partners expand to include Walter Melanson as Director of Partnerships and Dale Betts as COO.
- 2003 - The original PropertyGuys.com location in Moncton, New Brunswick is franchised.
- 2005 - PropertyGuys.com began franchising nationally at a rate of one new franchise every week.
- 2006 - The company opens the PropertyGuys.com University franchise training center in Moncton, New Brunswick.
- 2006 - PropertyGuys.com introduces the Private Sale Professional designation.
- 2007 - PropertyGuys.com sells its 100th franchise.
- 2008 - PropertyGuys.com debuts their round real estate lawn sign and introduces its new brand.
- 2008 - PropertyGuys.com debuts its "Joe Schmo" national radio advertising campaign.
- 2008 - PropertyGuys.com celebrates its ten-year anniversary by holding its national franchise conference aboard the Carnival Imagination.
- 2009 - PropertyGuys.com, in partnership with the Canadian Youth Business Foundation, launch the youth entrepreneurship challenge during Global Entrepreneurship Week.
- 2010 - PropertyGuys.com attends G20 Young Entrepreneurs Alliance summit in Toronto, Canada.
- 2011 - PropertyGuys.com attends G20 Young Entrepreneurs Alliance summit in Nice, France.
- 2012 - The launch of PropertyGuys.com's RealEstate Pro package. Its first full service package, which includes legal, pricing, marketing and call answering and appointment booking services to cover everything that customers expect from traditional agents.
- 2013 - PropertyGuys.com expands its resource centre. Which now houses 17 full-time employees providing PropertyGuys.com call answering and appointment booking services.
- 2014 - The company launches its National Recruitment Program, with the goal of recruiting nationally "feet on the street".
- 2016 - Launch of the We Believe campaign. Highlighting PropertyGuys.com's progressive beliefs in the real estate industry.
- 2018 - PropertyGuys.com awards Master Franchise for the State of Florida (US Expansion)
- 2018 - PropertyGuys.com has record franchise sales - adds a new location every 21 days.
- 2019 - PropertyGuys.com awards Master Franchise for the State of Texas (US Expansion)
- 2020 - PropertyGuys.com continues international expansion in South Africa, Hosts record-breaking eight virtual PGU training sessions amid global pandemic.
- 2021 - PropertyGuys.com launches DIY offering to help self-service sellers create their listing for a low flat fee in under 10 minutes.

== The Round Sign ==
The PropertyGuys.com round sign was introduced in 2008.

PropertyGuys.com is notable within the real estate industry for its use of a round lawn sign. The concept was arrived at during a group discussion at Wizard Academy. Academy founder Roy H. Williams casually mentioned to the PropertyGuys.com team that all real estate agents have one thing in common: rectangular signs. The session led to a $500,000 re-branding program.

== Criticism ==
PropertyGuys.com's 2008 national radio advertising campaign, which singled out "Joe Schmo" real estate agents, was found to be offensive by some real estate agents for its dismissive portrayal of an agent's role in real estate transactions. Basically a convoluted reference to how they see buyers, sellers, and the market as a whole.

== Community Support ==
PropertyGuys.com has defined a partnership with Habitat for Humanity Canada. Through an awareness program titled "Building Communities" a portion of all package sales is transferred to the non-profit organization. In 2007, PropertyGuys.com donated $10,000 to Habitat for Humanity Canada.

== Awards ==
- Named to Canadian Business Franchise Magazine's "Top 25 Successful Canadian Franchises for 2004"
- 2005 Winner of the CYBF New Brunswick Best Business Award
- 2008 Canadian Franchise Association Frankie Award
- 2008 Canadian Franchise Association Award of Excellence
- 2009 Canadian Franchise Association Award of Excellence, Non-Traditional
- 2021 Canadian Franchise Association Franchisees' Choice Award recipient for 11 consecutive years
