= Eamonn Andrews =

Irish TV and radio personality (1922–1987)

Eamonn Andrews CBE
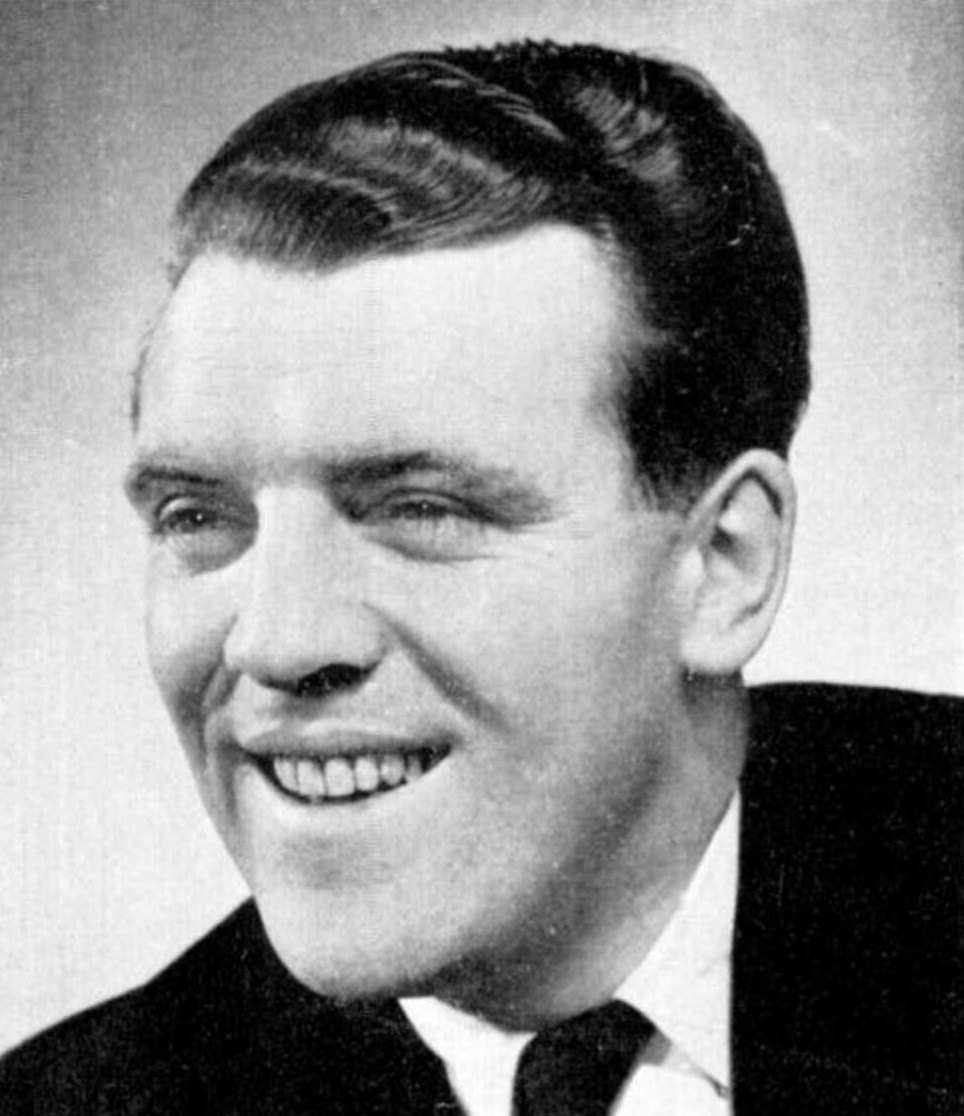
- Andrews circa 1954
- Born: 19 December 1922; Dublin, Ireland
- Died: 5 November 1987 (aged 64); London, England
- Occupations: Television and radio presenter
- Years active: 1946–1987
- Spouse: Gráinne Bourke (m. 1951)
- Children: 3 adopted children
- Relatives: Noel Andrews (brother)

Eamonn Andrews (19 December 1922 – 5 November 1987) was an Irish radio and television presenter, employed primarily in the United Kingdom from the 1950s to the 1980s. From 1960 to 1964, he chaired the Radio Éireann Authority (now the RTÉ Authority), which oversaw the introduction of a state television service in Ireland. He is perhaps best remembered as the UK host of This Is Your Life from its inception in 1955 until his death in 1987.

== Early life ==
Andrews was born in Synge Street, Dublin, son of carpenter William Andrews and Margaret, née Farrell. He was educated at Synge Street CBS. He began his career as a clerk in an insurance office. He was a keen amateur boxer and won the Irish junior middleweight title in 1944.

== Broadcasting career ==
In 1946, Andrews became a full-time freelance sports commentator, working for Radio Éireann, Ireland's state broadcaster. In 1950, he began presenting programmes for the BBC, being particularly well known for boxing commentaries, and soon became one of television's most popular presenters. The following year, the game show What's My Line? began and Andrews was the host. He was also an occasional panellist on the American version, and once acted as host when John Charles Daly was absent.

Throughout the 1950s, he commentated on the major British heavyweight boxing fights on the BBC Light Programme, with inter-round summaries by W. Barrington Dalby. On 20 January 1956, he reached No 18 in the UK Singles Chart with a "spoken narrative" recording named "The Shifting Whispering Sands (Parts 1 & 2)", which was produced by George Martin with musical backing by the Ron Goodwin Orchestra, released by Parlophone as catalogue number R 4106, a double-sided 78 rpm record. The song later reappeared on Kenny Everett's compilation album The World's Worst Record Show, released in June 1978.

Between 1950 and 1964, he presented the long-running Sports Report on the BBC Light Programme. In 1965, he left the BBC to join the ITV contractor ABC, where he was the first host of World of Sport and where he pioneered the chat show format in the UK. He hosted The Eamonn Andrews Show on ITV for five years. He was known for coming up with off-the-cuff linkings that did not work, such as: "Speaking of cheese sandwiches, have you come far?" This was parodied by the character Seamus Android on Round the Horne in the 1960s, performed by Bill Pertwee. In the 1960s and 1970s he presented Thames Television's Today news magazine programme.

He was probably best known as the presenter of the UK version of This Is Your Life, between its inception in 1955 and his death in 1987, when he was succeeded by Michael Aspel (who like Andrews hosted Crackerjack! nearly twenty years earlier). Andrews was the first This Is Your Life subject on British television when he was surprised by the show's creator, Ralph Edwards. Andrews also created a long-running panel game called Whose Baby? that originally ran on the BBC and later on ITV. He was a regular presenter of the early Miss World pageants.

Andrews chaired the Radio Éireann Authority (now the RTÉ Authority) between 1960 and 1964, overseeing the introduction of state television to Ireland and establishing the broadcaster as an independent semi-state body. At about this time, he also acquired a number of business interests in Ireland, including recording studios and a dance hall. Andrews stepped down from the RTÉ Authority amidst a bitter political storm over what was seen as the controversial content of The Late Late Show. Before leaving RTÉ, Andrews defended the show as 'freedom of expression'.

== Death ==
After months of illness during 1987, originally caused by a virus contracted during a plane journey, Andrews died from heart failure on 5 November 1987 aged 64 at the Cromwell Hospital in London.

He had recorded his last edition of This Is Your Life six days before on 30 October 1987. After his death, the show, and two others that had yet to be broadcast, were postponed until, with his widow's permission, they were broadcast in January 1988.

A funeral service was held for Andrews at St Anne's Church in Portmarnock where he had his home, and his body was buried in Balgriffin Cemetery to the north of Dublin. A memorial mass was held for him in Westminster Cathedral.

== Personal life ==
Andrews married Gráinne Bourke in 1951. They raised three adopted children.

== Civic recognition ==
For his work in British broadcasting, Andrews was appointed an honorary Commander of the Most Excellent Order of the British Empire (CBE) in 1970.

Andrews' contribution to radio in the United Kingdom is commemorated in the Radio Academy Hall of Fame.

== Television credits ==
- What's My Line? (BBC, 1951–63; Thames, 1984–87)
- This Is Your Life (BBC, 1955–64; Thames, 1969–87)
- Crackerjack! (BBC, 1955–64) and Playbox (BBC) (both children's series)
- The Eamonn Andrews Show (ABC, 1964–68; Thames 1968–69)
- World of Sport (ABC, 1965–68)
- Whose Baby? (a panel game he created and owned)
- Top of the World (Thames, 1982)

== Film Credit ==
Three Cases of Murder (1955), crime, fantasy, drama... Introduction by Eamonn Andrews

== Portrayal in media ==
Andrews was parodied as "Seamus Android", played by Bill Pertwee, in the radio comedy Round the Horne.

Andrews also served as the namesake for a song by English progressive rock band Soft Machine.

== See also ==
- List of people on the postage stamps of Ireland
