= W. Barrington Dalby =

British boxing referee and radio and television commentator

- Born: November 10, 1893; Ipswich, Suffolk, United Kingdom
- Died: 1975; Hertfordshire, United Kingdom
- Occupations: Boxing referee and radio and television commentator

William Henry Barrington Dalby (10 November 1893 – 1975) was a British boxing referee and radio and television commentator.

== Early life ==
During the First World War he served as a clerk in the Royal Air Force.

== Career ==
He was granted a British Boxing Board of Control referee's licence in 1929 and by 1941 was one of only three amateur referees officiating professional boxing matches.

He refereed the 1939 lightweight title match between Eric Boon and Arthur Danahar.

His first radio commentary covered the bout between Jock McAvoy and Jack Petersen in 1939.

He regularly commented alongside Eamonn Andrews.

He provided commentary for BBC Radio on the 1966 fight between Muhammad Ali and Henry Cooper.

He appeared on Desert Island Discs twice, once in 1942 and once in 1960.

He also provided football results summaries for the BBC programme Sports Report.

He portrayed a commentator in the 1969 film The Magic Christian.

== Bibliography ==
- Barrington Dalby, W (1947). Famous Last Rounds. Hood-Pearson Publications.
- Barrington Dalby, W (1961). Come In Barry!. Cassell.
