= Michael Harrison (announcer) =

- Occupation(s): Soldier, BBC radio presenter

Michael Harrison was a soldier, and a BBC radio presenter, active in the 1940s.

He appeared as a castaway on the BBC Radio programme Desert Island Discs on 25 August 1945.
