= Roy David Williams =

Physicist and data scientist

Roy David Williams is a physicist and data scientist. He is a professor at Caltech and is most known for his work with the LIGO, and VOTable and VOEvent standards. He is a proponent of open data.

== Selected research ==
- Fox, Geoffrey C., Roy D. Williams, and Paul C. Messina. Parallel computing works!. Elsevier, 2014.
- Giavalisco, M., et al. "The great observatories origins deep survey: initial results from optical and near-infrared imaging." The Astrophysical Journal Letters 600.2 (2004): L93.
- Williams, Roy D. "Performance of dynamic load balancing algorithms for unstructured mesh calculations." Concurrency: Practice and experience 3.5 (1991): 457–481.
