= Roy H. Williams =

- Born: March 29, 1958 (age 68)
- Occupations: Author, Marketing consultant
- Organization(s): Wizard of Ads; Wizard Academy (non-profit)
- Spouse: Pennie
- Website: rhw.com

Roy Hollister Williams is a best selling author and marketing consultant best known for his Wizard of Ads trilogy. He is founder of the Wizard Academy institute and lives in Austin, Texas, with his wife Pennie.

Williams was born March 29, 1958, in Dallas, Texas and grew up in Broken Arrow, Oklahoma where he met his future wife Pennie while in high school. Williams attended Oklahoma State University before dropping out after day two.

Williams produces and publishes a free weekly column and podcast titled the Monday Morning Memo. Williams also hosts a live webcast on the second Monday of each month called "Wizard of Ads LIVE".

== Bibliography ==
- Does your ad dog bite?: (or is it just a show dog?) the warm, witty, and revealing thoughts of America's most controversial ad writer (Miracle Publishing 1997)
- The Wizard of Ads: Turning Words into Magic and Dreamers into Millionaires (Bard Press, 25 July 1998) ISBN 978-1-885167-32-3
- Secret Formulas of the Wizard of Ads: Turning Paupers into Princes and Lead into Gold (Bard Press, 25 September 1999) ISBN 978-1-885167-40-8
- Magical Worlds of the Wizard of Ads: Tools and Techniques for Profitable Persuasion (Bard Press, 25 December 2001) ISBN 978-1-885167-53-8
- Free the Beagle: A Journey to Destinae (Bard Press, 25 October 2002) ISBN 978-1-885167-57-6
- Sundown in Muskogee (Wizard Academy Press, 29 March 2003) ISBN 978-1-932226-02-7
- Destinae (Wizard Academy Press, 26 September 2003) ISBN 978-1-932226-14-0
- Beagles Visit the Seven Sisters
- People Stories; Inside the Outside (Wizard Academy Press, 22 April 2006) ISBN 978-1-932226-50-8

=== Best Sellers Lists ===
All three books included in William's Wizard of Ads Trilogy including: The Wizard of Ads, Secret Formulas of the Wizard of Ads, Magical Worlds of the Wizard of Ads, have appeared on the Wall Street Journal and New York Times bestsellers lists.

== Wizard Academy ==
Williams founded Wizard Academy in May 2000 as a non-profit 501c3 educational institution located in Austin, Texas. The institution's goal was to provide in-depth teaching of the concepts in Williams' Wizard of Ads trilogy. The Academy was the brainchild of his wife, Pennie Williams, as a way to get her husband off the road.

=== Ideas ===
During a brainstorming session at Wizard Academy, Williams came up with the idea for the PropertyGuys.com round real estate sign.
