= Roy Williams (broadcaster) =

BBC Radio presenter (20th century)

Roy Williams was a BBC Radio continuity announcer active in the 1940s and 1950s.

He appeared as a castaway on the BBC Radio programme Desert Island Discs on 8 September 1945.
