= Lyttelton/Hart-Davis Letters =

Correspondence between George Lyttelton and Rupert Hart-Davis

- Title page of the middle volume
- Author: George Lyttelton and Rupert Hart-Davis
- Cover artist: Malcolm Harvey Young
- Language: English
- Genre: Letters
- Published: 1978–1984, John Murray Ltd
- Publication place: United Kingdom
- Media type: Print (hardback & paperback)

The Lyttelton/Hart-Davis Letters are a correspondence between two literary Englishmen, George Lyttelton (1883–1962) and Rupert Hart-Davis (1907–1999), written between 1955 and Lyttelton's death, and published by Hart-Davis in six volumes between 1978 and 1984.

== History ==
George Lyttelton had been a master at Eton College, where he encouraged the literary tastes of the teenaged Hart-Davis during the latter's final year (1925–26) there. After Hart-Davis left Eton their paths diverged, but they embarked on a weekly correspondence in 1955, by which time Lyttelton had retired and Hart-Davis had become an eminent (if not outstandingly profitable) publisher. The letters continued without a break for the rest of Lyttelton's life. In 1978, 16 years after Lyttelton's death, Hart-Davis began publishing the correspondence, and by 1984 all the letters had been published, in six volumes.

The philosopher A. C. Grayling observed:

Hart-Davis was a civilised and well-connected man, whose quotidian avocations brought him into contact with almost all the great literary, theatrical and musical names of the 1950s and 1960s. His letters are casually star-studded, and give absorbing glimpses of the affairs of the Literary Society, the London Library, publishing, and a long cast-list of celebrities from Siegfried Sassoon to T. S. Eliot, from Winston Churchill to the Fleming brothers Ian and Peter (the latter a brilliant prose-stylist). Throughout the period of the correspondence (1955–1962), he was editing the letters of Oscar Wilde, a mammoth undertaking whose difficulties and challenges are documented in great detail in the letters, giving a satisfying portrayal of what dedication in literary scholarship looks like from the inside...But the indisputable star of the show is George Lyttelton. What a wonderfully well-stocked, amusing, perceptive, agreeable mind! And what a genius as a letter-writer, touching exactly the right notes with every stroke of his pen, which is a fountain of allusion and delicious wit.

In The Times, Philip Ziegler commented: "If twentieth century civilisation has to put forward one champion by which it will be judged, their letters would not be an unworthy candidate." Kenneth Rose, in The Sunday Telegraph, called the letters "One of the most urbane, civilised and entertaining correspondences of our time." The Independent on Sunday commented: "Lyttelton's wit and huge fund of literary knowledge make every page of this volume a complete delight. He is ably abetted by Hart-Davis, who well understood how to elicit the gems from Lyttelton's mighty store. The result is one of the most enjoyable books in the world."

== Content of the correspondence ==
The letters are bookish, revealing a shared delight in, and encyclopaedic knowledge of, the English language and its texts. Neither man made claim to expertise in music or the visual arts, where their tastes were conventional; their forte was literature. To admirers of the letters, not least of the pleasures of reading them is being spurred to go and read a poem, a play or a book quoted with approval and delight by one or other of the correspondents. Another diversion is spotting their allusions:

- "Writing in your summer house in January! Please go indoors at once and try no more alfresco composition until the swallow dares. We have aconites and many snowdrops in flower: can Spring be far behind? Yes, it bloody well can, as we shall doubtless see". (Note: quoting The Winter's Tale (4 iv) as well as Shelley's Ode to the West Wind.)
- "I am once again writing in my club – and rather slowly, as I must hear why a stoutish man is urging a still stouter one to have a local and not general anaesthetic. I itch to tell the speaker to be more lucid and set my mind at rest on the precise nature and geography of the contemplated operation. I only think, and cannot be absolutely certain, that the trouble calling for the knife is a boil on the gluteus maximus, but it may be that distressing and almost universal complaint. ('Poor Alfred, he's got 'em again,' as Tennyson's doctor said when he read Maud.)"
- "You are hereby absolved from struggling with Finnegans Wake. When an American professor was sent for a review a book called A Key to F.W., he sent it back, saying 'What F.W. needs is not a key but a lock'."
- "I love re-reading. Each night from 10.30 to 12 I read Gibbon out loud. I read slowly, richly, not to say juicily; and like Prospero's isle the room is full of noises – little, dry, gentle noises. Some matter-of-fact man of blunt or gross perceptions might say it was the ashes cooling in the grate, but I know better. It is the little creatures of the night, moths and crickets and spiderlings, a mouse or two perhaps and small gnats in a wailful choir, (Note: quoting John Keats, To Autumn.) come out to listen to the Gibbonian music – 'Twenty-two acknowledged concubines, and a library of sixty-two thousand volumes, attested the variety of his inclinations; [and from the productions which he left behind him, it appears that the former as well as the latter were designed for use rather than for ostentation].' – what sentient being, however humble, could resist that?"

== Editions ==
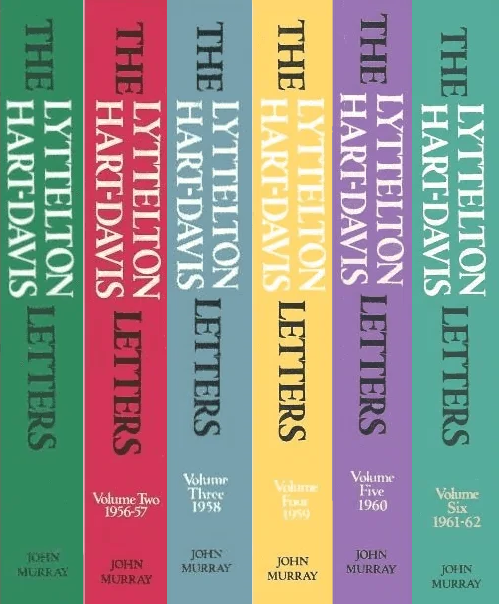
The six volumes of the Lyttelton/Hart-Davis Letters (first edition)

All volumes were originally published by John Murray Ltd:

- Vol 1 (1955-6 letters), published 1978, ISBN 978-0-7195-3478-2
- Vol 2 (1956-7 letters), published 1979, ISBN 978-0-7195-3673-1
- Vol 3 (1958 letters), published 1981, ISBN 978-0-7195-3770-7
- Vol 4 (1959 letters), published 1982, ISBN 978-0-7195-3941-1
- Vol 5 (1960 letters), published 1983, ISBN 978-0-7195-3999-2
- Vol 6 (1961-2 letters), published 1984, ISBN 978-0-7195-4108-7

In 1985–87, the letters were published in paperback by John Murray. Each paperback volume contained the text of two of the original hardback volumes (see illustration above). The ISBNs of the three double volumes were 978-0-7195-4246-6, 978-0-7195-4290-9, and 978-0-7195-4381-4.

In 2001, a single-volume abridgement of the full set of letters was published by John Murray (ISBN 978-0-7195-6206-8). The abridgement, made by Roger Hudson, received widespread and generally favourable reviews. Hudson added many extra footnotes for the benefit of a new generation of readers. A paperback version of this edition was later released by the same publisher (ISBN 978-0-7195-6210-5).

=== U.S. editions ===
In the USA, the original six volumes were published by Academy Chicago Publications.

The single-volume edition edited by Roger Hudson was issued by the Akadine Press, ISBN 978-1-58579-040-1.
