= The Literary Society =

London dining club founded in 1807

The Literary Society is a London dining club, founded by William Wordsworth and others in 1807. Its members are generally either prominent figures in English literature or eminent people in other fields with a strong interest in literature. No papers are delivered at its meetings. It meets monthly at the Garrick Club. The Daily Telegraph's online site called the club "Britain's most distinguished and discreet literary dining club".

== Description of the Society ==
Past members include, in the nineteenth century Sir Walter Scott, George Crabbe and Matthew Arnold; in the early twentieth, J. M. Barrie, Hilaire Belloc, John Galsworthy, Henry James and John Bailey, and in more recent times, Anthony Powell, Siegfried Sassoon, A. A. Milne, Kingsley Amis, John Gross, Antonia Fraser, Tom Stoppard, Patrick Leigh Fermor, Claire Tomalin, Charles Moore, Miriam Gross, V. S. Naipaul, Sebastian Faulks, Antony Beevor and P. D. James.

The Literary Society has not obtruded on public notice, with the brief exception of its meetings and personalities in the middle of the twentieth century which were regularly documented in the Lyttelton/Hart-Davis Letters, in which are frequent vignettes of the members of the 1950s and 60s, including John Betjeman, T. S. Eliot, Malcolm Sargent, Alan Lascelles and Lord Dunsany.

In a bicentennial article in The Spectator in April 2007, Charles Moore wrote, of the variety of the Society’s membership:

There have been composers (Elgar and Parry), historians such as G. M. Trevelyan and Froude, the architects Butterfield and Herbert Baker, Kenneth Clark (of Civilisation), Harold Nicolson, Alfred Milner the imperialist, Herschel the astronomer, Garnet Wolseley the general, Roy Jenkins, A. P. Herbert, two Archbishops of Canterbury (Davidson and Lang), and three Prime Ministers – A. J. Balfour, Stanley Baldwin and Harold Macmillan.

There is a maximum of 60 members at any time. Women members were first elected in 2000.
