= Early life and career of Robert Stewart, Duke of Albany =

Scottish prince and statesman (died 1420)

Robert Stewart, Duke of Albany (1339–1420) was a younger son of Robert II of Scotland (and great-grandson of Robert the Bruce) who was de facto ruler of Scotland for several years, during three periods as regent during the reigns of Robert II, Robert III and James I.

This article covers the period from his birth down to the start of his first period as regent in 1388.

== Birth ==
Robert was born in 1339. He was his parents' third son. Robert was named after his father, Robert Stewart, High Steward of Scotland, a grandson of Robert the Bruce and the heir presumptive to the Scottish throne. His mother was Elizabeth Mure, the daughter of Adam Mure of Rowallan, a landowner in Ayrshire. Robert's parents had been married in a traditional ceremony, which was not recognized by the Catholic Church. Robert's great-uncle, King David II, was captured by English forces at the Battle of Neville's Cross in 1346, after which his father was elected as regent of Scotland. In 1347, Robert's father appealed to Pope Clement VI for the legitimization of his children with Elizabeth Mure. This petition, which was supported by Philip VI of France and several Scottish bishops, was successful, and Robert was legitimized along with his siblings at the age of eight. Robert's parents did not officially remarry until 1349. Robert's mother probably died during the early 1350s.

The prominence of Robert's family in Scottish politics was confirmed in 1357, when his father, Robert the Steward, was created Earl of Strathearn after the return of David II from his captivity in England. David II was forced to pay a ransom of 100,000 merks for his release from the custody of Edward III of England, whose army had defeated him at Neville's Cross. Robert was probably sent to England as one of the mandated hostages for his great-uncle's ransom in 1358. Robert's detention in England was brief. He returned to Scotland shortly afterwards, leaving his eldest brother, John Stewart of Kyle, to remain in England as a hostage until 1360.

== First marriage ==
Robert married Margaret Graham, Countess of Menteith, as her fourth husband, before September 1361. Their first child, Murdoch, was born around 1362. Robert secured a political alliance with Duncan, Earl of Lennox, by naming the earl as Murdoch's godfather. Robert's marriage to Margaret brought him into conflict with the Drummond family, whose head, John Drummond of Concraig, had briefly been married to Margaret before his death in 1360. Robert himself had probably already planned to marry Margaret before 1360. Robert's opposition towards Margaret's marriage to Drummond may have led his great-uncle, David II, to unsuccessfully attempt to return him as a hostage to England in c. 1360. Robert's alliance with Duncan, Earl of Lennox, in 1362 likely represented an attempt to strengthen his position against the Drummonds. David II expressed his opposition to Robert's marriage by denying him the title of Earl of Menteith. Robert was instead forced to style himself as Lord of Menteith. The king probably regarded his marriage to Margaret Drummond, the sister of Robert's rival John Drummond, in 1364 as a challenge to the power of the Stewart family.

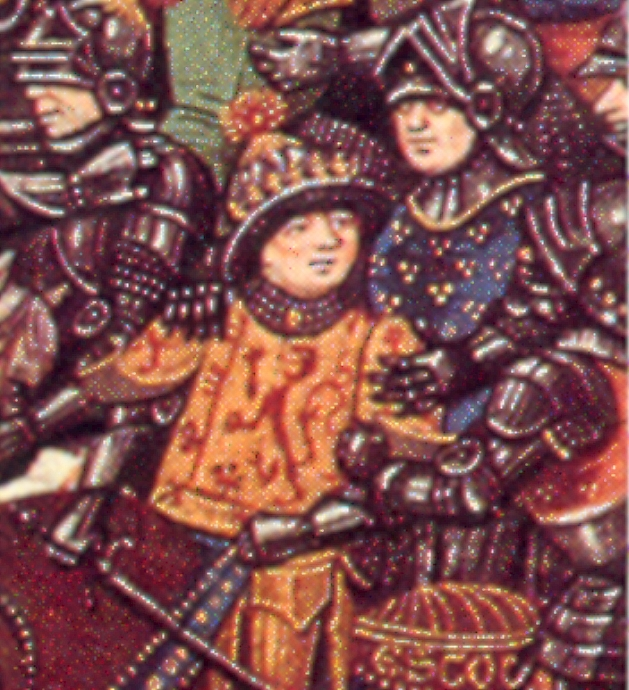
Robert's great-uncle, David II of Scotland, whom he rebelled against in 1363.

== Rebellion of 1363 ==
Robert joined his eldest brother, John, and his father, Robert the Steward, in a rebellion against David II early in 1363. At the beginning of the rebellion, Robert's father formed a coalition against the king alongside William Douglas, Earl of Douglas, and Patrick Dunbar, Earl of March. Thomas Grey, the contemporary English author who had extensive knowledge of Scotland, claimed that the rebels opposed David's misuse of the funds which had been raised by the Scottish parliament for his ransom. The rebellion against David was more likely sparked by the local political concerns of the nobility. Robert's father opposed David's interference in the earldom of Fife, where Robert's elder brother, Walter, had briefly married Isabella, Countess of Fife. After Walter's death in 1362, the king forced Isabella to marry the crusader Thomas Bisset, a prominent knight at the royal court. Besides his father's dispute with David over Fife, Robert himself was probably angered by the marriage of Archibald the Grim, the king's favorite knight, to Joanna Murray in 1362. As the daughter of Maurice, Earl of Strathearn, Joanna was the heiress to considerable lands in Menteith, and the marriage disrupted Robert's own claims to the earldom by right of his wife.

William, Earl of Douglas, who had recently been excluded from David's court, likely led the armed opposition to the king. Deploying an army of paid retainers and cavalry, David defeated the rebellion during the spring of 1363. Robert's father was forced to submit to David at Inchmurdoch on 14 May 1363. In his oath of submission to the king, Robert's father mentioned Robert by name in promising to revoke his agreements with various members of the nobility. During the rebellion, Robert may have fought against Archibald the Grim, who supported the king, over their competing claims to the Murray inheritance in Menteith.

== Later reign of David II ==
David II, whose position within Scotland had been strengthened by his defeat of the rebellion, was proposing by 1364 that his English ransom should be canceled in exchange for the recognition of either John of Gaunt or Lionel of Antwerp, the younger sons of Edward III of England, as heir presumptive to the Scottish throne. David's plans for the Scottish succession were a direct threat against the right of Robert's father to inherit the throne. In March 1364, the Parliament of Scotland rejected David's proposals during a meeting at Scone Abbey. Despite this political defeat, the years after 1364 represented the peak of David's personal power, as the king dealt harshly with noblemen who challenged his authority.

Robert attended the parliament held at Scone in September 1367. Robert was named, alongside his father, as one of the noblemen who would remain at Scone to conduct the business of parliament, while other members of the nobility returned home for the harvest. Robert appeared at another parliament at Scone in June 1368, where he demanded that Archibald the Grim, his rival for the Murray inheritance in Menteith, surrender his jure uxoris claims to the lands of his wife, Joanna Murray. Prior to the parliament of 1368, Archibald had apparently promised to consider Robert's claims to the Murray inheritance. David II dismissed Robert's lawsuit against Archibald, ordering both Robert and Archibald to argue their cases in a lesser court than parliament.

David II, who was now in conflict with John, Lord of the Isles, attended the parliament of 1368 in person, where he warned Robert "in his own voice" not to aid John's supporters. Robert's father and elder brother were also included in this warning. Robert and his family had likely offered support in c. 1368 to John, Lord of the Isles, who had previously married Robert's aunt, Margaret. Robert's father probably negotiated John's submission to the king in 1369. Robert was summoned to parliament at Perth in March 1369, where he swore an oath to uphold law and order in the earldom of Menteith, probably in connection with the conflict in the north. Robert, his elder brother, and his father were faced with the penalties of treason for disobeying this oath. Robert's father was imprisoned by David II at Lochleven Castle around this time, possibly as a result of the Stewart family's alliance with John, Lord of the Isles. Robert himself may have been briefly imprisoned, while his younger brother, Alexander, was certainly sent to Lochleven alongside their father.

The Stewart family faced a difficult political situation by 1371. The childless David II, who had divorced his second wife, Margaret Drummond, was now planning to marry Agnes Dunbar, likely with the intention of conceiving a Bruce heir. Agnes' brother, John Dunbar, secured the title of Lord of Fife, with the king's support, in 1370. Dunbar's elevation in the earldom of Fife probably angered Robert, who likely hoped to claim Fife as the heir by entail to his deceased elder brother, Walter. David II also secured Dunbar's marriage to Robert's sister, Marjory, which was unsuccessfully opposed by Robert's father. A second major rebellion against the king seemed likely.

== Death of David II ==
This potential conflict was averted when David II died at Edinburgh Castle on 22 February 1371.

After this, Robert's father, Robert the Steward, succeeded as King of Scots as the son of Marjorie Bruce, a daughter of Robert the Bruce. Robert's father was crowned as King Robert II at Scone Abbey on 26 March 1371. Robert attended the coronation, where he swore a personal oath of fealty to his father. By the time of the coronation, Robert's father had already allowed him to assume the full title of Earl of Menteith. Robert abandoned the lesser style of "Lord", which he had been forced to adopt by David II.

== Acquisition of Fife ==
The recognition of Robert's full rights in Menteith was the prelude to his rapid rise to prominence in Scotland. Robert's ascendance was supported by his father, Robert II, as part of the king's policy of establishing each of his sons as great noblemen, with significant lands and titles. Robert met with Isabella, Countess of Fife, in Perth, shortly after his father's coronation. At this meeting, Robert secured Isabella's support for his claims to the earldom of Fife, as heir to his elder brother, Walter, who had briefly been married to Isabella. Robert probably also based his claims to Fife on his legal rights as the ultimate heir to Alan, Earl of Menteith, the grandfather of Robert's wife, Margaret, Countess of Menteith, and a cousin of Duncan, Earl of Fife. Despite Isabella's support for his claims to Fife, Robert's legal dispute with the nominal Lord of Fife, John Dunbar, lasted for more than a year. In 1372, Robert's father helped negotiate a political compromise, whereby Robert assumed the title of Earl of Fife and Dunbar was created Earl of Moray in compensation. Robert was calling himself Earl of Fife by April 1372. Robert's acquisition of Fife reflected his status as one of the most important noblemen in Scotland, second only to his eldest brother, John, Earl of Carrick, the heir to the throne. As Earl of Fife, Robert became the de jure chief of Clan MacDuff.

Robert's newfound prominence in Scotland was signaled in 1373, when the Parliament of Scotland declared that Robert and his eldest son, Murdoch, would have precedence in the royal succession over Robert's nieces, Margaret and Elizabeth, the daughters of his eldest brother, John, Earl of Carrick. Robert's rivalry with his eldest brother, which may have begun with John's marriage to Annabella Drummond, the daughter of Robert's former competitor for influence in the earldom of Menteith, was probably fueled by the succession law of 1373. Robert was the main beneficiary of the new law. Robert was second in line to the Scottish throne until the birth of his nephew, David, in 1378.

Robert was given custody of Stirling Castle, one of the most important castles in Scotland, by his father in 1373. Robert earned an annual pension of 200 merks for his keepership of Stirling. In order to secure his hold on Stirling, Robert entered into a bond of friendship with the castle's previous custodian, Robert Erskine, who had been a prominent courtier under David II

== Increasing prominence ==
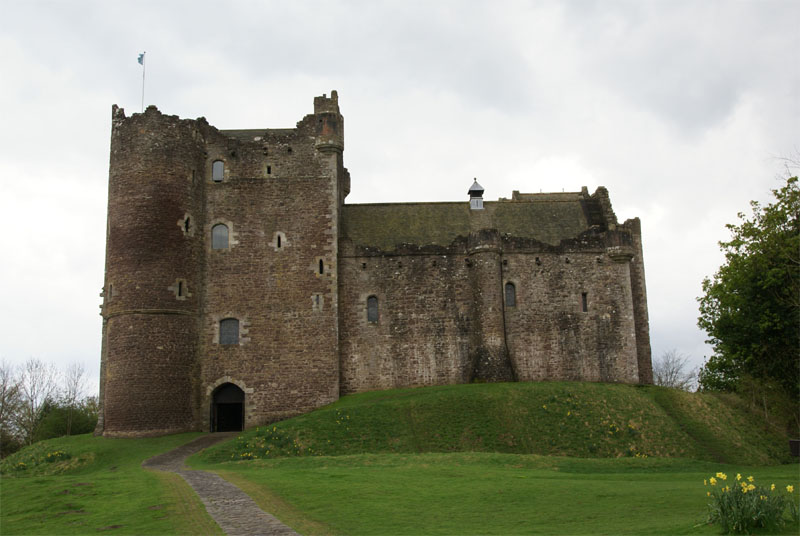
Doune Castle, which Robert built beginning in the 1370s, still stands today.

Probably during the early 1370s, Robert began the construction of Doune Castle, which became the seat of his earldom of Menteith. Robert built Doune as an impressive residence, which was designed to project his power and prestige to guests and onlookers. The castle included a large great hall, with a decorated fireplace and a musicians' gallery. Robert's focus on defensive construction was reflected in Doune's unusually high walls. He ensured that the portcullis of the castle could only be controlled from within his own private quarters, which included a solar and several bedrooms. Robert probably intended his new castle at Doune to serve as a compliment to nearby Stirling Castle, which he controlled after 1373. Robert was resident at Doune by 1381, indicating that the castle had been substantially completed by that time.

Robert's construction of Doune allowed him to consolidate his hold on Menteith. Robert sought to reinforce his power in Menteith by acquiring the lands surrounding the earldom. He had obtained control of Glen Dochart by 1376. After acquiring Glen Dochart, Robert may have begun to patronize the local cult of St. Fillan. Robert's anxiety over his position in Menteith was probably driven by the death of his wife, Margaret, Countess of Menteith, on an unknown date in c. 1376. Robert continued to use the title of Earl of Menteith after his wife's death, and successfully ignored the rights of his wife's children by John Drummond to inherit Menteith, likely with his father's support. Around this time, Robert also began a dispute with John Logie, the cousin of his sister-in-law, Annabella Drummond, over the valuable lands of Strath Gartney. Despite Robert's dispute with Logie, he was frequently in the company of John, Earl of Carrick, his eldest brother and Annabella's husband, during this period, suggesting a measure of political harmony between the two men.

Robert participated in march days, meetings of Scottish and English representatives to settle disputes in the Debatable Lands, alongside his eldest brother during the late 1370s. In 1378, Robert and his younger brother, David, Earl of Strathearn, fought alongside Archibald the Grim in a battle at Melrose against an English raiding party. Robert's cooperation with Archibald in the 1378 campaign signaled the improved relationship between the two men. Robert was probably more inclined to work with Archibald after the decision by his father, Robert II, to recognize Archibald's claim to the Murray inheritance, which Robert had previously contested.

== Second marriage ==
Robert's first wife, Margaret, Countess of Menteith, who was last recorded in 1372, had died before 1380. In May 1380, Robert obtained a dispensation from the Avignon antipope, Clement VII, to marry Muriella Keith, a daughter of William Keith, the hereditary Great Marischal of Scotland. Little is known about Muriella. Robert's eldest child by Muriella, John, was born in c. 1381. Robert developed a close relationship with his father-in-law, William Keith, after 1380, and the two men were frequently in each other's company. Robert's marriage to Muriella allowed him to develop a close political alliance with the Keith family, which was influential in northeastern Scotland. Robert's support enabled William Keith to build a tower house at Dunnottar.

== Brother's seizure of power ==
Robert became Chamberlain of Scotland in 1382, after the assassination of the previous chamberlain, John Lyon of Glamis. Lyon's assassin, James Lindsay of Crawford, had been in the presence of Robert and other noblemen, including Robert's eldest brother, several days before the murder. Lindsay himself was Robert's first cousin. Lyon's death reflected the growing political tension between his patron and employer, Robert II, and the king's eldest son, John, Earl of Carrick. Robert's elevation to the office of chamberlain confirmed his close relationship with his eldest brother around this time.

By 1382, Robert II was facing opposition to his rule from powerful segments of the Scottish nobility, most notability the affinity of his eldest son, John, Earl of Carrick, along with various members of the Douglas family. The king was criticized for his controversial promotion of his fourth son, Robert's younger brother Alexander, in the earldom of Ross in 1382. The king secured Alexander's marriage to the widowed Euphemia, Countess of Ross, probably against Euphemia's own wishes. Alexander's usage of cateran warriors to control his lands sparked considerable controversy in Scotland, which also damaged the king's political standing. Meanwhile, a period of developing conflict between Scotland and England led directly to an English invasion of Scotland in 1384. The English army, led by John of Gaunt, the uncle of Richard II of England, devastated the region of East Lothian. Robert II was criticized for his response to the English invasion, which was viewed as prevaricating and indecisive. John, Earl of Carrick, the king's eldest son, took advantage of his father's political difficulties to seize power in November 1384. During a general council at Holyrood Abbey, Robert II effectively abdicated much of his authority to his eldest son, who was named as Guardian of Scotland.

Robert attended the general council of 1384, where he swore an oath to support his eldest brother's assumption of power. Despite his initial support for the regency, Robert's interests were threatened by his brother's rule of Scotland. John, Earl of Carrick, challenged Robert on multiple fronts. Significant tensions existed between Robert and his brother by 1385, when Robert was forced to surrender his claim to the lands of Strath Gartney to John Logie, a cousin of his sister-in-law, Annabella Drummond. Robert does not seem to have actually resigned these lands until 1387, indicating resistance on his part to Logie's successful claim. John, Earl of Carrick, also abused his position as guardian to take large sums of money from the Scottish exchequer. Robert's authority as Chamberlain of Scotland was threatened by his brother's actions. Robert, probably supported by the king, gained substantial control over the exchequer session of 1385, held at Stirling Castle, where he punished the financial officials who had submitted to his brother. Robert's brother meanwhile faced criticism for his failure to curb the territorial or official power of their controversial younger brother, Alexander, in northern Scotland.

== Conflict with England ==
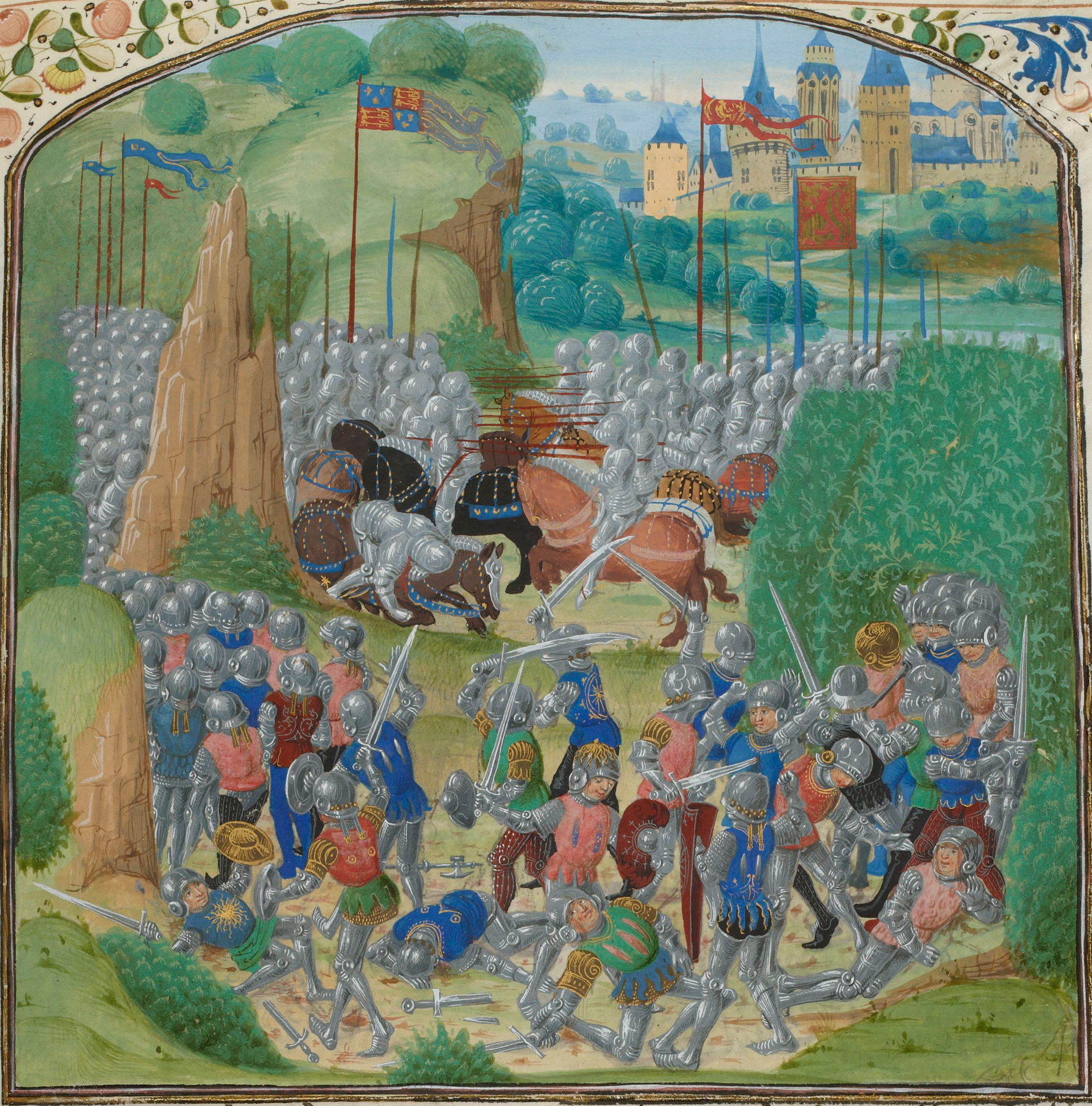
The Battle of Otterburn in 1388, which allowed Robert to outmaneuver his eldest brother for the regency.

The Anglo-Scottish conflict was resumed in 1385, amidst the ongoing Hundred Years' War between England and France. Jean de Vienne, Admiral of France, arrived in Scotland in May 1385 with an expeditionary force of French knights, along with a large sum of money which was distributed among Robert, his eldest brother, and other Scottish noblemen. Robert joined the combined Franco-Scottish army that invaded England during the summer of 1385, attacking Wark Castle and Ford Castle. Andrew of Wyntoun compared Robert to his great-grandfather, Robert the Bruce, for his role in the campaign of 1385. This Scottish attack led directly to a massive retaliatory English invasion, led personally by Richard II of England. The English army burned Edinburgh and other Scottish towns, after which an Anglo-Scottish truce was agreed. This truce was renewed several times, ultimately lasting until 1388.

Robert played a significant role in the renewal of war with England in 1388. Joined by James, Earl of Douglas, and Archibald the Grim, Robert led a Scottish army in an attack on Cockermouth in the summer of that year. After the raid on Cockermouth, the decision was apparently taken to divide the Scottish army into eastern and western forces. Robert led the western army in an attack on Carlisle on 3 August 1388. The eastern army, led by James, Earl of Douglas, confronted an English force at the Battle of Otterburn on 5 August, where the earl was killed in the resulting Scottish victory. The death of James, Earl of Douglas, deprived Robert's eldest brother, John, Earl of Carrick, of his most powerful supporter among the Scottish nobility. In the aftermath of the earl's death, Robert supported the claim of his former rival, Archibald the Grim, to the earldom of Douglas. Robert also took advantage of the legal chaos caused by the earl's death to claim control of Tantallon Castle, which was granted to him by his father, Robert II, at a meeting of the Scottish parliament later in August 1388.

== Start of first regency ==
In 1388 Robert started his first period as regent.

== Sources ==
- Boardman, Stephen (1996). The Early Stewart Kings: Robert II and Robert III, 1371–1406. Edinburgh: Tuckwell Press. ISBN 978 1 904607 68 7.
- Brown, Michael (1994). James I (First ed.). Canongate Press. ISBN 1-898410-40-2.
- Brown, Michael (1998). The Black Douglases: War and Lordship in Medieval Scotland (Second ed.). Tuckwell Press. ISBN 1-86232-036-5.
- Cannon, John; Hargreaves, Anne (2009). The Kings and Queens of Britain (Second ed.). Oxford University Press. ISBN 978-0-19-955922-0.
- Cannon, John; Cowcroft, Robert (2015). A Dictionary of British History (Third ed.). Oxford University Press. ISBN 978-0-19-175802-7.
- Davidson, John (1878). Inverurie and The Earldom of the Garioch: A Topographical and Historical Account of the Garioch from Earliest times to the Revolution Settlement. Aberdeen: A. Brown and Company.
- Penman, Michael (2004). David II. East Linton: Tuckwell Press. ISBN 1-86232-202-3.
- Penman, Michael (2006). The Kings and Queens of Scotland (Second ed.). Stroud, Gloucestershire, UK: The History Press. ISBN 978-0-7524-3814-6.
- Nicholson, Ranald (1974). Scotland: The Later Middle Ages (Second ed.). Edinburgh: Mercat Press. ISBN 0-901824-84-4.
- Simpson, W. Douglas (1938). "Doune Castle". Proceedings of the Society of Antiquaries of Scotland. 72: 73–83. doi:10.9750/PSAS.072.73.83.
- Thomson, Thomas; Annandale, Charles (2023). A History of the Scottish People from the Earliest Times - Volume 2 (Reprint ed.). Legare Street Press.
