= Isabella, Countess of Fife =

Scottish noblewoman (c. 1320–1389)

- Born: Approx. 1320-1332
- Died: shortly after 12 August 1389 (aged 68–69)
- Spouse: William de Felton; Walter Stewart; Sir Thomas Bisset of Upsetlington
- Father: Duncan, Earl of Fife
- Mother: Mary de Monthermer

Isabella MacDuff, Countess of Fife (c. 1320–1389) was a Scottish noblewoman who was Countess of Fife from 1363 until she resigned the title in 1371. She was the only child of Duncan, Earl of Fife, by his wife Mary de Monthermer, daughter of Ralph, Lord Monthermer and Princess Joan, thereby making her also the great-granddaughter of King Edward I of England.

In 1332 she and her mother had been captured at Perth by supporters of Edward Balliol. She was sent as a ward to Northumberland.

Her first husband was Sir William Felton of Northumberland in Fife, whom she married around 1330/35. He died in 1358, leaving her with three children. She was next married, before June 1361, to Walter Stewart, second son of Robert Stewart, later King Robert II. He died without issue the following year, and she was married again in January 1363 to Sir Thomas Bisset of Upsetlington in Berwickshire. He had died by April 1366. She was married for a fourth and final time to John Dunbar, who died before 1371.

Isabel was persuaded to resign the earldom on 30 March 1371 to Robert Stewart, Earl of Menteith (later Duke of Albany), who was her brother-in-law by her second marriage. She died shortly after 12 August 1389 and was buried next to Walter Stewart.

Scotland in the fourteenth century had no shortages of heiresses. The great earldoms of the country, frequently in some cases, passed through and into the hands of dowagers and heiresses at various points in the late Middle Ages. Across Europe events such as plague or ongoing warfare had an adverse effect on the male population, and so, noblewomen and their position in society, law, and politics became an increasingly urgent question. Isabella of Fife's position as a woman with significant land, wealth and potential influence was not a unique one.

== Ancestry ==
Ancestors of Isabella, Countess of Fife

8. Colban, Earl of Fife
4. Duncan, Earl of Fife
9. Anna Durward
2. Duncan, Earl of Fife
10. Gilbert, Earl of Hertford
5. Johanna de Clare
11. Alice de Lusignan of Angoulême
1. Isabella, Countess of Fife
6. Ralph, Lord Monthermer
3. Mary de Monthermer
14. Edward I, King of England
7. Joan of Acre
15. Eleanor of Castile

== Sources ==
- Grant, Rev'd Alexander, "The Ancient Earls of Fife", in Sir James Balfour Paul (ed.) The Scots Peerage, Volume IV, (Edinburgh, 1907), pp. 13-14
- Gray, Thomas, Scalacronica (pub. 1911)
- Boardman, Steve, The Early Stewart Kings, Robert II and Robert III (1996), ch. 1, esp. p. 13 ff.

Preceded by Duncan	Countess of Fife; 1363–1371	Succeeded by Robert Stewart
