= Robert III of Scotland =

King of Scotland from 1390 to 1406

Robert III
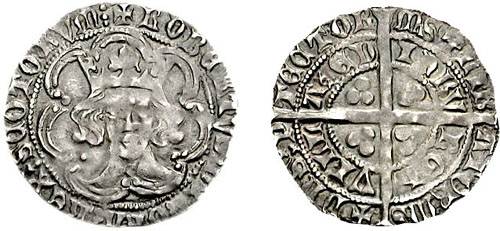
- Groat of 1390 bearing a crowned facing effigy of Robert III on the obverse

King of Scots
- Reign: 19 April 1390 – 4 April 1406
- Coronation: 14 August 1390
- Predecessor: Robert II
- Successor: James I
- Regents: See list: Robert Stewart, Earl of Fife (1390–1393); David Stewart, Duke of Rothesay (1399–1401); Robert Stewart, Duke of Albany (1401–1406)
- Born: John Stewart c. 5 March 1337
- Died: 4 April 1406 (aged 68–69); Rothesay Castle, Isle of Bute, Scotland
- Burial: Paisley Abbey
- Spouse: Annabella Drummond (m. 1367; died 1401)
- Issue more...: Margaret Stewart, Duchess of Touraine; Elizabeth Stewart; David Stewart, Duke of Rothesay; Mary Stewart; James I, King of Scots
- House: Stewart
- Father: Robert II of Scotland
- Mother: Elizabeth Mure
- Events: 1363 During the early months along with his father and others, he was part of an abortive insurrection against David II; 1371 27 March, Robert II crowned at Scone Abbey; 1384 November, Carrick engineered his appointment as guardian of the kingdom sidelining the King; 1388 1 December, Carrick lost guardianship to his younger brother Robert, Earl of Fife; 1390 19 April, Robert II died at Dundonald Castle 14 August, Carrick crowned as Robert III but without power and Fife retains guardianship; 1393 Ruling powers restored to the King with his elder son David undertaking a more influential role; 1399 January, David (now Duke of Rothesay) appointed Lieutenant of Scotland to rule for three years but under supervision of a group led by Fife (now Duke of Albany); 1401 Probably late in the year, arrested by Albany; 1402 25–27 March, Rothesay dies in custody but parliament exonerates Albany; 1405-6 Sometime during that winter the King had decided to send his remaining son, James, to France for safe-keeping; 1406 22 March, James's ship bound for France was intercepted by the English and the prince began his eighteen-year captivity 4 April, the ailing King Robert died after learning of his son's fate

Robert III (c. 1337 – 4 April 1406), born John Stewart, was King of Scots from 1390 to his death in 1406. He was also High Steward of Scotland from 1371 to 1390 and held the titles of Earl of Atholl (1367–1390) and Earl of Carrick (1368–1390) before ascending the throne at the age of about 53 years. He was the eldest son of King Robert II and Elizabeth Mure and was legitimised by his parents' second marriage through papal dispensation in 1349.

John joined his father and other magnates in a rebellion against his great-uncle David II early in 1363 but submitted to him soon afterwards. He was married to Annabella Drummond by 1367. In 1368, David created him Earl of Carrick. His father became king in 1371 after the unexpected death of the childless King David II. In the following years, Carrick was influential in the kingdom's governance but became impatient with his father's longevity. In 1384, Carrick was appointed the king's lieutenant after swaying the general council to remove Robert II from direct rule. Carrick's administration saw a renewal of the conflict with England. In 1388, the Scots defeated the English at the Battle of Otterburn, where the Scots' commander, James, Earl of Douglas, was killed. By this time, Carrick had been badly injured from a horse kick; however, it was the loss of his powerful ally, Douglas, that saw a turnaround in magnate support in favour of his younger brother Robert, Earl of Fife, to whom the council transferred the lieutenancy in December 1388.

In 1390, Robert II died, and Carrick ascended the throne as Robert III, but without authority to rule directly. Fife continued as Lieutenant until February 1393, when power was returned to the king jointly with his son David. At a council in 1399, owing to the king's "sickness of his person", David, now Duke of Rothesay, became Lieutenant under the supervision of a special parliamentary group dominated by Fife, now styled Duke of Albany. After this, Robert III withdrew to his lands in the west and, for a time, played little or no part in affairs of state. He was powerless to interfere when a dispute between Albany and Rothesay arose in 1401, leading to Rothesay's imprisonment and death in March 1402. The general council absolved Albany from blame and reappointed him as Lieutenant. The only impediment now remaining to an Albany Stewart monarchy was the king's only surviving son, James, Earl of Carrick. After a clash with Albany's Douglas allies in 1406, the 11-year-old James tried to escape to France. The vessel was intercepted, and James became the prisoner of Henry IV of England. Robert III died shortly after learning of his heir's imprisonment.

== Early life ==
John Stewart was born around the year 1337 to Robert, Steward of Scotland, and heir presumptive to the throne, and his wife Elizabeth Mure. Robert's mother Marjorie and her half-brother, David II, were the children of the first Bruce king, Robert I.

Robert Stewart and Elizabeth Mure were married in 1336, which was regarded as uncanonical by the church. They married for the second time in 1349, after receiving a papal dispensation from Pope Clement VI dated 22 November 1347. Therefore, their children, John, his three brothers and six sisters, were now legitimised. Styled Lord of Kyle, John is first recorded in the 1350s as the commander of a campaign in the Lordship of Annandale to re-establish Scottish control over English-occupied territory. In 1363, he joined his father along with the earls of Douglas and March in a failed insurrection against Robert's uncle, David II. The reasons for the rebellion were varied. In 1362, David II supported several of his royal favourites in their titles to lands in the Stewart earldom of Monteith and thwarted Stewart claims to the earldom of Fife. The King's involvement and eventual marriage to Margaret Drummond may also have represented a threat in the Steward's own earldom of Strathearn, where the Drummonds also had interests, while Douglas and March mistrusted David's intentions towards them. These nobles were also unhappy at the king's squandering of funds provided to him for his ransom, and with the prospect that they could be sent to England as guarantors for the ransom payments. The friction between the King and the Stewarts looked to have been settled before the end of spring 1367.

Blason of John, Earl of Carrick

On 31 May 1367, the Steward resigned the earldom of Atholl to John, who by this time was already married to Annabella Drummond, the daughter of the queen's deceased brother, Sir John Drummond. David II reinforced the position of John and Annabella by providing them with the Earldom of Carrick on 22 June 1368 and the tacit approval of John as the king's probable heir. A Stewart succession was suddenly endangered when David II had his marriage to Margaret annulled in March 1369, leaving the king free to remarry and with the prospect of a Bruce heir.

On 22 February 1371, David II (who was preparing to marry the Earl of March's sister, Agnes Dunbar) unexpectedly died, presumably to the relief of both John and his father. Robert was crowned at Scone Abbey on 27 March 1371, and before this date, he had given John — now styled Steward of Scotland — the ancestral lands surrounding the Firth of Clyde. How the succession was to take place was first entailed by Robert I when female heirs were excluded; David II attempted unsuccessfully on several occasions to have the council change the succession procedure. Robert II quickly moved to ensure the succession of John when the general council attending his coronation officially named Carrick as heir. In 1373, the Stewart succession was further strengthened when parliament passed entails defining how each of the king's sons could inherit the crown. After the coronation John Dunbar who had received the Lordship of Fife from David II now resigned the title so that the king's second son, Robert, Earl of Monteith could receive the Earldom of Fife — Dunbar was compensated with the provision of the earldom of Moray.

A son, David, the future Duke of Rothesay, was born to Carrick and Annabella on 24 October 1378. In 1381, Carrick adopted the title "lieutenant for the marches", sustained by his connections to border magnates such as his brother-in-law, James Douglas, son of William, Earl of Douglas, whom he succeeded in 1384.

== Guardianship — and its collapse ==
Robert II's policy of building up Stewart domination in Scotland through the advancement of his sons saw the emergence of Carrick as the pre-eminent Stewart magnate south of the Forth-Clyde line, just as his younger brother Alexander, Earl of Buchan, Lord of Badenoch and Ross had become in the north.

... considering that there are, and have been now for a considerable time, great and numerous defects in the governing of the kingdom by reason of the king's disposition, both by reason of age and for other reasons, and the infirmity of the lord his firstborn son ... have amicably chosen Sir [Robert Stewart], earl of Fife, second-born son of the king, and brother german of the same lord the firstborn son, [as] guardian of the kingdom under the king, ... for putting into effect justice and keeping the law internally, and for the defence of the kingdom with the king's force, as set out before, against those attempting to rise up as enemies.

— Records of the Parliaments of Scotland to 1707, 1 December 1388, Edinburgh. http://www.rps.ac.uk/

Before 1384, persistent objections regarding Robert II's application of the law were brought to the council's attention. Some of these grievances maintained that the King had acted unlawfully by deliberately disregarding charges regarding his personal conduct. Buchan's use of cateran supporters drew criticism from Northern nobles and prelates and demonstrated Robert II's inability or reluctance to control his son. The king's failure to take a leading role in prosecuting the war with England and Buchan's abuse of royal power in the north was the backdrop to the general council meeting at Holyrood Abbey in November 1384, where the decision was taken to sideline the king and provide the ruling powers to Carrick as Guardian of Scotland.

Within weeks Carrick's actions signalled changes in the direction of crown strategy where the Carrick–Douglas affinity was, by far, the largest group to benefit from crown patronage. On 13 March 1385 it emerged that an unauthorised payment of £700 in bullion, a huge amount, had been taken by the guardian from the customs of Edinburgh. It transpired that Fife, also Chamberlain of Scotland, had been struggling to check Carrick's misuse of the Crown finances during 1384–1385.

In April 1385, the general council sharply condemned Buchan's behaviour and sat intending to manoeuvre Carrick into firmly intervening in the north. In July, under Carrick's guardianship, a Scottish army that included a French force commanded by Admiral Jean de Vienne penetrated the north of England without any serious gains but provoked a damaging retaliatory attack by Richard II. Yet in the north, Carrick did not bring Buchan under control and many of the Guardian's supporters although pleased at the resumption of hostilities with England were unhappy at the continued northern lawlessness. Carrick had been made Guardian partly on the need to curb Buchan's excesses yet despite this by February 1387 Buchan had become even more powerful and influential when he was appointed Justiciar north of the Forth.

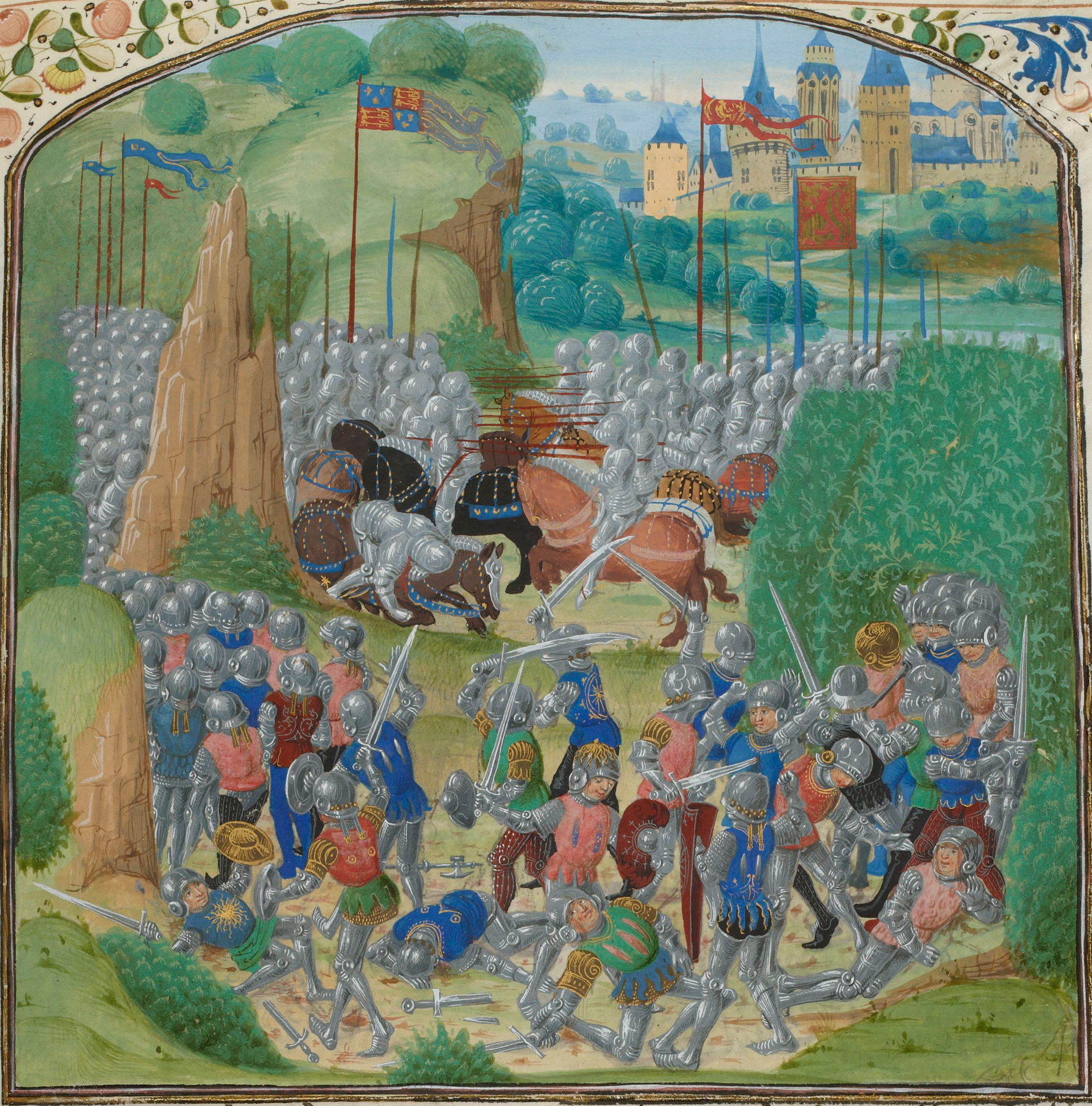
Battle of Otterburn

The war with England was halted by a series of truces, finally on 19 April 1388. English envoys sent to Scotland to extend the ceasefire returned to Richard's court empty-handed — by 29 April, Robert II was conducting a council in Edinburgh to authorise renewed conflict with England. Although the Scots army defeated the English at the Battle of Otterburn in Northumberland in August 1388, its leader, the Earl of Douglas, was killed. Douglas died childless, triggering a series of claims on his estate — Carrick backed his brother-in-law Malcolm Drummond, the husband of Douglas's sister, while his brother, Robert Earl of Fife, took the side of Sir Archibald Douglas, Lord of Galloway, who held an entail on his kinsman's estates, and who ultimately succeeded to the earldom. Fife, with his new powerful Douglas ally, together with those loyal to the king, ensured at the December 1388 council meeting that the guardianship of Scotland would pass from Carrick (who had recently been badly injured from a horse-kick) to Fife.

There was general approval of Fife's intention to properly resolve the situation of lawlessness in the north and, in particular, the activities of Buchan, his younger brother. Buchan was stripped of his position of justiciar, which would soon be given to Fife's son, Murdoch Stewart. In January 1390 Robert II was in the north-east perhaps to strengthen the now changed political outlook in that region. He returned to Dundonald Castle in Ayrshire in March where he died on 19 April and was buried at Scone on 25 April.

== Reign ==
In diebus illis non erat lex in Scocia sed quilibet potencior minorem oppressit et totum regnum fuit unum latrocinium. Homicidia depredaciones et incendia et cetera maleficia remanserunt inpunita et justicia utlegata extra regni terminos exulavit.

In those days there was no law in Scotland, but the strong oppressed the weak, and the whole kingdom was one den of thieves. Homicides, robberies, fire-raisings, and other misdeeds remained unpunished, and justice seemed banished beyond the kingdom's bounds.

— The Chartularium Episcopatus Moraviensis written at Elgin Cathedral for the year 1398

In May 1390, less than a month after becoming king, parliament granted John permission to change his regnal name to Robert, probably in part to maintain the link back to Robert I but also to disassociate himself from King John Balliol. The four-month delay in the crowning of Robert III can be seen as a period when Fife and his affinity sought to ensure their future positions, and which also saw Buchan's opportunistic attack on Elgin Cathedral, settling an old score with the Bishop of Moray, and possibly also a protest at Fife's reappointment as the king's lieutenant.

=== Rothesay's lieutenancy ===
In 1392, Robert III strengthened the position of his son David, now Earl of Carrick, when he endowed him with a large annuity that allowed the young prince to build up his household and affinity, and then in 1393 regained his right to direct rule when the general council decided that Fife's lieutenancy should end and that Carrick, now of age, should assist his father. This independence of action was demonstrated in 1395–1396, when he responded to Carrick's unauthorised marriage to Elizabeth Dunbar, daughter of George, Earl of March, by ensuring its annulment. The king appears to have also taken over the conduct of foreign affairs, preserving the peace with Richard II and managing to increase the power of the Red Douglas Earl of Angus in the southeast of the country as a counterbalance to Fife's Black Douglas ally. He further demonstrated his authority when, attempting to reduce inter-clan feuding and lawlessness, he arranged and oversaw a trial by combat between the clans of Kay and Quhele (Clan Chattan) in Perth on 28 April 1396. Carrick increasingly acted independently of his father, taking control of the Stewart lands in the south‑west while maintaining his ties to his mother's Drummond kin, and all at a time when Fife's influence in central Scotland remained strong.

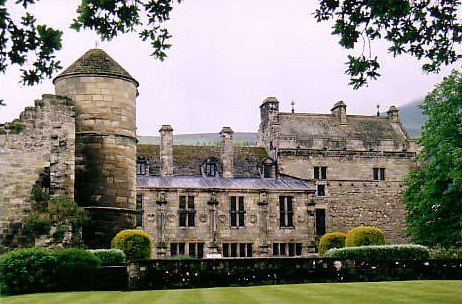
Falkland Palace was built close to the site of Falkland Castle

The king was increasingly blamed for his failure to pacify the Gaelic areas in the west and north. The general council held in Perth in April 1398 criticised the king's governance. It empowered his brother Robert and his son David — now respectively the Dukes of Albany and Rothesay — to lead an army against Donald, Lord of the Isles, and his brothers. In November 1398, an influential group of magnates and prelates met at Falkland Castle, among them Albany, Rothesay, Archibald, Earl of Douglas, Albany's son Murdoch, the justiciar north of the Forth, and the bishops Walter of St Andrews and Gilbert of Aberdeen. The consequences of this gathering became evident at the council meeting of January 1399, when the king was compelled to surrender power to Rothesay for three years.

The kin of the border earls took advantage of the confusion in England after the deposition of Richard II by Henry IV and harried and forayed into England, causing much damage, and taking Wark Castle around 13 October 1399. A far-reaching dispute between Rothesay and George Dunbar, Earl of March, occurred when Rothesay, rather than remarrying Elizabeth Dunbar as previously agreed, decided to marry Mary Douglas, daughter of the Earl of Douglas. Enraged, March wrote to Henry IV on 18 February 1400, and by July had entered Henry's service. In 1401, Rothesay took on a more assertive and autonomous attitude, circumventing proper procedures, unjustifiably appropriating sums from the customs of the burghs on the east coast, before provoking further animosity when he confiscated the revenues of the temporalities of the vacant bishopric of St Andrews. Rothesay also confronted Albany's influence in central Scotland in conjunction with his uncle, Alexander Stewart, Earl of Buchan. As soon his lieutenancy expired in 1402, Rothesay was arrested and imprisoned in Albany's Falkland Castle where he died in March 1402. Rothesay's death probably lay with Albany and Douglas, who would have looked upon the possibility of the young prince acceding to the throne with great apprehension. They certainly fell under suspicion, but were cleared of all blame by a general council, "where, by divine providence and not otherwise, it is discerned that he departed from this life".

=== Albany's lieutenancy ===
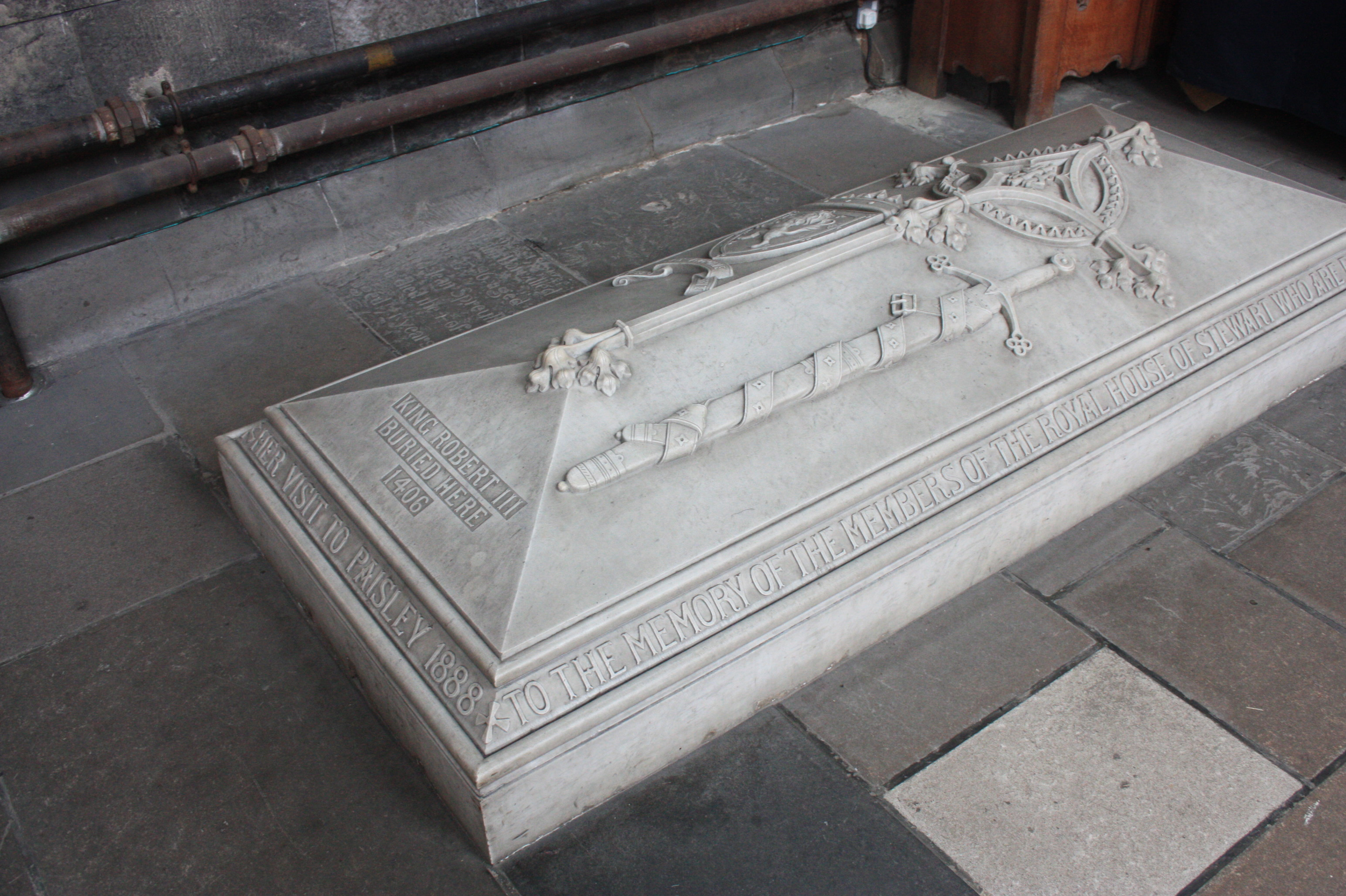
The grave of Robert III, Paisley Abbey

Following Rothesay's death, and with the restoration of the lieutenancy to Albany and the Scottish defeat at the battle of Humbleton, Robert III experienced almost total exclusion from political authority and was limited to his lands in the west. By late 1404 Robert, with the aid of his close councilors Henry Sinclair, Earl of Orkney, Sir David Fleming and Henry Wardlaw, had succeeded in re-establishing himself and intervened in favour of Alexander Stewart, the Earl of Buchan's illegitimate son, who was in dispute with Albany over the earldom of Mar. Robert III again exhibited his new resolve when in December 1404 he created a new regality in the Stewartry for his sole remaining son and heir, James, now Earl of Carrick — an act designed to prevent these lands falling into Albany's hands.

By 28 October 1405, Robert III had returned to Dundonald Castle in Ayrshire. With the king's health failing, it was decided in the winter of 1405–1406 to send the young prince to France out of the reach of Albany. Despite this, the manner of James's flight from Scotland was unplanned. In February 1406, James, together with Orkney and Fleming, at the head of a large group of followers, left the safety of Bishop Wardlaw's protection in St Andrews. He journeyed through the hostile Douglas territories of east Lothian — an act probably designed to demonstrate James's royal endorsement of his custodians, but also a move by his custodians to further their own interests in the traditional Douglas heartlands. Events went seriously wrong for James and he had to escape to the Bass Rock in the Firth of Forth along with the Earl of Orkney after his escorts were attacked by James Douglas of Balvenie, and which resulted in Sir David Fleming's death. Their confinement on the rock was to last for over a month before a ship from Danzig, en route for France, picked them up. On 22 March 1406, the ship was taken by English pirates off Flamborough Head, who delivered James to King Henry IV of England. Robert III had moved to Rothesay Castle, where, after hearing of his son's captivity, he died on 4 April 1406, and was buried in Paisley Abbey, which had been founded by the Stewarts.

== Family and issue ==
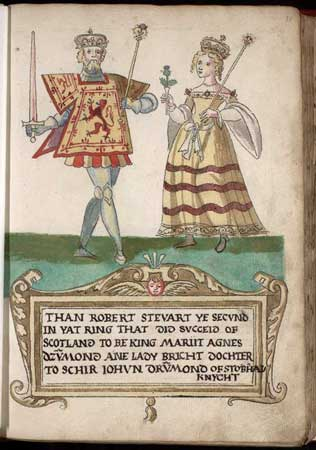
Robert III and Annabella Drummond (1562 illustration)

King Robert III married Annabella Drummond, the daughter of John Drummond of Concraig and Mary Montifex, daughter of Sir William Montifex, in c. 1366/1367. They had seven children:

- Margaret Stewart (c. 1370 - c. 1450), married Archibald Douglas, 4th Earl of Douglas, the son of Archibald Douglas, 3rd Earl of Douglas.
- Elizabeth Stewart (c. 1373 - c. 1411), married James Douglas, 1st Lord Dalkeith, son of Sir James Douglas and Agnes Dunbar.
- David Stewart, Duke of Rothesay (24 October 1378 – 26 March 1402), who was first betrothed to Elizabeth Dunbar. but later married Lady Marjory Douglas, the daughter of Archibald Douglas, 3rd Earl of Douglas.
- Mary Stewart (c. 1380 - c. 1460), married 1st George Douglas, 1st Earl of Angus; married 2nd Sir James Kennedy the Younger and gave birth to Gilbert Kennedy, 1st Lord Kennedy; betrothed to Sir William Cunningham; married 3rd to Sir William Graham of Kincardine; married 4th Sir William Edmonstone of Culloden and 1st of Duntreath (ancestors of the Edmonstone baronets).
- Robert Stewart (d. after 1393).
- Egidia Stewart (d. 1417).
- James I (July 1394 – 21 February 1437), who succeeded his father as King of Scots.

He also had at least two older illegitimate children:

- John Stewart of Ardgowan and Blackhall, (1364–1412) who was an ancestor to the Shaw-Stewart baronets;
- James Stewart of Kilbride.

== Historiography ==
Abbot Walter Bower reported that Robert III described himself as "the worst of kings and the most miserable of men". Gordon Donaldson in his general history Scottish Kings (1967) agrees and writes of the first two Stewart kings "that a famous dynasty, which was to produce so many men of remarkable ability ... made a somewhat pedestrian beginning". He immediately qualifies this statement with "it is true that the sources, both record and narrative, are scanty". He goes further and explains "admittedly, no attempt has yet been made to bring the resources of modern historical research to bear on Robert II and Robert III ... but it is beyond the bounds of probability that even if this is done either of them will emerge as a man who did much positively to shape Scottish history." When Robert III re-established his personal rule in 1393, Donaldson characterises it as a period of anarchy, and of a king who couldn't control his brothers Albany and Buchan, nor his son Rothesay.

Ranald Nicholson agrees with Donaldson in his Scotland: The Later Middle Ages (1974), and describes Robert III as a failure, like his father, because he wasn't dominant. Nicholson's opinion was that in his period as Lieutenant in the 1380s, Robert (John, Earl of Carrick) was incapable of dealing with the breakdown of law and order, citing the number of legal cases. Carrick's lameness, after being kicked by a horse, was explained by Nicholson as the excuse needed to have him replaced by his brother Robert, Earl of Fife, as the king's lieutenant. Nicholson writes, "nothing much was to be hoped for in the heir apparent", and goes on to blame Robert III for the destruction of Forres and Elgin, despite the lieutenancy of Fife at the time.

Andrew Barrell in his book Medieval Scotland (2000) puts forward that the first two Stewart kings, "had difficulty in asserting themselves, partly because their dynasty was new to kingship and needed to establish itself". Robert III's period of personal rule from 1393 was "disastrous" according to Barrell, and was exemplified by the king's failure to re-take the royal fortress of Dumbarton. Barrell's final assessment of Robert III was of a man crippled in body and incapable or averse to personally confronting Albany, but sought to do so through promoting the status of his sons, and even then, he failed.

Alexander Grant in Independence and Nationhood (1984) found Robert III to be "probably Scotland's least impressive king". Grant puts this into perspective and notes that Robert III's reign could have been worse than the turmoil and violence experienced in England and France under weak kings. Even after Robert's death, Scotland didn't descend into open civil war but was limited to positioning within the royal family and its magnate groupings. Grant, in The New Cambridge Medieval History, explains that the 13th-century Scottish kings ruled with the endorsement of practically all the political classes, but that none of the 14th-century kings, from Robert I to Robert III, did so and retained loyalty by the use of patronage. The benefits of this were outweighed by the disadvantages — alienated lands reduced the crown's income. Endowments had the same effect; the estates granted to nobles and the church, often in regality, led to a loss of royal attendance within these territories and contributed to a diminishment of authority.

Michael Lynch suggests that the earlier 20th-century historians made hasty evaluations of both Robert II and Robert III when they characterised them as "pathetically weak personalities" and their reigns as "nineteen years of senility and sixteen of infirmity". Lynch also makes the point that the complaints made in the later chronicles of lawlessness and disturbance in the country were mainly confined to the north, with the king's brother Alexander, Lord of Badenoch and Earl of Buchan, at its root. The death of John, Lord of the Isles, heralded a state of dissension between the lordship and the crown that was to last for two generations and which even Robert III's successor, James I, was unable to deal with properly. Lynch states that much of the troubles during Robert III's reign derived from the sharp deterioration of the royal revenues. The unruliness of northern Scotland was the result of competing factions within the royal family — Lynch suggests that the weakness in kingship before 1406 "can be exaggerated", citing Buchan's enforced appearance at Robert III's council to answer for his incendiary attack on Elgin and its cathedral, and Albany's obtainment of a submission from the lord of the Isles.

In Stephen Boardman's The Early Stewart Kings, the younger Robert, then John, Earl of Carrick, is shown to be an energetic, ambitious man and fully engaged in the running of the country, at the centre of Anglo-Scottish diplomacy, and who became the pre-eminent magnate in Scotland and whose political importance south of the Forth would eclipse that of his father's. Boardman describes how in 1384 he callously engineered the council to remove his father from power and to place it in his hands. Many of the problems of Robert III's rule, Boardman argues, stemmed from the death of his brother-in-law and close ally James, Earl of Douglas, at Otterburn in 1388, when his deliberately constructed and powerful affinity south of the Forth crumbled. That same year, Carrick lost the lieutenancy to his brother Robert, Earl of Fife, which, Boardman suggests, was a blow to the future king's standing and one from which he would not fully recover. According to Boardman, when Robert became king in 1390, he was the victim of his father's style of government, characterised by Robert II's creation of his sons, sons-in-law, and other major territorial nobles as powerful magnates to whom he delegated extensive authority. As a result, Robert III's brothers refused to act simply as liegemen to the king. Robert III, already weakened by the council when he ascended the throne, was in the end completely subordinated to the magnate power of Albany and Douglas.

== Fictional portrayals ==
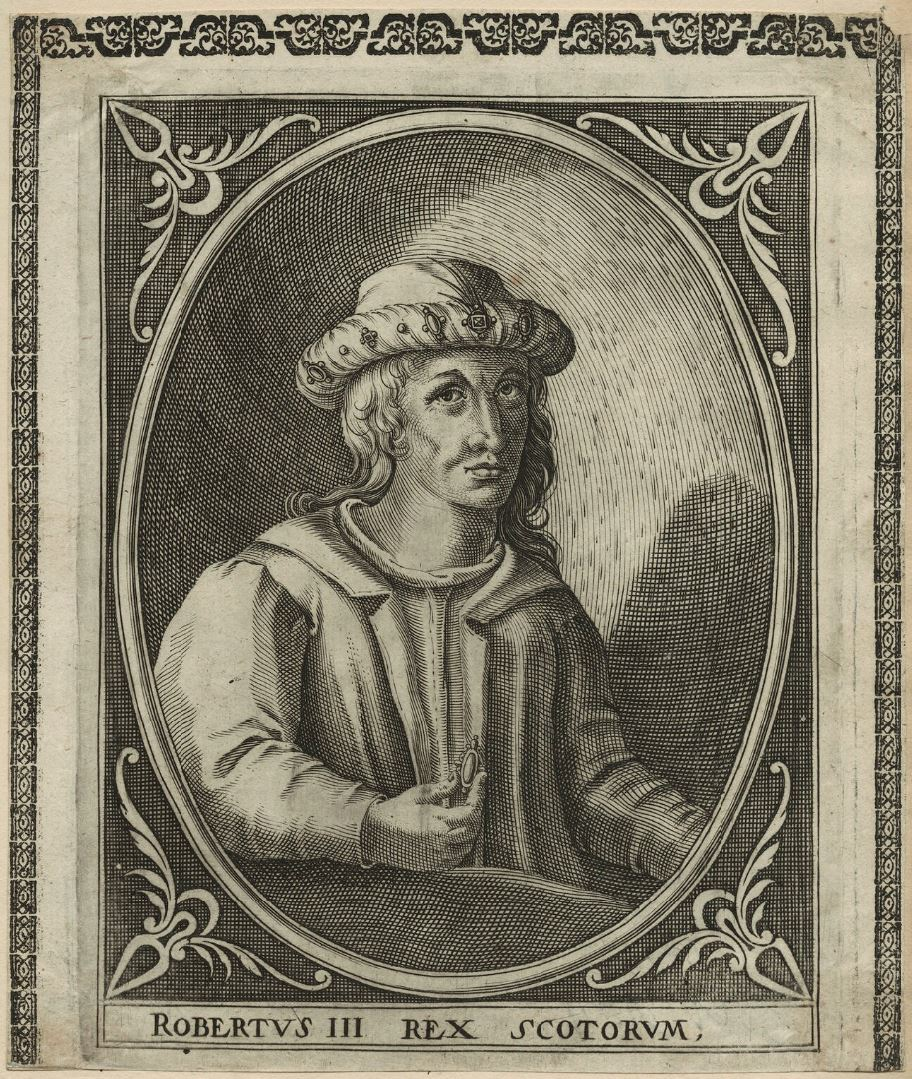
An early 17th century imagining of Robert.

Robert III has been depicted in historical novels. They include:

- The Fair Maid of Perth (1828) by Walter Scott. The novel covers events from 1396 to 1402, depicting "Scottish Clan feuds" and other disturbances in Robert III's reign. Robert III himself, David Stewart, Duke of Rothesay, and Robert Stewart, Duke of Albany are prominently depicted. Archibald the Grim, Earl of Douglas stands out among the secondary characters;
- The Lords of Misrule (1976) by Nigel Tranter. Covers events from c. 1388 to 1390. Depicting the last years of Robert II of Scotland and the rise of Robert III to the throne. As the elderly king has grown "feeble, weary and half-blind", his sons, daughters and other nobles campaign for power. An ungoverned Scotland is ravaged by their conflicts. Robert Stewart, Duke of Albany and Alexander Stewart, Earl of Buchan are prominently featured;
- A Folly of Princes (1977) by Nigel Tranter. Covers events from c. 1390 to 1402. Robert III turns out to be a weak king. His son David Stewart, Duke of Rothesay, and brother Robert Stewart, Duke of Albany rival each other for political power in his court. But the struggle attracts the attention of Richard II and Henry IV, leading to English involvement;
- The Captive Crown (1977) by Nigel Tranter. Covers events from 1402 to 1411. It depicts the last few years in the reign of Robert III, the captivity of James I of Scotland at the hands of Henry IV and the events back in Scotland. Concluding with the Battle of Harlaw.

== Family tree ==
Some of the most powerful Scots of Robert III's time were his close relatives:

Robert I, King of Scotland
Marjorie Bruce	David II, King of Scotland
Robert II, King of Scotland
Robert III, King of Scotland	Robert Stewart, Duke of Albany	Alexander Stewart, Earl of Buchan
David Stewart, Duke of Rothesay	James I, King of Scotland	Murdoch Stewart	Alexander Stewart, Earl of Mar

== See also ==
- Scottish monarchs' family tree

== Sources ==
- Barrell, Andrew D. M. (2000), Medieval Scotland, Cambridge University Press, ISBN 0-521-58602-X
- Boardman, S. I. (September 2004). "Annabella". Oxford Dictionary of National Biography. Oxford Dictionary of National Biography (online ed.). Oxford University Press. doi:10.1093/ref:odnb/8063. (Subscription, Wikipedia Library access or UK public library membership required.)
- Boardman, Stephen (2007), The Early Stewart Kings: Robert II and Robert III, 1371–1406, The Stewart Dynasty in Scotland Series, Edinburgh: John Donald, an imprint of Birlinn Ltd, ISBN 978-1-904607-68-7
- Boardman, S. I. (May 2006). "Robert II". Oxford Dictionary of National Biography. Oxford Dictionary of National Biography (online ed.). Oxford University Press. doi:10.1093/ref:odnb/23713. (Subscription, Wikipedia Library access or UK public library membership required.)
- Boardman, S. I. (2004). "Robert III". Oxford Dictionary of National Biography. Oxford Dictionary of National Biography (ODNB) (online ed.). Oxford University Press. doi:10.1093/ref:odnb/23714. (Subscription, Wikipedia Library access or UK public library membership required.)
- Boardman, Stephen (2007), "The Gaelic World and the Early Stewart Court", in Broun, Dauvit; MacGregor, Martin (eds.), Mìorun Mòr nan Gall, "The Great Ill-Will of the Lowlander"? Lowland Perceptions of the Highlands, Medieval and Modern (1st ed.), The Centre for Scottish and Celtic Studies, University of Glasgow, OCLC 540108870
- Brewer, Ebenezer Cobham (1892), Character Sketches of Romance, Fiction and the Drama, vol. 3 (2004 ed.), The Minerva Group, Inc., ISBN 978-1-4102-1335-8
- Brown, Keith M.; Tanner, Roland (2008), The History of the Scottish Parliament: Parliament and Politics In Scotland 1235–1560, vol. 1, Edinburgh University Press, ISBN 978-0-7486-1485-1
- Brown, Michael (2004), The Wars of Scotland, 1214–1371, Edinburgh University Press, ISBN 0-7486-1238-6
- Brown, M. H. (2004). "James I". Oxford Dictionary of National Biography. Oxford Dictionary of National Biography (online ed.). Oxford University Press. doi:10.1093/ref:odnb/14587. (Subscription, Wikipedia Library access or UK public library membership required.)
- Burns, Charles, ed. (1976), Calendar of Papal Letters to Scotland of Clement VII of Avignon, 1378–1394, Scottish History Society, ISBN 978-0-9500260-8-4
- Dunbar, Archibald H. (1899), Scottish Kings: A Revised Chronology of Scottish History, Edinburgh: David Douglas
- Duncan, A. A. M. (2004). "Murray, Sir Andrew, of Bothwell (1298–1338)". Oxford Dictionary of National Biography. Oxford Dictionary of National Biography (online ed.). Oxford University Press. doi:10.1093/ref:odnb/19590. (Subscription, Wikipedia Library access or UK public library membership required.)
- Grant, Alexander (1992), "The Otterburn War from the Scottish Point of View", in Goodman, Anthony; Tuck, Anthony (eds.), War and Border Societies in the Middle Ages, Routledge, ISBN 0-415-08021-5
- Grant, Alexander (1984), Independence and Nationhood, Edward Arnold (Publishers) Ltd, ISBN 0-7131-6309-7
- Grant, Alexander (2000), "Fourteenth-century Scotland", in Jones, Michael; et al. (eds.), The New Cambridge Medieval History: C. 1300-1415, Woodbridge: Cambridge University Press, ISBN 0-521-36290-3
- Innes, Cosmo (1837), Registrum Episcapus Moraviensis, Edinburgh: Ballantyne Club
- Paul, James Balfour, ed. (1904), The Scots Peerage, vol. I, Edinburgh: David Douglas
- Grant, Alexander (2008), "Franchises North of the Border", in Prestwich, Michael (ed.), Liberties and Identities in the Medieval British Isles, Woodbridge: The Boydell Press, ISBN 978-1-84383-374-1
- Nield, Jonathan (1968), A Guide to the Best Historical Novels and Tales, Ayer Publishing, ISBN 978-0-8337-2509-7
- Penman, Michael (2001), "The House Divided: Bruce vs Balliol, 1290–1371", in Oram, Richard (ed.), The Kings & Queens of Scotland, Stroud, Gloucestershire: Tempus Publishing Ltd, ISBN 0-7524-1991-9
- Rogers, Clifford J. (1999), The Wars of Edward III: Sources and Interpretations, Boydell & Brewer, ISBN 0-85115-646-0
- Sadler, John (2006), Border Fury: England and Scotland at War 1296–1568, Longman, ISBN 1-4058-4022-6
- University of St Andrews, Records of the Parliaments of Scotland to 1707
- Webster, Bruce (2004). "David II". Oxford Dictionary of National Biography. Oxford Dictionary of National Biography (online ed.). Oxford University Press. doi:10.1093/ref:odnb/3726. (Subscription, Wikipedia Library access or UK public library membership required.)
- Webster, Bruce (2004). "Balliol, Edward (b. in or after 1281, d. 1364)". Oxford Dictionary of National Biography. Oxford Dictionary of National Biography (online ed.). Oxford University Press. doi:10.1093/ref:odnb/1206. (Subscription, Wikipedia Library access or UK public library membership required.)
- Webster, Bruce (1998), "Scotland without a King, 1329–1341", in Grant, Alexander; Stringer, Keith (eds.), Medieval Scotland: Crown, Lordship and Community, Edinburgh: Edinburgh University Press, ISBN 0-7486-1110-X
- Weir, Alison (2008), Britain's Royal Family: A Complete Genealogy, London: Vintage Books, ISBN 9780099539735

Robert III of Scotland House of Stewart Born: c. 1337 Died: 4 April 1406
Regnal titles
Preceded by Robert II	King of Scots; 19 April 1390 – 4 April 1406	Succeeded by James I
Peerage of Scotland
Preceded by Robert Stewart	Earl of Atholl; 1367–1390	Vacant Title next held by David Stewart
New title	Earl of Carrick; 1368 – 5 March 1390	Succeeded by David Stewart
Court offices
Preceded by Robert Stewart	High Steward of Scotland c. 1371–1390	Reverted to crown
New title	Guardian of Scotland; November 1384 – December 1388	Succeeded by Robert Stewart
