= Elizabeth Mure =

Wife of Robert, High Steward of Scotland (1320–1355)

- Born: 2 March 1320; Rowallan Castle
- Died: before May 1355 (aged 35)
- Spouse: Robert II of Scotland (m. 1336)
- Issue: Robert III, King of Scots; Walter, Lord of Fife; Robert, Duke of Albany; Alexander, Earl of Buchan
- Father: Sir Adam Mure of Rowallan
- Mother: Janet Mure of Pokelly

Elizabeth Mure (est. born 2 March 1320 - died before May 1355), a member of Clan Muir, was the first wife of Robert, High Steward of Scotland, and Guardian of Scotland (1338–1341 and from October 1346), who later became King Robert II of Scotland.

Because their marriage was originally not sanctioned in a church, but what today would be called a common-law marriage, Elizabeth is often identified as his mistress.

== Life ==
Elizabeth Mure was said to be born at Rowallan Castle. Her parents were Sir Adam Mure of Rowallan, Ayrshire, and Janet Mure of Pokelly, Ayr, South Ayrshire. Through her father, Elizabeth Mure may be a descendant of Fergus of Galloway (est. 1078 - 1161) and his wife Elizabeth FitzRoy (est. 1109 - 1160), the illegitimate daughter of King Henry I of England, and a member of the House of Normandy. The Muirs/Mures also claim descent from King Fergus Mór of Dál Riata, per the history of Clan Muir.

Elizabeth is believed to have entered into a 'secular marriage' with Robert Stewart, then High Steward of Scotland, around 1336. They had multiple children. The marriage was criticized as uncanonical, so they remarried in 1349, following a papal dispensation dated at Avignon 22 November 1347. They had at least ten children, with some accounts saying as many as thirteen. Doubts about the validity of their marriage led to disputes over their children's right to the crown.

When Robert Stewart inherited the crown at the age of 55 in 1371, becoming Robert II of Scotland, Elizabeth had already died. Robert II later remarried (Papal Dispensation dated 2 May 1355). On 27 March 1371, "The Lord John (who later took the title of King Robert III, changing his name because of what he saw as John de Baliol's unpatriotic desecration of the name John), Earl of Carrick and Steward of Scotland, first-born son of King Robert II" was declared heir to the Crown by Parliament in Scone Abbey.

== Issue ==
- Robert III (c. 1337 – 4 April 1406), born John Stewart, Earl of Carrick
- Walter Stewart, Lord of Fife (c.1338–1362)
- Robert Stewart, Duke of Albany (c. 1340–1420)
- Alexander Stewart, Earl of Buchan (1343 – c. 20 July 1405)
- Margaret Stewart, married John of Islay, Lord of the Isles
- Marjorie Stewart, married firstly, John Dunbar, Earl of Moray, and secondly, Sir Alexander Keith
- Johanna (Jean) Stewart, married firstly, Sir John Keith, secondly, Sir John Lyon, and thirdly in 1384, Sir James Sandilands.
- Isabella Stewart, married firstly, James Douglas, 2nd Earl of Douglas, and secondly, John Edmonstone of that Ilk
- Katherine Stewart, married Sir Robert Logan of Grugar and Restalrig, Lord High Admiral of Scotland
- Elizabeth Stewart, married Sir Thomas Hay, Lord High Constable of Scotland

== See also ==
Polnoon Castle - Elizabeth Mure was the great-great-granddaughter of John Montgomerie
