= Mary de Monthermer =

English noblewoman (1297–c. 1371)

- Countess of Fife
- Born: October 1297
- Died: 1371
- Spouse: Duncan IV, Earl of Fife
- Issue: Isabella, Countess of Fife
- Father: Ralph de Monthermer, 1st Baron Monthermer
- Mother: Joan of Acre

Mary MacDuff, Countess of Fife (née de Monthermer; October 1297 – c. 1371) was an English noblewoman. She was a daughter of Ralph de Monthermer, 1st Baron Monthermer and his wife Princess Joan, thereby making her the grandchild of King Edward I of England. Other sources have her being born in 1298.

== Family and early life ==
Mary's mother Joan was a daughter of Edward I of England. In early 1297, her mother faced the intense disapproval of King Edward when she decided to secretly marry Ralph de Monthermer, a squire in her household. For her second marriage, the King had hoped to marry Joan to Amadeus V, Count of Savoy. Ralph was subsequently imprisoned at Bristol Castle for a brief time. Joan is said to have told her father that if it was no disgrace for an earl to marry a poor woman, it should not be blameworthy for a countess to advance a capable young man. Monthermer was released and their Clare estates restored. Monthermer was made Earl of Gloucester and Hertford during his wife's lifetime.

He and Joan had two sons and two daughters before her death on 23 April 1307. Mary de Monthermer was the eldest of them. Mary and her full-siblings most likely lived in her mother's quarters in Windsor Castle and Marlborough Castle until her marriage. Mary also had four half-siblings from her mother's first marriage to Gilbert de Clare, 6th Earl of Hertford. They were Gilbert de Clare, 7th Earl of Hertford, Eleanor de Clare, (wife of Hugh le Despenser the Younger), Margaret de Clare, and Elizabeth de Clare.

Upon Joan's death, Ralph ceased to be referred to as Earl of Gloucester, passing the title onto Joan's only son from her first marriage. In 1318, Mary's father married the widowed Isabel le Despenser, daughter of Hugh le Despenser, Earl of Winchester.

== Marriage and issue ==
In 1307, her grandfather Edward I and her uncle Edward II arranged for her to wed Donnchadh IV, Earl of Fife (1289–1353). A papal dispensation was granted on 4 November 1307. A posthumous child, Duncan had spent his minority in England. As was common for the time, she was very young – only nine years old. They had one surviving daughter, who was born fourteen years after they married. She would come to inherit Duncan's lands:

- Isabella, Countess of Fife (sometimes called Elizabeth) (1320–1389); married four times.

Near 6 November 1314, Duncan was able to free himself from English control and leave for Scotland. Mary would not join him until January 1320. In 1332, Mary and her daughter were captured at Perth by supporters of King David II of Scotland. Isabella was sent as a ward to Northumberland, where she married her guardian Sir William Felton. Felton was styled "Lord of Fife" in right of his wife, as Isabella had no brothers.

In 1346, Mary's husband was tried for treason and sentenced to a traitor's death by Edward III of England. He was able to obtain mercy however and was permitted to return to Scotland to raise money for his ransom, which he did in 1350. Duncan died three years later. Mary would die at least eighteen years later (sometime after 1371); their daughter succeeded as Countess of Fife, but resigned the earldom to Robert Stewart, Duke of Albany the same year her mother died.

== Ancestry ==
Ancestors of Mary de Monthermer

2. Ralph de Monthermer, 1st Baron Monthermer
1. Mary de Monthermer
24. John of England
12. Henry III of England
25. Isabella of Angoulême
6. Edward I of England
26. Ramon Berenguer IV, Count of Provence
13. Eleanor of Provence
27. Beatrice of Savoy
3. Joan of Acre
28. Alfonso IX of León
14. Ferdinand III of Castile
29. Berengaria of Castile
7. Eleanor of Castile
30. Simon of Dammartin
15. Joan, Countess of Ponthieu
31. Marie, Countess of Ponthieu
