= Donnchadh IV, Earl of Fife =

Earl of Fife from 1289 to 1353

Donnchadh IV
- Arms of Duncan, Earl of Fife

Earl of Fife
- In office 1288–1353

Donnchadh IV, Earl of Fife [Duncan IV] (1289–1353) was a Scottish nobleman who was Guardian of Scotland and the last native Scottish Mormaer of Fife from 1289 until his death.

He was born in late 1289, the same year as his father Donnchadh III's murder. He therefore inherited the Mormaerdom as a baby. He was so young that the honour of crowning John Balliol – normally the hereditary right of the Mormaer of Fife – was delegated to a knight, namely John de St. John. He also missed the crowning of Robert the Bruce, owing to his captivity in England. Robert was forced to call upon Donnchadh's sister, Isabella, to officiate in his absence.

Donnchadh's initial support for Robert has been doubted, but in 1315, a year after the Battle of Bannockburn, he resigned his Mormaerdom to King Robert for a regrant. The agreement with Robert ensured that the Mormaerdom of Fife would not be held by the king, and that the arms of Fife should always be unique from the similar royal arms. If Donnchadh were to die childless, King Robert would grant it to someone, by default Alan of Menteith. This was because Donnchadh's wife was in the custody of the English, and there was obviously some pressure from the men of Fife to retain their own regional ruler. He was present at the negotiations which led to the Treaty of Edinburgh-Northampton, and was a signatory to the Declaration of Arbroath.

The Earl of Fife fought with the Bruce loyalists at the Battle of Dupplin Moor where, he being made prisoner, changed sides and, with William Sinclair, Bishop of Dunkeld, a great adherent of Robert the Bruce, crowned Edward Balliol King of Scots at Scone on 24 September 1332. The following year, on 19 July 1333, he fought with the Scottish army at the Battle of Halidon Hill, where he was again captured.

In 1306, Donnchadh married Mary de Monthermer, a granddaughter of Edward I of England. He died in 1353 without any male heirs. He is important because he was the last male Gaelic ruler of Fife. He was succeeded in his mormaerdom by his daughter Isabella, who married four times:

- William Ramsay of Colluthie. He succeeded as Earl of Fife, de iure uxoris. William and Isabella had a daughter named Elizabeth Ramsey. Alternatively she may have been married to William Felton.
- Walter Stewart, son of Robert II of Scotland and Euphemia de Ross. He succeeded as Earl of Fife, de iure uxoris.
- Thomas Biset of Upsetlington, who succeeded as Earl of Fife, de iure uxoris.
- John Dunbar, possibly a son of Patrick V, Earl of March and his first wife Ermengarde. John Dunbar succeeded as Earl of Fife, de iure uxoris.

Isabella ceded the Earldom of Fife to Robert Stewart, 1st Duke of Albany in 1371.

== Bibliography ==
- Bannerman, John, "MacDuff of Fife," in A. Grant & K.Stringer (eds.) Medieval Scotland: Crown, Lordship and Community, Essays Presented to G.W.S. Barrow, (Edinburgh, 1993), pp. 20–38
- Barrow, G. W. S., Robert Bruce and the Community of the Realm of Scotland, (Edinburgh, 1988)
- Broun, Dauvit, "Anglo-French Acculturation and the Irish Element in Scottish Identity", in Brendan Smith (ed.), Britain and Ireland, 9001-300: Insular Responses to Medieval European Change, (Cambridge, 1999), pp. 135–53
- McDonald, Andrew, "Macduff family, earls of Fife (per. c.1095–1371)", Oxford Dictionary of National Biography, Oxford University Press, 2004 accessed 8 Sept 2007

Preceded by Donnchadh III	Mormaer of Fife; 1288–1353	Succeeded by Isabella
