= Earl of Fife =

Extinct earldom in the Peerage of the United Kingdom

Earldom of Fife
- Creation date: 11th century?
- Peerage: Peerage of Scotland
- First holder: Ethelred
- Last holder: Murdoch
- Extinction date: 1425
- Seat: Macduff's Castle

The Earl of Fife or Mormaer of Fife was the ruler of the province of Fife in medieval Scotland, which encompassed the modern counties of Fife and Kinross. Due to their royal ancestry, the earls of Fife were the highest ranking nobles in the realm, and had the right to crown the king of Scots.

Held by the MacDuff family until it passed by resignation to the Stewarts, the earldom ended on the forfeiture and execution of Murdoch Stewart in 1425. The earldom was revived in 1759 with the style of Earl Fife for William Duff, a descendant of the MacDuffs. His great-great-grandson, the 6th Earl Fife, was made Earl of Fife in 1885 and Duke of Fife in 1889.

== Medieval earldom ==
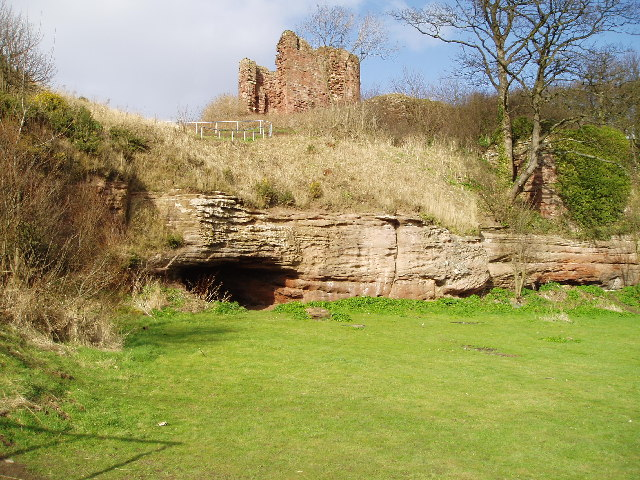
Macduff's Castle, seat of the Earls of Fife

=== Mormaer of Fife ===
The mormaers of Fife, by the 12th century, had established themselves as the highest ranking native nobles in Scotland. The earliest certain mormaer of Fife was Causantín or Constantine (fl. 1095–1128). The mormaers frequently held the office of Justiciar of Scotia – highest brithem in the land - and enjoyed the right of crowning the kings of the Scots. The Mormaer's function, as with other medieval Scottish lordships, was partly kin-based. Hence, in 1385, the earl of Fife, seen as the successor of the same lordship, is called capitalis legis de Clenmcduffe ('Lord of the Law of the Children of Macduff'), and was often but not always also the chief of Clan MacDuff.

The first earl, proper, was Alexander Scrymgeour (died 1306). Alexander served under William Wallace and Robert the Bruce. He was the official and hereditary banner bearer for the king and was awarded title of earl and the demesne of Fife for services rendered. The lordship existed in the Middle Ages until its last earl, Murdoch (Muireadhach), Duke of Albany, was executed by James I of Scotland.

=== Chief of Clan Macduff ===
The deputy or complementary position to mormaer or earl of Fife was leadership as Chief (ceann) of Clan MacDuff (clann meic Duibh). There is little doubt that the style MacDuib, or Macduff, derives from the name of King Cináed III mac Duib, and ultimately from this man's father, King Dub (d. 966). Compare, for instance, that Domhnall, Lord of the Isles, signed a charter in 1408 as MacDomhnaill. The descendants of Cináed III adopted the name in the same way that the descendants of Brian Bóruma mac Cennétig called themselves Uí Briain, although it does seem that at least initially MacDuff was a style reserved for the man who held the Mormaership of Fife.

The chieftaincy of the clan was not always held by the mormaer, especially after the mormaerdom became subject to the laws of feudal primogeniture in the reign of Donnchadh I. For example, at the Battle of Falkirk, it is the head of the clan who led the men of Fife, rather than the Mormaer.

=== End of Macduff line ===
The Macduff line continued without interruption until the time of Isabella, the only child of Donnchad (Duncan) IV, Earl of Fife, and his wife Mary de Monthermer. She succeeded her father as suo jure Countess of Fife on his death in 1358, making her one of the most eligible maidens in Scotland. She married four times, but all her husbands died within a few years of their marriage. In 1371 she was persuaded to name Robert Stewart, Earl of Menteith (later Duke of Albany) as her heir, who was her brother-in-law by her second marriage to Walter Stewart. He thus succeeded her as twelfth Earl of Fife on her death in 1389. Duke Robert was succeeded as Duke of Albany, Earl of Fife, etc. by his son Murdoch in 1420. Duke Murdoch was forfeited and executed in 1425, due to his father's part in the death of Prince David, Duke of Rothesay. Thus the earldom of Fife came to an end.

== Coat of arms ==
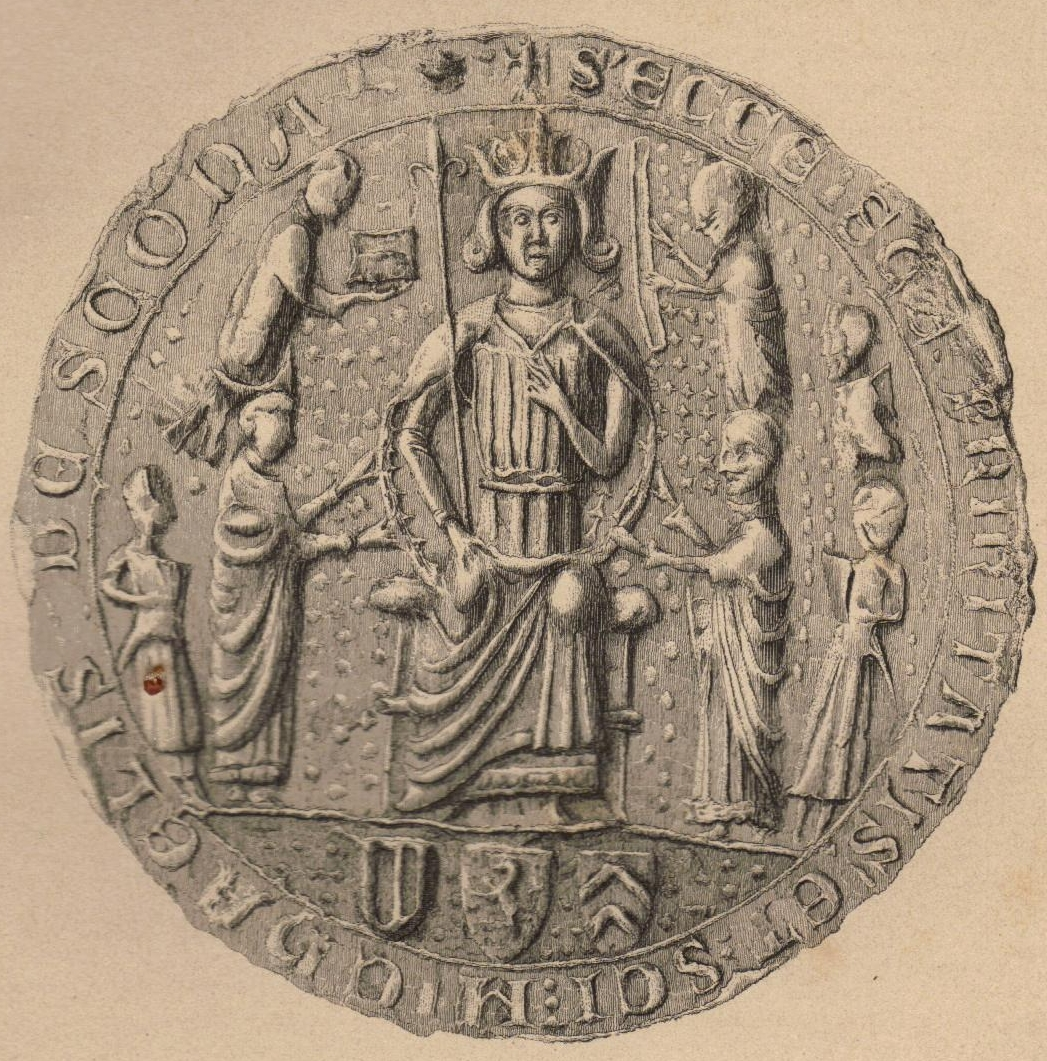
Seal of Scone Abbey, made c. 1250. The Earl of Fife's shield is shown at the bottom-left, displaying the early striped version

The arms of the earldom of Fife are "or, a lion rampant gules," that is, a red lion rampant on gold. These arms are testament to the earls' royal connection, as they differ from the king's arms only in the exclusion of the flowered border, or royal tressure; in fact it is possible that the royal arms are actually a differenced version of those of the earl. The device of a lion is attested for the first time on the seal of the tenth earl, but had probably been used for a long time before this, though some early seals show a different shield, bearing pallets, or vertical stripes.

The arms of the earl of Fife are the basis for the arms of Fife Council, which show a knight on horseback in full armorial regalia, his shield, helm and the caparison of his horse bedecked with red lions. The Fife lion also appears in the first quarter of the duke of Fife's arms.

== Earls Fife (1759) ==
The earldom of Fife was resurrected in 1759 for William Duff, after he proved his descent from the original earls of Fife. This title was in the Peerage of Ireland, notwithstanding that Fife is in Scotland; the "of" was also excluded, as was "not unfrequently" the case in the Irish Peerage.

== Earls of Fife (1885) ==
Arms of Alexander Duff, 6th Earl Fife (1849–1912), created Earl of Fife in 1885 and Duke of Fife in 1889

The title of Earl of Fife in the peerage of the United Kingdom was created in 1885 by Queen Victoria for Alexander Duff, 6th Earl Fife (1849–1912).

In 1889, Duff married Queen Victoria's granddaughter Princess Louise. Queen Victoria elevated him to the dignity of Duke of Fife in the peerage of the United Kingdom. In 1900, Queen Victoria created a second dukedom of Fife for him which could pass to his daughters and their heirs male. After his death in 1912, the dukedom of Fife created in 1900 passed to his eldest daughter, Princess Alexandra, while his other titles, including the 1885 earldom of Fife and the 1889 dukedom of Fife, became extinct.

== List of holders ==
=== Mormaers of Fife ===
- ? Giric mac Cináeda meic Duib
- ?
- Macduib (= Shakespeare's MacDuff) (fl. 1057–1058)
- Causantín, Mormaer of Fife, (fl. 1095–1128)
  - See Mormaer Beth and Ethelred of Scotland for common confusion here
- Gille Míchéil, Mormaer of Fife (1130–1133)
- Donnchadh I, Earl of Fife (1133–1154)
- Donnchadh II, Earl of Fife (1154–1204)
- Maol Choluim I, Earl of Fife (1204–1228)
- Maol Choluim II, Earl of Fife (1228–1266)
- Colbán, Earl of Fife, (1266–1270/1272)
- Donnchadh III, Earl of Fife (1270/1272–1288)
- Donnchadh IV, Earl of Fife (1288–1353), considered by King David II to have forfeited the earldom
- William Ramsay of Colluthie, Earl of Fife (1358–c. 1360), created by King David II
- Isabella, Countess of Fife, (1361–1371), daughter of Donnchadh IV, was persuaded to resign the earldom to
- Robert Stewart, Earl of Fife (1371–1420)
- Murdoch Stewart, Duke of Albany, Earl of Fife (1420–1425)

=== Earls Fife ===
- William Duff, 1st Earl Fife (c. 1696–1763)
- James Duff, 2nd Earl Fife (1729–1809)
- Alexander Duff, 3rd Earl Fife (1731–1811)
- James Duff, 4th Earl Fife (1776–1857)
- James Duff, 5th Earl Fife (1814–1879)

=== Dukes of Fife ===
- Alexander Duff, 6th Earl Fife, 1st Earl of Fife, 1st Duke of Fife (1849–1912)
- Princess Alexandra, 2nd Duchess of Fife (1891–1959)
- James Carnegie, 3rd Duke of Fife (1929–2015)
- David Carnegie, 4th Duke of Fife (b. 1961)

== Family tree ==
Family tree: Earls of Fife, Dukes of Fife, Earls of Southesk and Earls of Northesk

(Mormaers) Earls of Fife (Scot)
Donnchad (Duncan) I 1113–1154; Earl of Fife
Donnchad (Duncan/Dunecan) II d. 1204; Earl of Fife
Máel Coluim (Maol Choluim, Malcolm) I 1204–1228; Earl of Fife	Donnchadh
Máel Coluim (Malcolm) II c. Early 13th century–1266 Earl of Fife
Colban c. 1247–1253–1270/1272; Earl of Fife
Donnchadh (Duncan) III; 1270/1272–1288; Earl of Fife
Robert II of Scotland; 1316–1390; King of Scotland	Donnchadh (Duncan) IV; 1289–1353; Earl of Fife
Robert III of Scotland c. 1337–1406; King of Scotland	m1. Walter Stewart c. 1338–1362; Earl of Fife jure uxoris	Isabella MacDuff c. 1320–1389; Countess of Fife suo jure	Robert Stewart c. 1340–1420; Duke of Albany, Earl of Fife, Earl of Menteith, Earl of Buchan, Earl of Atholl	m2. Thomas Bisset d. 1366; Earl of Fife jure uxoris	m3. John Dunbar d. before 1371; Earl of Fife jure uxoris
Murdoch Stewart; 1362–1425; Earl of Fife; Duke of Albany
David Carnegie of Colluthie; 1559–1598
Earl of Southesk, 1633
David Carnegie; 1575–1658; 1st Earl of Southesk
Earl of Northesk, 1662
John Carnegie; 1611–1667; 1st Earl of Northesk
James Carnegie before 1583–1669; 2nd Earl of Southesk	Alexander Carnegie d. 1681/82	David Carnegie d. 1669; 2nd Earl of Northesk
Robert Carnegie before 1649–1688; 3rd Earl of Southesk	David Carnegie d. 1708; 1st Baronet	David Carnegie; 1643–1688; 3rd Earl of Northesk	Patrick Carnegie of Lour after 1643–1743
Charles Carnegie; 1661–1699; 4th Earl of Southesk	James Carnegie; 1673–1729; 2nd Baronet	David Carnegie; 1675–1729; 4th Earl of Northesk	Patrick Carnegie of Lour; 1684–1729
Viscount Macduff and Baron Braco, 1735; Earl Fife, 1759
William Duff; 1697–1763; 1st Earl Fife, etc.	James Carnegie; 1692–1730; 5th Earl of Southesk	James Carnegie; 1716–1765 de jure 6th Earl of Southesk	David Carnegie; 1701–1741; 5th Earl of Northesk	George Carnegie; 1716–1792; 6th Earl of Northesk	Patrick Carnegie of Lour; 1720–1799
Earldom of Southesk attainted, 1716
Baron Fife (GB), 1790
James Duff; 1729–1809; 2nd Earl Fife, etc., Baron Fife (GB)	Alexander Duff; 1731–1811; 3rd Earl Fife, etc.	David Carnegie; 1753–1805 de jure 7th Earl of Southesk	William Carnegie; 1756–1831; 7th Earl of Northesk	Patrick Carnegie of Lour; 1757–1819
Baron Fife (GB) extinct, 1809
Baron Fife (UK), 1827
James Duff; 1776–1857; 4th Earl Fife, etc., Baron Fife (UK)	Alexander Duff; 1777–1851	James Carnegie; 1799–1849 de jure 8th Earl of Southesk	William Hopetoun Carnegie; 1794–1878; 8th Earl of Northesk	Alexander Carnegie; 1793–1862
Baron Fife (UK) extinct, 1809
Baron Skene, 1857	Southesk attainder reversed, 1855
Queen Victoria; 1819–1901	James Duff; 1814–1879; 5th Earl Fife, etc., 1st Baron Skene	James Carnegie; 1827–1905; 9th Earl of Southesk	Alexander Carnegie; 1829–1900
King Edward VII; 1841–1910	Prince Arthur; 1850–1942; Duke of Connaught and Strathearn	George John Carnegie; 1843–1891; 9th Earl of Northesk
Earl of Fife, 1885; Duke of Fife (Scotland), 1889; Duke of Fife (UK), Marquess of Macduff, and Earl of Macduff, 1900
King George V 1865–1936	Louise, Princess Royal; 1867–1931; Duchess of Fife	Alexander William George Duff; 1849–1912; 1st Duke of Fife (Scot) and Earl of Fife, 1st Duke of Fife (UK) and Earl of Macduff, Marquess of Macduff; 6th Earl Fife, etc., 2nd Baron Skene	Charles Noel Carnegie; 1854–1941; 10th Earl of Southesk	David John Carnegie; 1865–1921; 10th Earl of Northesk	Douglas George Carnegie; 1870–1937	Charles Carnegie; 1864–1928
Dukedom of Fife (Scot), Marquess of Macduff, Earldom Fife (1759), Viscountcy of Macduff, and Baronies of Braco and Skene extinct, 1912
Prince Arthur of Connaught; 1883–1938	Princess Alexandra; 1891–1959; 2nd Duchess of Fife (UK), etc. suo jure	Maud Carnegie; 1893–1945; Countess of Southesk	Charles Alexander Bannerman Carnegie; 1893–1992; 11th Earl of Southesk	David Ludovic George Hopetoun Carnegie; 1901–1963; 11th Earl of Northesk	John Douglas Carnegie; 1895–1975; 12th Earl of Northesk	Patrick Carnegy; 1893–1969
Prince Alastair Arthur (later Alistair Windsor); 1914–1943; Duke of Connaught and Strathearn	James George Alexander Bannerman Carnegie; 1929–2015; 3rd Duke of Fife, etc., 12th Earl of Southesk	Robert Andrew Carnegie; 1926–1994; 13th Earl of Northesk	Patrick Charles Carnegy b. 1940; 15th Earl of Northesk	Colin Carnegy b. 1942
Heir presumptive to the Earldom of Northesk
David Charles Carnegie b. 1961; 4th Duke of Fife, etc., 13th Earl of Southesk	David John MacRae Carnegie; 1954–2010; 14th Earl of Northesk
Charles Carnegie b. 1989 styled Earl of Southesk	George Carnegie b. 1991	Hugh Carnegie b. 1993
Heir apparent
