= Colban, Earl of Fife =

Scottish noble

Arms possibly borne by Earl Colban, as shown (without colour) on his seal

Colban, Earl of Fife (b. c. 1247–1253, d. 1270/2) was ruler of Fife in Scotland. The son of Earl Malcolm and his wife, one of the daughters of Llywelyn the Great (probably Susanna fl. 1228), he succeeded his father while still a teenager on Malcolm's death in 1266. He had been knighted by King Alexander III in 1264.

His wife's name was Anna, and she was likely one of the three daughters and coheiresses of Sir Alan Durward and wife Marjory, illegitimate daughter of Alexander II of Scotland. Colban and Anna had a son, Duncan, who succeeded as Earl of Fife at the age of eight, and a daughter, Marjory, who married Alan, Earl of Menteith. Colban died while still a young man. His date of death is disputed: G.W.S. Barrow gives 1272, but Bannerman gives 1270.

== Bibliography ==
- Grant, Rev'd Alexander, "The Ancient Earls of Fife", in Sir James Balfour Paul (ed.) The Scots Peerage, Volume IV, (Edinburgh, 1907), pp. 10–11
- Bannerman, John, "MacDuff of Fife," in A. Grant & K.Stringer (eds.) Medieval Scotland: Crown, Lordship and Community, Essays Presented to G.W.S. Barrow, (Edinburgh, 1993), pp. 20–38
- Barrow, G. W. S., The Kingdom of the Scots: Government, Church and Society from the Eleventh to the Fourteenth Century, (Edinburgh, 2003)
- Ravilious, J., "The Earls of Menteith: Murdoch, Earl of Menteith and the Ferrers family of Groby", The Scottish Genealogist (March 2013), Vol. LX, No. 1, pp. 12–25.
- Hammond, Matthew, "Hostiarii Regis Scotie: the Durward family in the thirteenth century," in Steve Boardman and Alasdair Ross, eds., The Exercise of Power in Medieval Scotland, c. 1200-1500 (Dublin: Four Courts Press, 2003), pp. 118–138

Preceded by Malcolm	Earl of Fife; 1266–1270/2	Succeeded by Duncan
