= Thomas Bisset =

Scottish knight

Sir Thomas Bisset (died 1366) Lord of Upsetlington, was a Scottish knight who was a crusader and by his second marriage was jure uxoris Earl of Fife between 1363 and 1366, when he died.

== Life ==
Thomas was the grandson of William Bisset of Upsettlington. He is known to have been a crusader, participating in a campaign in Prussia. For his second marriage he betrothed Isabella, Countess of Fife. Thomas was her third husband. They had no issue when he died in 1366.

He was succeeded by his son Thomas, from his wife of his first marriage, whose name is currently unknown.
