= Donnchadh III, Earl of Fife =

Earl of Fife from 1270 to 1288

Donnchadh III

Earl of Fife
- In office 1270–1288

Donnchadh III or Duncan was Earl of Fife (or Mormaer) from 1270 to 1288.

He succeeded as only a child, the son of the previous Mormaer Colbán, who died young. During his minority, William Wishart, Bishop of St Andrews, became custos of the Mormaerdom. Perhaps owing to a power-struggle within the Mormaerdom, the Bishop confiscated some lands from the MacDuib chief, head of Fife's Gaelic society. Later, King Edward I of England ordered the Guardians of Scotland to restore these lands. Donnchadh himself was one of these guardians, responsible for supervising the government of Scotland in the absence of the King. He had in 1284 joined with other Scottish noblemen who acknowledged Margaret of Norway as the heir of Alexander III.

Donnchadh married Johanna (or Joan), daughter of Gilbert de Clare, 7th Earl of Gloucester by his first wife Alice de Lusignan (div. 1271) and had at least two sons, Duncan and an anonymous MacDuibh (=MacDuff). The latter's first name is unknown, but the style implies he was head of Clann mac Duib. He also had a daughter, Isabella, who married John Comyn, Earl of Buchan.

The Mormaer's last historical appearance is in a document (possibly after his death) dated August 1289. He was murdered in his prime at Pittillock near Falkland, Fife, while on his way to Dunfermline, the seat of Scottish government at that time, by some of his kinsmen in September. The Chronicle of Lanercost called the mormaer "cruel and greedy beyond the average" (Barrow, Robert Bruce, p. 332, note 33). He was buried at Cupar Abbey.

== Sources ==
- Bannerman, John; "MacDuff of Fife", in A. Grant and K. Stringer (eds.), Medieval Scotland: Crown, Lordship and Community, Essays, presented to G. W. S. Barrow, Edinburgh, 1993, pp. 20–38.
- Barrow, G. W. S.; Robert Bruce and the Community of the Realm of Scotland, Edinburgh, 1988.
- Rymer, Thomas; Foedera Conventiones, Literae et cuiuscunque generis Acta Publica inter Reges Angliae, London, 1745, (Latin).

Preceded by Colbán	Mormaer of Fife; 1270–1288	Succeeded by Donnchadh IV
