= Robert II of Scotland =

King of Scots from 1371 to 1390

Robert II
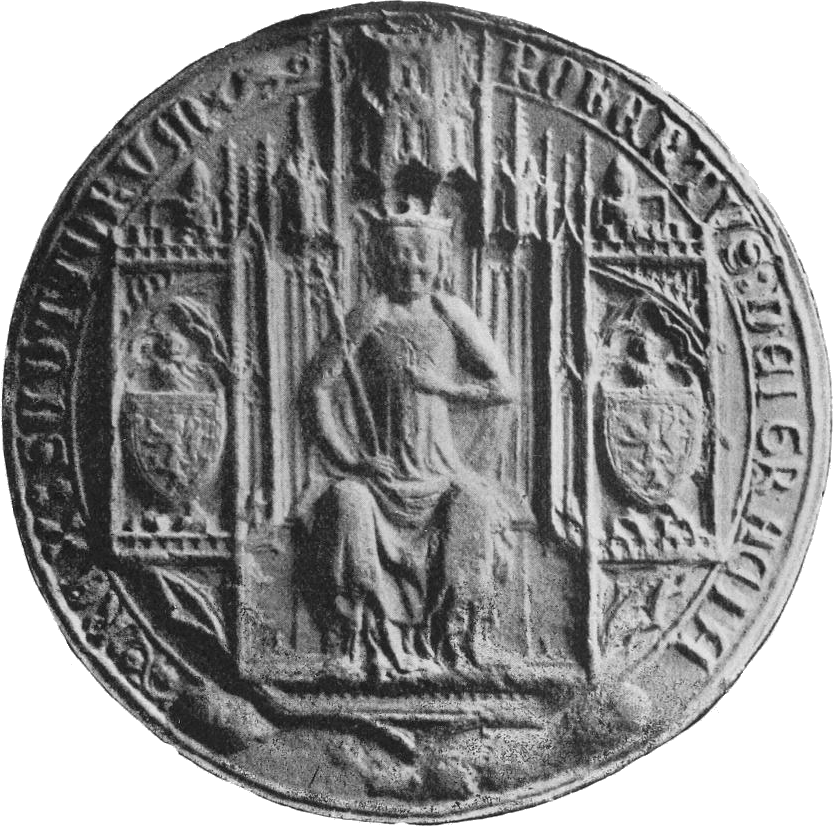
- Great Seal of Robert II

King of Scots
- Reign: 22 February 1371 – 19 April 1390
- Coronation: 26 March 1371
- Predecessor: David II
- Successor: Robert III
- Regents: See list: John Stewart, Earl of Carrick (1384–1388); Robert Stewart, Earl of Fife (1388–1390)
- Born: 2 March 1316; Paisley Abbey, Renfrewshire, Scotland
- Died: 19 April 1390 (aged 74); Dundonald Castle, Ayrshire, Scotland
- Burial: Scone Abbey
- Spouses: Elizabeth Mure (m. 1336; died 1355) Euphemia de Ross (m. 1355; died 1386)
- Issue more...: Robert III; Walter, Lord of Fife; Robert, Duke of Albany; Alexander, Earl of Buchan; David, Earl of Caithness; Walter, Earl of Atholl; Elizabeth, Countess of Crawford; Thomas, Bishop of St. Andrews; Egidia Stewart
- House: Stewart
- Father: Walter Stewart, 6th High Steward of Scotland
- Mother: Marjorie Bruce

Robert II (2 March 1316 – 19 April 1390) was King of Scots from 1371 to his death in 1390. The son of Walter Stewart, 6th High Steward of Scotland, and Marjorie, daughter of King Robert the Bruce, he was named Robert Stewart. Upon the death of his uncle David II, Robert succeeded to the throne as the first monarch of the House of Stuart.

Edward Bruce had been the heir presumptive for his older brother, King Robert the Bruce, but Edward had no children when he was killed in the Battle of Faughart on 14 October 1318. Marjorie Bruce died, likely in 1317, following a riding accident. After her death, Parliament named her infant son, Robert Stewart, as heir presumptive. However, this lapsed on 5 March 1324 with the birth of a son, David, to King Robert and his second wife, Elizabeth de Burgh. Robert Stewart became High Steward of Scotland on his father's death on 9 April 1327, and in the same year, Parliament confirmed the young Steward as heir should David die childless. In 1329, King Robert I died, and his five-year-old son succeeded to the throne as David II under the guardianship of Thomas Randolph, 1st Earl of Moray.

Edward Balliol, son of King John Balliol—assisted by the English and those Scottish nobles whom Robert I had disinherited—invaded Scotland, inflicting heavy defeats on the Bruce party on 11 August 1332 at Dupplin Moor. In the early morning hours of 16 December 1332, then sixteen-year-old Robert and Sir Archibald Douglas defeated Balliol at the Battle of Annan and drove him from Scotland. Balliol returned the following year with King Edward III and an English army. They defeated Archibald Douglas at the Battle of Halidon Hill on 19 July 1333. Robert, who had fought at Halidon, joined his uncle David in refuge in Dumbarton Castle. David escaped to France in 1334, and Parliament, still functioning, appointed Robert and John Randolph, 3rd Earl of Moray as joint guardians of the kingdom. The English captured Randolph in July 1335, while, in the same year, Robert submitted to Balliol, bringing about the removal of his guardianship. His former position was reinstated in 1338 and remained in effect until David returned from France in June 1341. Hostilities continued, and Robert was with David at the Neville's Cross on 17 October 1346, and either escaped or fled the field. David, however, was captured and remained a prisoner until he was ransomed in October 1357.

Robert married Elizabeth Mure around 1348, thus legitimising their four sons and five daughters. His subsequent marriage to Euphemia de Ross in 1355 produced two sons and two surviving daughters. Though Robert rebelled against King David in 1363, he submitted after a threat was made to his right of succession. Upon David’s death in 1371, Robert succeeded him at the age of fifty-five. The border magnates continued to attack English-held zones in southern Scotland, and by 1384, the Scots had re-taken most of the occupied lands. Robert ensured that Scotland was included in the Anglo-French truce of 1384, a factor in the coup in November when he lost control of the country, firstly to his eldest son John, and then from 1388 to John's younger brother, Robert. King Robert II died in Dundonald Castle in 1390 and was buried at Scone Abbey.

== Heir presumptive ==
Robert Stewart, born in 1316, was the only child of King Robert I's daughter Marjorie Bruce, who died either in childbirth or shortly afterwards, and Walter Stewart, 6th High Steward of Scotland. Robert had the upbringing of a Gaelic noble on the Stewart lands in Bute, Clydeside, and in Renfrew. In 1315, parliament revoked Marjorie Bruce's right as heir to her father in favour of her uncle, Edward Bruce. Edward was killed at the Battle of Faughart, near Dundalk on 14 October 1318, resulting in a hastily arranged Parliament in December to enact a new tailzie naming Marjorie's son, Robert, as heir should the king die without a successor. The birth of a son, afterwards David II, to King Robert on 5 March 1324 cancelled Robert Stewart's position as heir presumptive, but a Parliament at Cambuskenneth in July 1326 restored him in the line of succession should David die without an heir. This reinstatement of his status was accompanied by the gift of lands in Argyll, Roxburghshire, and the Lothians.

== High Steward of Scotland ==
=== Renewed war for independence ===
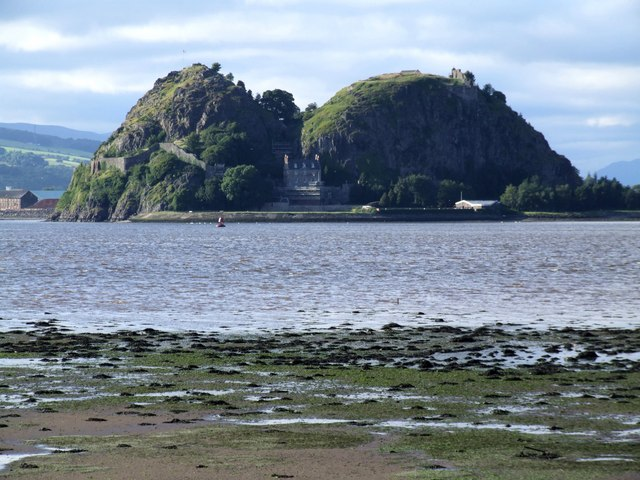
Dumbarton Castle on Dumbarton Rock where Robert Stewart and King David took refuge in 1333

The first war of independence began in the reign of King John Balliol. His short reign was bedevilled by Edward I's insistence on his overlordship of Scotland. The Scottish leadership, concluding that only war could end the English king’s systematic erosion of Balliol's sovereignty, finalised a treaty of reciprocal assistance with France in October 1295. The Scots forayed into England in March 1296 — this incursion together with the French treaty angered the English king and provoked an invasion of Scotland taking Berwick on 30 March before defeating the Scots army at Dunbar on 27 April. John Balliol submitted to Edward and resigned the throne to him before being sent to London as a prisoner. Despite this, resistance to the English led by William Wallace and Andrew Moray had emerged in the name of King John Balliol. On their deaths, Robert the Bruce continued to resist the English and eventually succeeded in defeating the forces of Edward II of England and gained the Scottish throne for himself.

David Bruce, aged five, became king on 7 June 1329 after his father's death. Walter the Steward had died earlier on 9 April 1327, and the orphaned eleven-year-old Robert was placed under the guardianship of his uncle, Sir James Stewart of Durrisdeer, who along with Thomas Randolph, Earl of Moray, and William Lindsey, Archdeacon of St Andrews were appointed as joint guardians of the kingdom. David's accession kindled the second independence war, which threatened Robert's position as heir. In 1332 Edward Balliol, son of the deposed John Balliol, spearheaded an attack on the Bruce sovereignty with the tacit support of King Edward III of England and the explicit endorsement of "the disinherited". Edward Balliol's forces delivered heavy defeats on the Bruce supporters at Dupplin Moor on 11 August 1332 and again at Halidon Hill on 19 July 1333, at which the 17-year-old Robert participated. Robert's estates were overrun by Balliol, who granted them to David Strathbogie, titular earl of Atholl. Robert evaded capture and gained protection at Dumbarton Castle, where King David was also taking refuge. Very few other strongholds remained in Scottish hands in the winter of 1333 — only the castles of Kildrummy (held by Christina Bruce, elder sister of Robert I and wife of Andrew Murray of Bothwell), Loch Leven, Loch Doon, and Urquhart held out against Balliol forces.

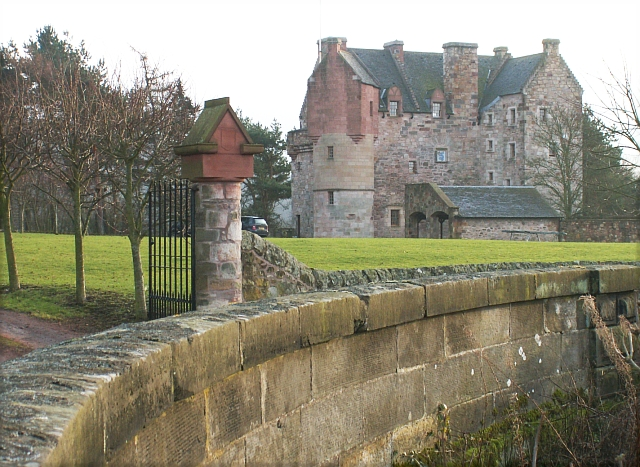
Dairsie Castle where the 1335 Parliament was held

In May 1334, the situation looked dire for the house of Bruce, and David II fled to safety in France. Robert set about winning back his lands in western Scotland. Strathbogie came over to the Bruce interest after disagreements with his fellow "disinherited", but his fierce opposition to Randolph came to a head at a Parliament held at Dairsie Castle in early 1335, when Strathbogie received Robert's support. Strathbogie once again changed sides, submitting to the English king in August and was made Warden of Scotland. Robert likely submitted to Edward in September 1335, relinquishing the guardianship by early December.

The Bruce resistance to Balliol may have been verging on collapse in 1335, but a turn-around in its fortunes began with the appearance of Sir Andrew Moray of Bothwell as a potent war leader at the Battle of Culblean. Moray had been captured in 1332, ransomed himself in 1334, and immediately sped north to lay siege to Dundarg Castle in Buchan, held by Sir Henry de Beaumont, with the castle falling on 23 December 1334. Moray was appointed guardian at Dunfermline during the winter of 1335–1336 while besieging Cupar Castle in Fife. He died at his castle in Avoch in 1338, and Robert resumed the guardianship. Murray's campaign ended any chance of Edward III having full lasting control over the south of Scotland and Edward's failure in the six-month siege of Dunbar Castle confirmed this. Balliol lost many of his major supporters to the Bruce side and the main English garrisons began to fall to the Scots — Cupar in the spring or summer of 1339, Perth taken by the combined armies of Sir William Douglas, Lord of Liddesdale, Robert Stewart and Maurice Murray of Drumsargard in June 1339. Edinburgh was taken by stratagem by William Douglas of Liddesdale in April 1341.

John Randolph was released from English custody in a prisoner exchange in 1341 and visited David II in Normandy before returning to Scotland. Just as Randolph was a favourite of the king, David II mistrusted Robert Stewart with his powerful positions of heir presumptive and guardian of Scotland. At the beginning of June 1341, the kingdom appeared sufficiently stable to allow the king to return to a land where his nobles, while fighting for the Bruce cause, had considerably increased their own power bases. On 17 October 1346, Robert accompanied David into battle at Neville's Cross, where many Scottish nobles including Randolph, died — David II was wounded and captured while Robert and Patrick, earl of March had apparently fled the field.

=== King David's captivity ===
Petitions to the Pope, 1342–1419

The kings of France and Scotland, bishops William of St. Andrews, William of Glasgow, William of Aberdeen, Richard of Dunkeld, Martin of Argyle, Adam of Brechin, and Maurice of Dunblane. Signification that although Elizabeth Mor and Isabella Boutellier, noble damsels of the diocese of Glasgow, are related in the third and fourth degrees of kindred, Robert Steward of Scotland, lord of Stragrifis, in the diocese of Glasgow, the king's nephew, carnally knew first Isabella, and afterwards, in ignorance of their kindred, Elizabeth, who was herself related to Robert in the fourth degree of kindred, living with her for some time and having many children of both sexes by her; the above king and bishops, therefore, pray the pope that for the sake of the said offspring, who are fair to behold (aspectibus gratiose), to grant a dispensation to Robert and Elizabeth to intermarry, and to declare their offspring legitimate.

To be granted by the diocesan, at whose discretion one or more chapelries are to be founded by Robert.

Avignon, 10 Kal. Dec. 1347

With the king now imprisoned in England and Randolph dead, the guardianship once again fell to Robert. In 1347 he took the important step of ensuring the legitimation of his four sons, John, Earl of Carrick (the future King Robert III), Walter, Lord of Fife (d. 1362), Robert (the future Duke of Albany) and Alexander, Lord of Badenoch (and future Earl of Buchan), and six daughters by petitioning Pope Clement VI to allow a canon law marriage to Elizabeth Mure.

Even though an English prisoner, David retained influence in Scotland and Robert had his guardianship removed by parliament and given jointly to the earls of Mar and Ross and the lord of Douglas — this did not last and Robert was once again appointed guardian by the Parliament of February 1352. The paroled David attended this Parliament to present to Robert and the members of the Three Estates the conditions for his release. These contained no ransom demand but required the Scots to name the English prince John of Gaunt as heir presumptive. The Council rejected these terms, with Robert opposing a proposal that threatened his right of succession. The king had no option but to return to captivity — the English chronicler Henry Knighton wrote of the event:

... the Scots refused to have their King unless he entirely renounced the influence of the English, and similarly refused to submit themselves to them. And they warned him that they would neither ransom him nor allow him to be ransomed unless he pardoned them for all their acts and injuries that they had done, and all the offences that they had committed during the time of captivity, and he should give them security for that, or otherwise, they threatened to choose another king to rule them.

By 1354, ongoing negotiations for the king's release reached the stage where a proposal of a straight ransom payment of 90,000 marks to be repaid over nine years, guaranteed by the provision of 20 high-ranking hostages, was agreed upon — this understanding was destroyed by Robert when he bound the Scots to a French action against the English in 1355. The capture of Berwick together with the presence of the French on English soil jolted Edward III into moving against the Scots — in January 1356 Edward led his forces into the south-east of Scotland burning Edinburgh and Haddington and much of the Lothians in a campaign that became known as the "Burnt Candlemas". After Edward's victory over France in September, the Scots resumed negotiations for David's release, ending in October 1357 with the Treaty of Berwick. Its terms were that in return for David's freedom, a ransom of 100,000 marks would be paid in annual instalments over ten years — only the first two payments were made by the Scottish Council and probably by Robert himself. This may have resulted in The Rebellion of the Three Earls in 1363 by Robert and the earls of Douglas and March, which was ultimately unsuccessful. Later French inducements could not bring David to their aid, and the country remained at peace with England during the rest of his reign.

== King of Scots ==
=== Consolidation of Stewart power and personal rule ===
David died childless on 22 February 1371 and was succeeded by Robert II. David was buried at Holyrood Abbey almost immediately but an armed protest by William, Earl of Douglas, delayed Robert II's coronation until 26 March 1371. The reasons for the incident remain unclear but may have involved a dispute regarding Robert's right of succession, or may have been directed against George Dunbar, Earl of March (also known as Earl of Dunbar), and the southern justiciar, Robert Erskine. It was resolved by Robert giving his daughter Isabella in marriage to Douglas's son, James and with Douglas replacing Erskine as justiciar south of the Forth. Robert's accession did affect some others who held offices from David II. In particular, George Dunbar's brother John Dunbar, the Lord of Fife who lost his claim on Fife and Sir Robert Erskine's son, Sir Thomas Erskine who lost control of Edinburgh Castle.

The Stewarts greatly increased their holdings in the west, in Atholl, and in the far north: the earldoms of Fife and Menteith went to Robert's second surviving son, Robert; the earldoms of Buchan and Ross (along with the lordship of Badenoch) to his fourth son, Alexander; and the earldoms of Strathearn and Caithness to the eldest son of his second marriage, David. King Robert's sons-in-law were John MacDonald, Lord of the Isles, John Dunbar, Earl of Moray, and James who would become the 2nd Earl of Douglas. Robert's sons John, Earl of Carrick, the king's heir, and Robert, Earl of Fife, were installed as keepers of the castles of Edinburgh and Stirling respectively. Alexander, Lord of Badenoch and Ross, and afterwards Earl of Buchan, became the king's justiciar and lieutenant in the north of the kingdom. This growth in the Stewart family influence did not appear to cause resentment among the senior magnates — the king generally did not threaten their territories or local rule, and where titles were transferred to his sons, the individuals affected were usually very well rewarded. This style of kingship was very different from his predecessor's — David tried to dominate his nobles, while Robert's strategy was to delegate authority to his powerful sons and earls, and this generally worked for the first decade of his reign. Robert was to influence eight of the fifteen earldoms either directly through his sons, or by strategic marriages of his daughters to powerful lords.

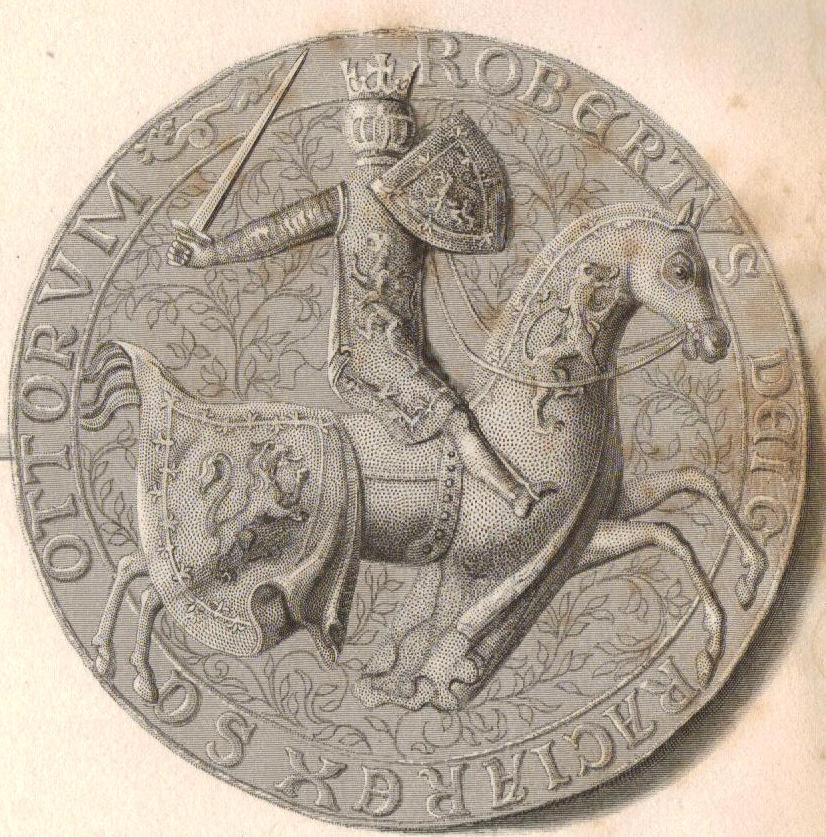
Robert the warrior and knight: the reverse side of Robert II's Great Seal, enhanced as a 19th-century steel engraving

In 1373, Robert secured the future of the Stewart dynasty by having Parliament enact entailments governing the succession. At this time, none of his sons had heirs, so it became necessary to devise a system that precisely defined the circumstances in which each might inherit the crown—without in any way displacing the normal operation of primogeniture. By 1375, the king had commissioned John Barbour to write the poem, The Brus, a history intended to bolster the public image of the Stewarts as the genuine heirs of Robert I. It described the patriotic acts of both Sir James, the Black Douglas and Walter the Steward, the king's father, in their support of Bruce. Robert's rule during the 1370s saw the country's finances stabilised and greatly improved due in part to the flourishing wool trade, reduced calls on the public purse and the halting of his predecessor's ransom payments after Edward III's death. Robert — unlike David II, whose kingship was predominantly Lothian and therefore lowland-based — did not restrict his attention to one sector of his kingdom but frequently visited the more remote areas of the north and west among his Gaelic lords.

Robert ruled over a country that continued to have English enclaves within its borders and Scots who gave their allegiance to the king of England — the important castles of Berwick, Jedburgh, Lochmaben and Roxburgh had English garrisons and controlled southern Berwickshire, Teviotdale and large areas in Annandale and Tweeddale. In June 1371, Robert agreed a defensive treaty with the French; although there were no outright hostilities in 1372, the English garrisons were reinforced and maintained at a heightened state of vigilance. Attacks on the English-held zones, with the near-certain backing of Robert, began in 1373 and accelerated in the years 1375–77. This indicated that a central decision had probably been taken for the escalation of the conflict rather than the previous small-scale marauding attacks by the border barons. In 1376, the Earl of March successfully recovered Annandale, but then found himself constrained by the Bruges Anglo-French truce.

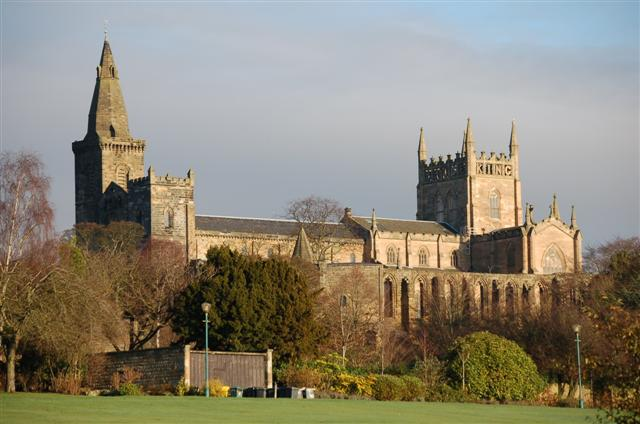
Dunfermline Abbey, which received Coldingham Priory as a daughter house from King Robert

In his dealings with Edward III, Robert blamed his border magnates for the mounting attacks on English-held areas. Regardless, the Scots held on to the recaptured lands, often granted to minor local lords to ensure their interest in preventing English repossession. Despite Robert's further condemnations of his border lords, all the signs were that Robert backed the growing successful Scottish militancy following Edward III's death in 1377. In a charter dated 25 July 1378, the king mandated that Coldingham Priory would no longer be a daughter house of the English Durham Priory but would be attached to Dunfermline Abbey. In early February, the Scots — apparently unaware of the conclusion of an Anglo-French truce on 26 January 1384 that included the Scots in the cease-fire — conducted an all-out attack on the English zones, winning back Lochmaben Castle and Teviotdale. John of Gaunt led a reciprocal English attack that took him as far as Edinburgh, where the burgesses bribed him to leave the town unharmed. Haddington, however, was destroyed. Carrick and James, Earl of Douglas (his father William had died in April), wanted a retaliatory strike for the Gaunt raid. Robert may have concluded that, as the French had reneged on a previous agreement to send assistance in 1383 and then entered into a truce with England, any military action would have been met with retaliation and exclusion from the forthcoming Boulogne peace talks. On 2 June 1384, Robert resolved to send Walter Wardlaw, Bishop of Glasgow to the Anglo-French peace talks, however, Carrick ignored this and allowed raids into the north of England to take place. Despite this, by 26 July, the Scots were part of the truce that would expire in October. Robert called a Council in September, probably to decide how to proceed when the truce concluded.

=== Loss of authority and death ===
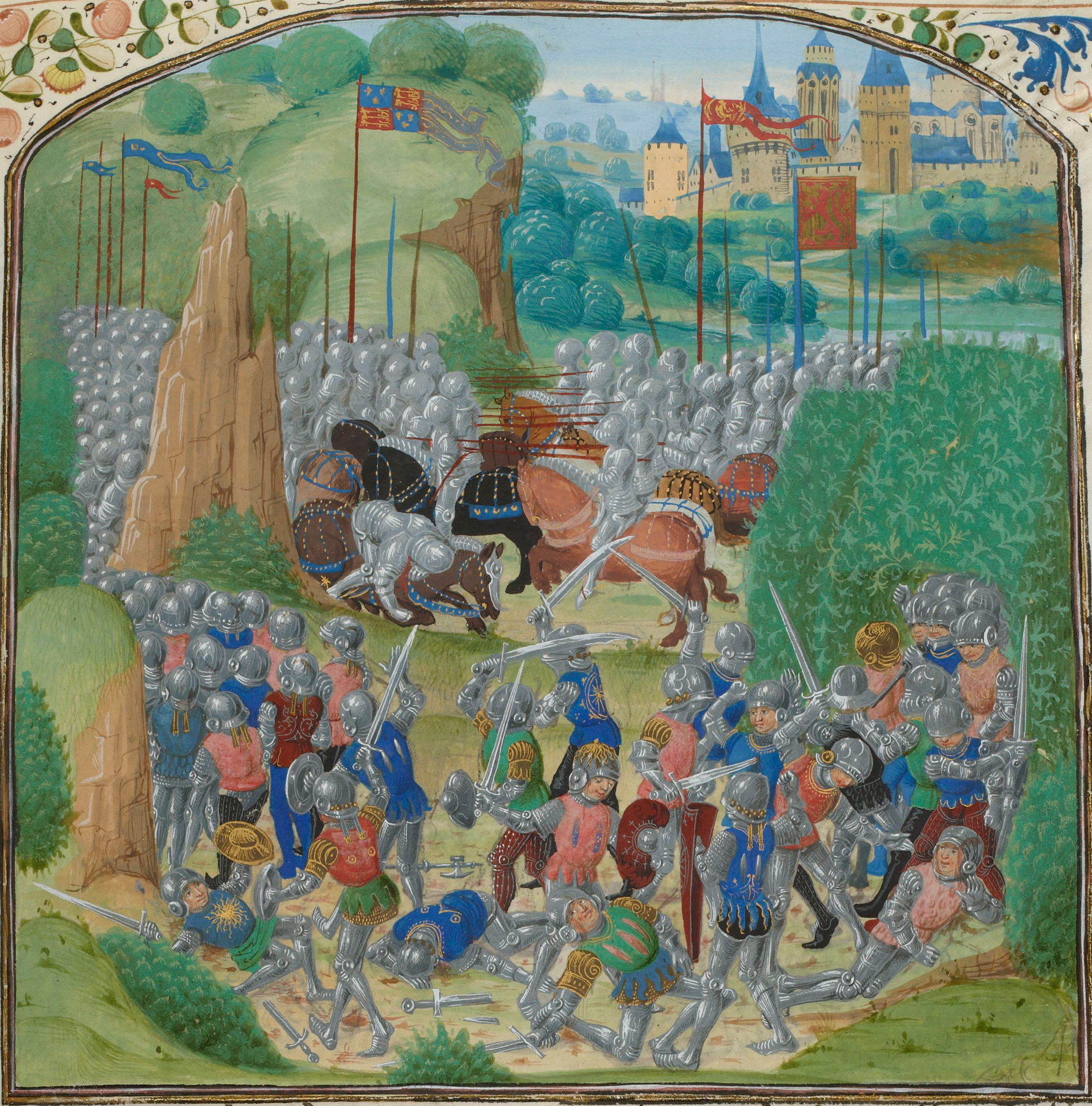
A medieval miniature depicting the Battle of Otterburn where Carrick's close ally, James, Earl of Douglas, was killed

Robert's son, John Earl of Carrick, had become the foremost Stewart magnate south of the Forth, just as Alexander, Earl of Buchan, was in the north. Alexander's activities and methods of royal administration, enforced by Gaelic mercenaries, drew criticism from northern earls and bishops and his younger half-brother David, Earl of Strathearn. These complaints damaged the king's standing within the Council leading to criticism of his ability to curb Buchan's activities. Robert's differences with the Carrick affinity regarding the conduct of the war and his continued failure or unwillingness to deal with Buchan in the north led to the political convulsion of November 1384 when the Council removed the king's authority to govern and appointed Carrick as lieutenant of the kingdom — a coup d'état had taken place. With Robert sidelined, there was no longer any impediment to war. In June 1385, a force of 1200 French soldiers joined the Scots in a campaign that involved the Earl of Douglas and two of Robert's sons, John, Earl of Carrick, and Robert, Earl of Fife. The skirmishes made small gains, but a quarrel between the French and Scottish commanders resulted in the abandonment of an attack on the important castle of Roxburgh.

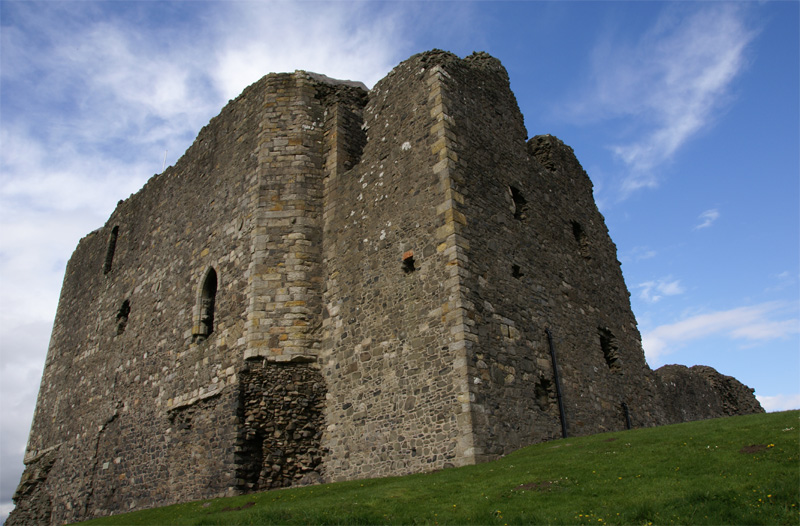
Dundonald Castle, where Robert II died in 1390

The Scots' victory over the English at the Battle of Otterburn in Northumberland in August 1388 set in motion Carrick's fall from power. One of the Scottish casualties was Carrick's close ally James, Earl of Douglas. Douglas died without an heir, which led to various claims upon the title and estate — Carrick backed Malcolm Drummond, the husband of Douglas's sister, while Fife sided with the successful appellant, Sir Archibald Douglas, Earl of Wigtown and Lord of Galloway, who possessed an entail on the Douglas estates. Fife, now with his powerful Douglas ally, and those who supported the king ensured a countercoup at the December Council meeting when the guardianship of Scotland passed from Carrick (who had recently been badly injured from a horse-kick) to Fife. Many had also approved of Fife's intention to properly resolve the situation of lawlessness in the north and in particular the activities of his younger brother, Buchan. Fife relieved Buchan of his offices of lieutenant of the north and justiciar north of the Forth. The latter role was given to Fife's son, Murdoch Stewart. Robert II toured the northeast in late January 1390, perhaps to reinforce the change of political direction in the north following Buchan's removal from authority. In March, Robert returned to Dundonald Castle in Ayrshire, where he died on 19 April and was buried at Scone on 25 April.

== Historiography ==
The reign of Robert II has undergone a re-appraisal since the works of historians Gordon Donaldson (1967) and Ranald Nicholson (1974). Donaldson admitted to a lack of knowledge (at the time he was writing) regarding Robert's reign and accepted that the early chroniclers writing near his reign found little to criticise. Robert's career before and after he succeeded to the throne is described by Donaldson as "to say the least, undistinguished, and his reign did nothing to add lustre to it." Donaldson goes further and debates the legality of the canon law marriage of Robert and Elizabeth Mure following the papal dispensation, but acknowledges that the Acts of Succession in 1371 and 1372, although sealing the matter in the eyes of Parliament, did not end the generational feud of the descendants of Elizabeth Mure and Euphemia Ross. Robert's earlier participation in combat at the battles of Halidon and Neville's Cross, according to Donaldson, had made him wary of sanctioning military expeditions against the English and that any such actions by his barons were concealed from him. Similarly, Nicholson described Robert's reign as deficient and that his lack of the skills of governance led to internal strife. Nicholson asserts that the Earl of Douglas was bought off following his armed demonstration just before Robert's coronation, and associates this with the doubt surrounding the legitimacy of Robert's sons with Elizabeth Mure.

In contrast, the historians Stephen Boardman (2007), Alexander Grant (1984 and 1992) and Michael Lynch (1992) give a more even-handed appraisal of Robert II's life. Modern historians show a kingdom that had become wealthier and more stable, particularly during the first decade of his rule. Boardman explains that Robert II was subjected to negative propaganda while he was High Steward — David II's followers denigrated his conduct during his lieutenancies and described them as "tyranny" — and again later as King when the supporters of his son John, Earl of Carrick said that Robert was a king lacking drive and accomplishments, weighed down by age and unfit to govern. Robert II's association with Gaelic Scotland also drew criticism. He grew up in his ancestral lands in the west, at ease with the Gaelic language and culture, and had a strong relationship with the Gaelic lords in the Hebrides, upper Perthshire and Argyll. Throughout his reign, Robert spent long periods in his Gaelic heartlands and complaints at the time in Lowland Scotland seem to have been influenced by the view that the king was too much involved in Gaelic concerns. Boardman also asserts that much of the negative views held of Robert II find their origins in the writings of the French chronicler Jean Froissart who recorded that '[the king] had red bleared eyes, of the colour of sandalwood, which clearly showed that he was no valiant man, but one who would remain at home than march to the field'. Contrary to Froissart's view, the early Scottish chroniclers — Andrew of Wyntoun and Walter Bower (who both utilised a source that was nearly contemporary with Robert II) — and later 15th and 16th century Scottish chroniclers and poets showed "Robert II as a Scottish patriotic hero, a defender of the integrity of the Scottish kingdom, and as the direct heir to Robert I".

Grant (1992) acknowledges that Robert II's reign in terms of foreign and domestic policy was "not so unsuccessful". As far as William, Earl of Douglas's reaction was concerned when he staged an armed demonstration before Robert's coronation, Grant does not hold to the view that Douglas was in some way demonstrating against Robert's legitimate right to the throne, but more an assertion that royal patronage should not continue as in the time of David II. Grant also advocates that the demonstration was aimed at father and son Robert and Thomas Erskine, who held the castles of Edinburgh, Stirling and Dumbarton from Robert's predecessor. Grant seriously called into question the dependability of Froissart's writings as an effective source for Robert II's reign. Influential magnate coalitions headed by Carrick, having undermined the king's position, manipulated the Council of November 1384 to remove Robert II from any real power. Grant gives little weight to the asserted senility of Robert and suggests that the deposition of Carrick in 1388, and then the resolution to join the Anglo-French truce of 1389, were both at the instigation of Robert II. Yet authority was not handed back to Robert II but to Carrick's younger brother, Robert, earl of Fife; this once again saw the king at the disposition of one of his sons. Despite this, the now unknown source whom both Wyntoun and Bower relied on made the point that Fife deferred to his father on affairs of state emphasising the difference in styles in the guardianships of his two sons.

Michael Lynch points out that Robert II's reign from 1371 until the lieutenancy of Carrick in 1384 had been one exemplified by continued prosperity and stability — a time which Abbot Bower described as a period of "tranquillity, prosperity and peace". Lynch suggests that the troubles of the 1450s between James II and the Douglases (which some historians have interpreted as the legacy of Robert II's policy of encouraging powerful lordships), was a continuation of David II's build-up of local lords in the Marches and Galloway — Robert was satisfied with government to leave alone the Douglas and the Stewart earls in their fiefdoms. The weakening of government if anything, Lynch suggests, came not before the 1384 coup but after it, even though the coup had at its root Robert II's favouring of his third son, Alexander Stewart, Earl of Buchan (known as "the Wolf of Badenoch").

== Marriages and issue ==
In 1336, he first married Elizabeth Mure (died 1355), daughter of Sir Adam Mure of Rowallan. The marriage was criticised for being uncanonical, so he remarried her in 1349 after receiving a papal dispensation in 1347.

From this union, ten children reached adulthood:

- John (died 1406), who became King of Scotland as Robert III, married Anabella Drummond;
- Walter (died in 1362), husband of Isabella MacDuff, Countess of Fife;
- Robert, Earl of Fife, and from 1398 Duke of Albany (died 1420), married in 1361 Margaret Graham, Countess of Menteith, and his second wife in 1381 Muriella Keith (died in 1449);
- Alexander Stewart, Earl of Buchan (died 1405), nicknamed "the Wolf of Badenoch", married in 1382 to Euphemia of Ross;
- Margaret, married John of Islay, Lord of the Isles;
- Marjorie, married John Dunbar, Earl of Moray, then Sir Alexander Keith;
- Elizabeth, married Thomas de la Hay, Lord High Constable of Scotland;
- Isabel (died 1410), married James Douglas, 2nd Earl of Douglas (died in 1388), followed in 1389 by John Edmonstone of that Ilk;
- Johanna (Jean), married Sir John Keith (died 1375), then John Lyon, Lord of Glamis (died 1383), and finally, Sir James Sandilands;
- Katherine, married Sir Robert Logan of Grugar and Restalrig, Lord High Admiral of Scotland.

In 1355, Robert married his second wife Euphemia de Ross (died 1387), daughter of Hugh, Earl of Ross. They had four children:

- David Stewart, Earl of Strathearn, born about 1356 and died in 1389;
- Walter Stewart, Earl of Atholl, born about 1360, was beheaded at Edinburgh in 1437 for being involved in the assassination of King James I;
- Elizabeth, who married in 1380 David Lindsay, 1st Earl of Crawford;
- Egidia, who married in 1387 William Douglas of Nithsdale.

King Robert II also had many illegitimate children:

By Mariota de Cardeny, daughter of Sir John Cardeny, and widow of Alexander Mac Naugthon:

- Alexander Stewart, of Inverlunan;
- Sir John Stewart, of Cardeny;
- James Stewart, of Abernethy and Kinfauna;
- Walter Stewart.

By Moira Leitch (according to tradition):

- Sir John Stewart, Sheriff of Bute (1360 – 1445/9), ancestor of the Marquesses of Bute

Other issue born by unknown women:

- John Stewart, Lord of Burley (killed 1425);
- Alexander Stewart, canon of Glasgow;
- Sir Alexander Stewart of Inverlunan;
- Thomas Stewart, Archdeacon of St Andrews, Dean of Dunkeld;
- James Stewart of Kinfauns;
- Walter Stewart;
- Maria or Mary Stewart, wife of Sir John de Danielstoun and mother of Sir Robert de Danielstoun of that Ilk (ancestor of Cunningham of Kilmaurs, and Maxwell of Calderwood).

== Ancestry ==
Ancestors of Robert II of Scotland

8. Alexander Stewart, 4th High Steward of Scotland
4. James Stewart, 5th High Steward of Scotland
9. Jean of Bute (apocryphal)
2. Walter Stewart, 6th High Steward of Scotland
10. Walter de Burgh, 1st Earl of Ulster
5. Egidia de Burgh
11. Aveline FitzJohn
1. Robert II of Scotland
12. Robert de Brus, 6th Lord of Annandale
6. Robert I of Scotland
13. Marjorie of Carrick
3. Marjorie Bruce
14. Domhnall I, Earl of Mar
7. Isabella of Mar
15. Elen ferch Llywelyn or Susanna, her sister

== Fictional portrayals ==
Robert II has been depicted in historical novels. They include:

- The Three Perils of Man; or, War, women, and witchcraft (1822) by James Hogg. The tale takes place in the reign of Robert II, whose "country enjoyed happiness and peace, all save a part adjoining to the borders of England." Part of the action takes place at Linlithgow Palace, where Robert promises to marry his daughter Margaret Stewart "to the knight who shall take that castle of Roxburgh out of the hands of the English". With Margaret adding her own terms, that "in case of his attempting and failing in the undertaking, he shall forfeit all his lands, castles, towns, and towers to me." In the absence of volunteers, Margaret vows to take the Castle herself, defeating Lord Musgrave and his mistress Jane Howard;
- The Lords of Misrule (1976) by Nigel Tranter. It covers events from c. 1388 to 1390 and depicts the last years of Robert II and the rise of Robert III of Scotland to the throne. As the elderly king has grown "feeble, weary and half-blind", his sons, daughters and other nobles campaign for power. An ungoverned Scotland is ravaged by their conflicts. Robert Stewart, Duke of Albany, and Alexander Stewart, Earl of Buchan, are prominently featured;
- Courting Favour (2000) by Nigel Tranter. Follows the career of John Dunbar, Earl of Moray in the courts of David II of Scotland and Robert II. John is a son-in-law to the latter and serves him as a diplomat.

== Sources ==
- Barrell, Andrew D.M. (2000), Medieval Scotland, Cambridge University Press, ISBN 0-521-58602-X
- Boardman, Stephen (2007), The Early Stewart Kings: Robert II and Robert III, 1371–1406, The Stewart Dynasty in Scotland Series, Edinburgh: John Donald, an imprint of Birlinn Ltd, ISBN 978-1-904607-68-7
- Boardman, S.I. (May 2006). "Robert II". Oxford Dictionary of National Biography. Oxford Dictionary of National Biography (online ed.). Oxford University Press. doi:10.1093/ref:odnb/23713. (Subscription, Wikipedia Library access or UK public library membership required.)
- Broun, Dauvit; MacGregor, Martin, eds. (2007), "The Gaelic World and the Early Stewart Court, Stephen Boardman", Mìorun Mòr nan Gall, 'The Great Ill-Will of the Lowlander'? Lowland Perceptions of the Highlands, Medieval and Modern (1st ed.), Glasgow: the Centre for Scottish and Celtic Studies, University of Glasgow, OCLC 540108870
- Brown, Keith M.; Tanner, Roland (2008), The History of the Scottish Parliament: Parliament and Politics In Scotland 1235–1560, vol. 1, Edinburgh University Press, ISBN 978-0-7486-1485-1
- Brown, Michael (2004), The Wars of Scotland, 1214–1371, Edinburgh University Press, ISBN 0-7486-1238-6
- Burns, Charles, ed. (1976), Calendar of Papal Letters to Scotland of Clement VII of Avignon, 1378–1394, Scottish History Society, ISBN 978-0-9500260-8-4
- Cowan, Edward J.; Finlay, Richard J., eds. (2002), "The Demonisation of King John Fiona Watson", The Power of the Past, Scottish History, Edinburgh: Edinburgh University Press, ISBN 0-7486-1420-6
- Donaldson, Gordon (1967), Scottish Kings, London: Batsford, 153229
- Duncan, A. A. M. (2004). "Murray, Sir Andrew, of Bothwell (1298–1338)". Oxford Dictionary of National Biography. Oxford Dictionary of National Biography (online ed.). Oxford University Press. doi:10.1093/ref:odnb/19590. (Subscription, Wikipedia Library access or UK public library membership required.)
- Fryde, E. B.; Greenway, D. E.; Porter, S.; Roy, I. (1996), Handbook of British Chronology, Guides and Handbooks (Third corrected ed.), Cambridge, UK: Cambridge University Press, ISBN 0-521-56350-X
- Grant, Alexander (1984), Independence and Nationhood, The New History of Scotland, London: Edward Arnold (Publishers, Ltd), ISBN 0-7131-6309-7
- Goodman, Anthony; Tuck, Anthony, eds. (1992), "The Otterburn War from the Scottish Point of View: Alexander Grant", War and Border Societies in the Middle Ages, Routledge, ISBN 0-415-08021-5
- Grant, Alexander; Stringer, Keith, eds. (1998), "Scotland without a King, 1329–1341, Bruce Webster", Medieval Scotland: Crown, Lordship and Community, Edinburgh: Edinburgh University Press, ISBN 0-7486-1110-X
- Hogg, James (1822), The Three Perils of Man; or, War, women, and witchcraft
- Jones, Michael; McKitterick, Rosamond; Abulafia, David; Reuter, Timothy; Luscombe, David Edward; Allmand, Christopher Thomas (2000), "Fourteenth-century Scotland, Alexander Grant", The New Cambridge Medieval History: c. 1300–1415, Cambridge University Press, ISBN 0-521-36290-3
- Lynch, Michael (1992), Scotland: A new History, London: Pimlico, ISBN 0-7126-9893-0
- Maxwell, Herbert (1897). Robert the Bruce and the struggle for Scottish independence. G.P. Putnam's sons.
- Nicholson, Ranald (1974), Scotland: The Later Middle Ages, The Edinburgh History of Scotland, Vol. 2, Edinburgh: Oliver and Boyd, ISBN 0-05-002038-2
- Oram, Richard, ed. (2001), "The House of Stewart, 1371–1625, Michael Penman", The Kings & Queens of Scotland, Stroud, Gloucestershire: Tempus Publishing Ltd, ISBN 0-7524-1991-9
- Paul, James Balfour, ed. (1904), The Scots Peerage, vol. I, Edinburgh: David Douglas
- Pearson, M. J. "Robert II: 1316–1390". Reader's Guide to British History. Routledge.
- Rogers, Clifford J. (1999), The Wars of Edward III: Sources and Interpretations, Boydell & Brewer, ISBN 0-85115-646-0
- Sadler, John (2006), Border Fury: England and Scotland at War 1296–1568, Longman, ISBN 1-4058-4022-6
- Tuck, Anthony; Goodman, Anthony, eds. (1992), "Otterburn from the Scottish point of View, Alexander Grant", War and Border Societies in the Middle Ages (1st ed.), Routledge, ISBN 0-415-08021-5
- Watson, Fiona (2007), "Independence, Wars of", The Oxford Companion to Scottish History (Oxford Reference Online. Oxford University Press ed.), Edinburgh: Edinburgh University Press
- Webster, Bruce (2004). "David II". Oxford Dictionary of National Biography. Oxford Dictionary of National Biography (online ed.). Oxford University Press. doi:10.1093/ref:odnb/3726. (Subscription, Wikipedia Library access or UK public library membership required.)
- Webster, Bruce (2004). "Balliol, Edward (b. in or after 1281, d. 1364)". Oxford Dictionary of National Biography. Oxford Dictionary of National Biography (online ed.). Oxford University Press. doi:10.1093/ref:odnb/1206. (Subscription, Wikipedia Library access or UK public library membership required.)
- Weir, Alison (1989), Britain's Royal Family: A Complete Genealogy, London: The Bodley Head, ISBN 0-370-31310-0

Robert II of Scotland House of Stewart Born: 1316 Died: 1390
Regnal titles
Preceded by David II	King of Scots; 22 February 1371 – 14 April 1390	Succeeded by Robert III
Peerage of Scotland
New title	Earl of Atholl; 1342 – 31 May 1367	Succeeded by John Stewart
New title	Earl of Strathearn; 1357 – 26/27 March 1371	Succeeded by David Stewart
Court offices
Preceded by Walter Stewart	High Steward of Scotland; 1327–1371	Succeeded by John Stewart
