= Walter Stewart, Lord of Fife =

Son of King Robert II of Scotland (c.1338–1362)

Walter Stewart (c.1338–1362) was the second son of Robert Stewart, 7th High Steward of Scotland (afterwards King Robert II) and Elizabeth Mure. He married Isabella, Countess of Fife between 21 July 1360 and 20 July 1361 and was styled Lord of Fife—he died in late 1362.
