= John Dunbar, Earl of Moray =

Scottish nobleman

John Dunbar, Earl of Moray (died between June 1391 and February 1392) was a Scottish nobleman.

== Life ==
John Dunbar was the son of Sir Patrick Dunbar and Lady Isabella Randolph, a daughter of Thomas Randolph, 1st Earl of Moray, and a younger brother to George I, Earl of March. Therefore, he was nephew of the previous Earl of Moray, John Randolph, 3rd Earl of Moray. However he did not inherit the earldom automatically. On his uncle's death it reverted to the crown, and was only awarded to him a few years later around 1374.

The Earl of Moray was one of the senior commanders under James Douglas, 2nd Earl of Douglas, who led the raid into England in July–August 1388 that culminated at the Battle of Otterburn, where he was in control of the right flank of the Scottish army. Some sources state that he spent the larger part of the fight without his helmet, because of the speed with which the English attacked.

John Dunbar died between June 1391 and February 1392 from wounds received from the Earl of Nottingham during a tournament. He married Marjorie Stewart, a daughter of Robert II of Scotland. They had three sons (Thomas, 2nd or 5th Earl of Moray, depending on how you count, Alexander and James) and one daughter (Euphemia).

== Depictions in fiction ==
He is an important character in Courting Favour, a historical novel by Nigel Tranter.
