= David Carnegie =

David Carnegie may refer to:

== Southesk ==
- David Carnegie of Colluthie (1559–1598), Scottish landowner and administrator
- David Carnegie, 1st Earl of Southesk (1575–1658), his son, Scottish Lord of Session and MP
- Sir David Carnegie, 1st Baronet (died 1708), grandson of 1st Earl, Scottish MP for Kincardineshire
- Sir David Carnegie, 4th Baronet (1753–1805), de jure 7th Earl, British MP for Aberdeen Burghs and Forfarshire
- David Carnegie (explorer) (1871–1900), son of 9th Earl, Scottish explorer and gold prospector in Western Australia
- David Carnegie, 4th Duke of Fife (born 1961), son and heir of James Carnegie, 3rd Duke of Fife and 12th Earl of Southesk

== Northesk ==
- David Carnegie, 2nd Earl of Northesk (before 1627–1679)
- David Carnegie, 3rd Earl of Northesk (1643–1688)
- David Carnegie, 4th Earl of Northesk (before 1685–1729)
- David Carnegie, 5th Earl of Northesk (1701–1741)
- David Carnegie, 10th Earl of Northesk (1865–1921), Scottish representative peer
- David Carnegie, 11th Earl of Northesk (1901–1963), Scottish representative peer and Olympic Skeleton medallist
- David Carnegie, 14th Earl of Northesk (1954–2010), Scottish peer

== Others ==
- David Carnegie (entrepreneur) (1772–1837), Scottish entrepreneur, founder of Carnegie Investment Bank
- David Carnegie (RAF officer) (1897–1964), Royal Air Force air vice-marshal
- David Carnegie (scientist) (1868–1949), Scottish scientist, politician, who worked for the Canadian government
