= Cranstoun =

Cranstoun may refer to:

== People ==
- Clan Cranstoun, Lowland Scottish clan
- Lord Cranstoun, title in the Peerage of Scotland
  - William Cranstoun, 1st Lord Cranstoun (died 1627), Scottish Lord of Parliament
  - John Cranstoun, 2nd Lord Cranstoun (died c. 1648), Scottish Lord of Parliament
  - William Cranstoun, 3rd Lord Cranstoun (c. 1620 – 1664), Scottish Lord of Parliament
  - James Cranstoun, 8th Lord Cranstoun (1755–96), officer of the Royal Navy
- George Cranstoun, Lord Corehouse (died 1850), Scottish advocate, judge and satirist
- Louisa Cranstoun Nisbett (1812–58), English actress
- Reuben Cranstoun Mowbray (1883–1955), newspaper editor and member of the South Australian parliament
- Si Cranstoun (born c. 1976), British singer

== Other ==
- HMS Cranstoun (K511), Captain-class frigate of the British Royal Navy that served in the last two years of World War II.
