= David Carnegie, 3rd Earl of Northesk =

Scottish aristocrat and landowner

Arms of the 1st to 6th and 15th Earls of Northesk

David Carnegie, 3rd Earl of Northesk (November 1643 – 3 October 1688) was a Scottish aristocrat and landowner.

== Early life ==
Carnegie was born in November 1643. He was the son of David Carnegie, 2nd Earl of Northesk and Lady Jean Maule. His younger brothers were James Carnegie, a member of the Parliament of Scotland, Patrick Carnegie of Lour, Alexander Carnegie (later Blair of Kinfauns). His sisters included Lady Jean Carnegie (second wife Colin Lindsay, 3rd Earl of Balcarres), and Lady Magdalene Carnegie (wife of John Moodie of Ardbikie).

His paternal grandparents were John Carnegie, 1st Earl of Northesk and Magdalen (née Haliburton) Erskine (widow of John Erskine of Dun and eldest daughter of Sir James Haliburton of Pitcur). His maternal grandparents were Patrick Maule, 1st Earl of Panmure and the former Frances Stanhope (a daughter of Sir Edward Stanhope, of Grimston).

== Career ==
He succeeded to his father's peerage in 1679. Lord Northesk signed the Test Act in 1685.

== Personal life ==
On 2 September 1669, Carnegie married Lady Elizabeth Lindsay, daughter of John Lindsay, 17th Earl of Crawford, and his wife, the former Lady Margaret Hamilton (a daughter of James Hamilton, 2nd Marquess of Hamilton). Together, they were the parents of two children:

- Christian Carnegie (d. 1744), who married James Graham, 1st Duke of Montrose in 1702.
- David Carnegie, 4th Earl of Northesk (1675–1729), who married Lady Margaret Wemyss, second daughter of James Wemyss, Lord Burntisland and Lady Margaret Wemyss, suo jure 3rd Countess of Wemyss (only daughter, by his third wife, of David Wemyss, 2nd Earl of Wemyss), in 1697.

Lord Northesk died on 3 October 1688 and was succeeded in his titles by his eldest son, David.

Peerage of Scotland
Preceded by David Carnegie	Earl of Northesk; 1679–1688	Succeeded by David Carnegie
