= Countess of Northesk =

Countess of Northesk is a title normally given to the wife of the Earl of Northesk. Women who have held this title include:

- Anne Carnegie, Countess of Northesk (1730-1779), wife of George Carnegie, 6th Earl of Northesk
- Jill Gomez, soprano (1942–2026), wife of Patrick Carnegy, 15th Earl of Northesk
