= William Cranstoun =

William Cranstoun may refer to:

- William Cranstoun, 1st Lord Cranstoun, Scottish Lord of Parliament
- William Cranstoun, 3rd Lord Cranstoun, Scottish Lord of Parliament
