= Robert Carnegie =

Robert Carnegie may refer to:

- Robert Carnegie, Lord Kinnaird (died 1566), Scottish landowner and judge
- Robert Carnegie, 13th Earl of Northesk (1926–1994), British landowner and farmer
- Robert Carnegie, 3rd Earl of Southesk (died 1688), Scottish nobleman
