= George Carnegie =

George Carnegie may refer to:

- George Carnegie, 6th Earl of Northesk, British naval officer
- George Carnegie, 9th Earl of Northesk, British nobleman and soldier
- Lord George William Carnegie, son of David Carnegie, 4th Duke of Fife
