= John Carnegie, 1st Earl of Northesk =

Scottish noble

The Right Honourable The Earl of Northesk
- Arms of the 1st to 6th and 15th Earls of Northesk
- Born: John Carnegie c. 1579
- Died: 8 January 1667 (aged 87–88)
- Spouse(s): Magdalen Haliburton (m. 1625; died 1650) Margery Maule (m. 1652; died 1667)
- Children: 6, including David
- Parent(s): David Carnegie; Eupheme Wemyss
- Relatives: David Carnegie, 1st Earl of Southesk (brother)

John Carnegie, 1st Earl of Northesk (c. 1579 – 8 January 1667), formerly 1st Earl of Ethie from 1647 to 1662, was a Scottish noble who supported the Royalist cause during the Wars of the Three Kingdoms.

== Early life ==
Carnegie was born c. 1579 and lived at Inglismaldie Castle. He was the son of David Carnegie of Colluthie and, his second wife, Euphame Wemyss (d. 1593), daughter of John Wemyss of Wemyss. His brother was David Carnegie, 1st Earl of Southesk.

His paternal grandparents were Sir Robert Carnegie of Kinnaird and Margaret Guthrie. Through his mother, he was a descendant of Henry Sinclair, 4th Lord Sinclair.

== Career ==
Carnegie had already been created Earl of Ethie and Lord Lour in 1647 but relinquished those titles in exchange for the 1662 creations. It was under the title Earl of Ethie that he was fined £6,000 under Cromwell's Act of Grace.

== Personal life ==
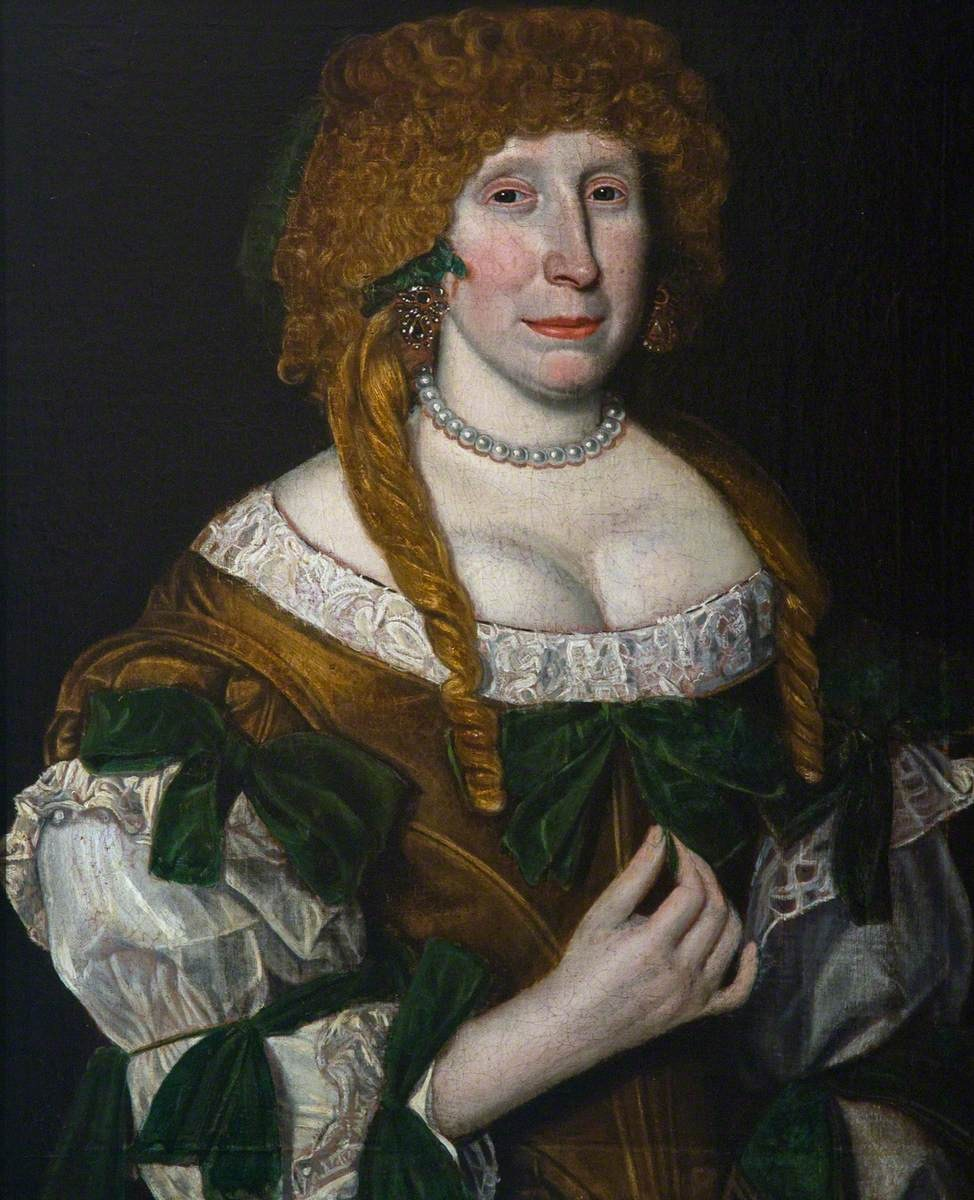
Portrait of his daughter-in-law, Margaret Erskine, c. 1700

He married twice, firstly to Magdalen Haliburton (c. 1580–1650), daughter of Sir James Haliburton. With his first wife he had six children:

- David Carnegie, 2nd Earl of Northesk (c. 1627–1679), who married Lady Jean Maule, daughter of Patrick Maule, 1st Earl of Panmure, in 1637.
- Hon. John Carnegie, who married Margaret Erskine, daughter of Sir Alexander Erskine, 11th Laird of Dun.
- Lady Anna Carnegie, who married Patrick Wood, son of Sir Henry Wood of Bonnington.
- Lady Marjorie Carnegie, who married James Scott, son of Sir John Scott of Scotstarvit. After his death, she married John Preston of Aldrie.
- Lady Jean Carnegie, who married Alexander Lindsay, son of the 2nd Lord Spynie. After his death, she married John Lindsay of Edzell.
- Lady Magdalene Carnegie, who married William Graham of Claverhouse.

After the death of his first wife, he married secondly to Margery Maule, daughter of Andrew Maule, on 29 April 1652.

Lord Northesk died on 8 January 1667. and was succeeded by his eldest son, David.

== Notes ==
Peerage of Scotland
New creation	Earl of Northesk; 1662–1667	Succeeded by David Carnegie
