= David Carnegie, 10th Earl of Northesk =

Scottish peer (1865–1921)

Arms 10th to 14th Earls of Northesk

David John Carnegie, 10th Earl of Northesk (1865 – 5 December 1921), a Scottish representative peer

== Early life ==
Carnegie was born on 1 December 1865. He was the eldest son of Lt.-Col. George Carnegie, 9th Earl of Northesk and Elizabeth Georgina Frances Elliot. His elder sister, Helen Alice Carnegie, married barrister Sir Francis Lacey, and his younger brothers were Lt.-Col. Hon. Douglas George Carnegie, MP, and Lt. Ian Ludovic Andrew Carnegie.

== Career ==
Lord Northesk served as aide-de-camp to the Governor of Victoria from 1889 to 1891 and again from 1895 to 1895. He also served as a Conservative Representative Peer for Scotland from 5 October 1900 until his death on 5 December 1921.

== Personal life ==
He married Elizabeth Boyle Hallowes, eldest daughter of Maj.-Gen. George Skene Hallowes, on 3 February 1894 and had two children:

- David Ludovic George Hopetoun Carnegie, 11th Earl of Northesk (1901–1963), who married Jessica Ruth (née Brown) Reinhard, a former Ziegfeld Follies dancer, in Chicago in 1923. They divorced in 1928 and he married Elizabeth "Betty" Vlasto, a daughter of Anthony Augustus Vlasto of Binfield Park and a cousin of the well-known tennis player Julie Vlasto, in 1929.
- Katharine Jane Elizabeth Carnegie (1904–1949), who married Lt.-Col. William Bridgeman Lambert Manley. After their divorce, she married Brig. Edward Leathley Armitage.

Lord Northesk died on 5 December 1921 at age 56 and was succeeded in the earldom by his only son, David. As his son died without male issue in 1963, the earldom passed to the 10th Earl's nephew, John Douglas Carnegie.

Peerage of Scotland
Preceded by George Carnegie	Earl of Northesk; 1891–1921	Succeeded by David Carnegie
