= David Wemyss, 4th Earl of Wemyss =

Scottish earl

The Right Honourable The Earl of Wemyss

Lord High Admiral of Scotland
- In office 1706–1714
- Preceded by: Duke of Montrose
- Succeeded by: Earl of Rothes

Personal details
- Born: 29 April 1678
- Died: 15 March 1720 (aged 41)
- Spouses: Lady Anne Douglas (m. 1697; died 1700) Mary Robinson (m. 1709; died 1712) Elizabeth St Clair (m. 1716)
- Parent(s): James Wemyss, Lord Burntisland; Margaret Wemyss, 3rd Countess of Wemyss

David Wemyss, 4th Earl of Wemyss (29 April 1678 – 15 March 1720), was a Scottish peer and Member of Parliament who served as Lord High Admiral of Scotland from 1706 to 1714.

== Early life ==
David Wemyss was born on 29 April 1678, the son of James Wemyss, Lord Burntisland (c. 1657–1682) and Margaret Wemyss, 3rd Countess of Wemyss (1659–1705). His elder sister was Lady Anne Wemyss (d. 1702), who married David Melville, 3rd Earl of Leven, and his younger sister was Lady Margaret Wemyss, who married David Carnegie, 4th Earl of Northesk.

== Career ==
He succeeded to the Wemyss title on the death of his mother in March 1705. Lord Wemyss entered parliament as a peer on 28 June 1705, and was the same year sworn of the privy council. He was one of the commissioners for the treaty of Union with England. In 1706, he was appointed High Admiral of Scotland, and this office having been abolished at the Union, he was then constituted Vice Admiral of Scotland.

The Earl of Wemyss was one of four non-medicals who was granted an Honorary Fellowship in the first 25 years of the Royal College of Physician's life.

== Personal life ==
In his 41 years Earl Wemyss married three times. The first was on 13 August 1697, to Lady Anne Douglas (d. 23 February 1700), the only daughter of William Douglas, 1st Duke of Queensberry. Together, they had two sons and one daughter:

- The Hon. David Wemyss, Lord Elcho (d. 1715)
- The Hon. James Wemyss (1699–1756), who became 5th Earl of Wemyss, who married Janet Charteris, heiress of Col. Francis Charteris
- Lady Williamina Wemyss (1704-1784), who moved to Chester County, Pennsylvania and married Judge William Moore of "Moore Hall"

His second marriage was on 5 January 1709, at St Martin-in-the-Fields, London to Mary Robinson (d. 1711/12), daughter of Sir John Robinson. They had one daughter:

- Lady Margaret Wemyss, who married James Stuart, 8th Earl of Moray (1708–1767)

His third marriage as in July 1716, to Elizabeth St. Clair (d. 1721), the daughter of Henry, Lord Sinclair. Together, they had one daughter:

- Lady Elisabeth Wemyss, who married William Sutherland, 17th Earl of Sutherland (1708–1750)

The Earl of Wemyss died on 15 March 1720.

Peerage of Scotland
Preceded by Margaret Wemyss	Earl of Wemyss; 1705–1720	Succeeded by James Wemyss
Military offices
Preceded by James Graham	Lord High Admiral of Scotland; 1706–1714	Succeeded by John Hamilton-Leslie
