= George Carnegie, 6th Earl of Northesk =

Royal Navy officer (1716–1792)

Admiral The Right Honourable The Earl of Northesk
- Arms of the 1st to 6th and 15th Earls of Northesk
- Born: 2 August 1716; Ethie Castle, Angus, Scotland
- Died: 22 January 1792, age 76; Ethie Castle, Angus, Scotland
- Military career
- Allegiance: Great Britain
- Branch: Royal Navy
- Service years: 1737–1792
- Rank: Admiral of the White
- Commands: HMS Bideford; HMS Looe; HMS Preston; HMS Orford
- Conflicts: War of the Austrian Succession; First Carnatic War; Action of 6 July 1746

Admiral of the White George Carnegie, 6th Earl of Northesk (2 August 1716 – 22 January 1792) was a Royal Navy officer. He was the son of David Carnegie, 4th Earl of Northesk and Lady Margaret Wemyss and was born on 2 August 1716. A career naval officer, he fought in the War of the Austrian Succession and the First Carnatic War, where in the East Indies he participated in the action of 6 July 1746. His service was curtailed by a series of debilitating illnesses and he never served at sea again after being promoted to Rear-Admiral of the Blue in 1756. He died on 20 January 1792 at age 75.

== Early life ==
George Carnegie was born on 2 August 1716 as the second son of David Carnegie, 4th Earl of Northesk and his wife Margaret, the daughter of James Wemyss, Lord Burntisland and Margaret Wemyss, 3rd Countess of Wemyss.

== Naval career ==
Carnegie became a lieutenant in the Royal Navy on 15 March 1737. His first appointment was as third lieutenant to his good friend Captain Curtis Barnett in the ship of the line HMS Dragon, in the Mediterranean Fleet of Rear-Admiral Nicholas Haddock. Carnegie transferred to the ship of the line HMS Windsor on 29 April but in August 1738 was taken from Windsor with a debilitating illness while off Minorca, at one point coming so close to death that his funeral arrangements were made. Having recovered from his illness he was appointed as fourth lieutenant of the ship of the line HMS Marlborough on 2 February 1740 and transferred on 7 May to be second lieutenant of the ship of the line HMS Edinburgh.

On 23 June 1741 Carnegie's elder brother David Carnegie, 5th Earl of Northesk died, leaving him to succeed as Earl of Northesk. On 25 August of the same year Carnegie was promoted to post captain and given command of the frigate HMS Bideford in which he served in the Western Approaches for the winter of 1741-42. (Note: Bideford also spelt Biddeford.) In January 1742 Carnegie left Bideford and was appointed to the command of the fifth rate HMS Looe in March. (Note: Looe also spelt Loo.) In Looe Carnegie was stationed in the Bay of Biscay; in June he chased a small privateer into Pontevedra where he was forced to call off the chase as the privateer entered the river, instead raiding the town and taking four guns from its battery. Carnegie then put to sea again and on 7 July joined with the frigate HMS Deal Castle upon learning that a number of enemy ships were taking shelter in Vigo. The two warships anchored outside the town and sent their boats in to the harbour where they captured four ships, of which they burned two, while under considerable fire from the enemy ships and shore.

On 19 July Carnegie learned that the privateer he had chased at Pontevedra was still there in the river and so he armed one of the ships captured at Vigo and sent it in chase up the river. The ship failed to capture the privateer but did run ashore another vessel and destroy a town which privateers had been using as a base of operations. Carnegie returned to England in September 1742 and was immediately appointed to command the recently rebuilt ship of the line HMS Preston in the English Channel fleet of Admiral of the Fleet Sir John Norris. In April 1744 he was still serving as such and helping to protect convoys sailing from Lisbon.

Carnegie and Preston sailed to the East Indies Station on 5 May in the squadron of its first commander-in-chief, and Carnegie's friend, Commodore Barnett. The ships arrived at Porto Praya on 26 May. After sailing to and then leaving Madagascar the squadron split in two with Carnegie and Preston going with Commodore Barnett and the ship of the line HMS Deptford. The two ships disguised themselves as Dutch vessels and sailed through the Sunda Strait to Banca where on 25 January 1745 they found three French ships at anchor. They approached the ships and found them to be heavily armed merchant ships from China and managed to come alongside them before the French realised the deception and that they were enemies. Carnegie was ordered to board one of the ships while Barnett boarded another and after a fight of two hours the three French ships were captured. The cargoes of the merchants were valued at over £300,000 and were sent in to Batavia.

Throughout 1745 Carnegie continued in Preston to protect British commerce in the East Indies. In October he was detached from Barnett's squadron with Preston and the frigate HMS Lively to cruise near the trade routes of the Ganges. Here they were very successful, capturing three heavily laden merchant ships. Carnegie continued in the East Indies after the death of Commodore Barnett on 29 April 1746, his replacement being Commodore Edward Peyton under whom Carnegie fought in the inconclusive action of 6 July 1746. In late 1747 Carnegie returned to England having suffered through 1746 and 1747 with an illness which often confined him to bed, and gave up command of Preston. Carnegie arrived at Bath on 28 November to recuperate from his illness. As part of this he went travelling in Europe with his father-in-law Alexander Melville, 5th Earl of Leven in August 1749.

In March 1755 he was given command of the ship of the line HMS Orford to serve in Vice-Admiral of the White Sir Edward Hawke's Western Squadron as the Seven Years' War approached, but by May he had resigned his command due to ill health once again. He would spend considerable portions of the rest of his life in Bath for the sake of his health. Carnegie was promoted to Rear-Admiral of the Blue on 4 June 1756. He never again accepted a command at sea but by seniority was promoted to Rear-Admiral of the White on 13 July 1758, Vice-Admiral of the Blue on 14 February 1759, Vice-Admiral of the White on 21 October 1762, Admiral of the Blue on 18 October 1770 and Admiral of the White on 29 January 1772.

== Death ==
Carnegie died on 22 January 1792 at his seat Ethie Castle in Angus, Scotland, his titles passing down to his eldest surviving son. At the time of his death he was the third most senior officer in the Royal Navy.

== Family ==
He married his maternal first cousin once removed, Lady Anne Leslie (1730-1779), daughter of the 5th Earl of Leven and Elizabeth Monypenny, on 30 April 1748 and had six children:

- Lady Mary Anne Carnegie (b.1764 d. 2 June 1798) married Rev John Kemp of Edinburgh in 1797
- David Carnegie, Lord Rosehill (5 April 1749 – 19 February 1788)
- Lady Elizabeth Carnegie (1751 – 19 August 1793) married James Hope-Johnstone, 3rd Earl of Hopetoun. Their daughter Lady Elizabeth (b. 16 Oct 1768, d. 17 Sept 1801) married Rev John Kemp of Edinburgh 29 Aug 1799
- Admiral William Carnegie, 7th Earl of Northesk (10 April 1756 – 28 May 1831)
- Lieutenant Colonel George Carnegie (21 August 1773 – 1839)
- Margaret Carnegie (1779 – 15 March 1793)

== Notes and citations ==
=== Citations ===
Peerage of Scotland
Preceded by David Carnegie	Earl of Northesk; 1741–1792	Succeeded by William Carnegie
