= Earl of Northesk =

Title in the Peerage of Scotland

Earldom of Northesk
- Arms: Quarterly: 1st & 4th, Or, an Eagle displayed Azure, armed, beaked and membered Sable, and charged on the breast with a Naval Crown Or (Carneigie); 2nd & 3rd, Argent, a Pale Gules (Earldom of Northesk). Crests: 1st, The stern of a French Man-of-War with three Lanthorns, all proper, inflamed Gules, on a Scroll the word TRAFALGAR; 2nd, Issuant from a Naval Crown Or, a Demi-Leopard proper, holding a Rose Argent, barbed and seeded proper, on a Scroll the words BRITANNIA VICTRIX. Supporters: on either side a Leopard reguardant proper, gorged with Roses Argent, barbed and seeded Vert, each supporting a Banner of St George proper.
- Creation date: 1 November 1647
- Creation: First
- Created by: Charles I
- Peerage: Peerage of Scotland
- First holder: John Carnegie
- Present holder: Patrick Carnegy, 15th Earl
- Heir presumptive: Hon. Colin Carnegy
- Remainder to: the 1st Earl’s heirs male forever
- Subsidiary titles: Lord Rosehill and Inglismaldie
- Status: Extant
- Former seat: Ethie Castle
- Motto: TACHÉ SANS TACHÉ (Spot without stain)

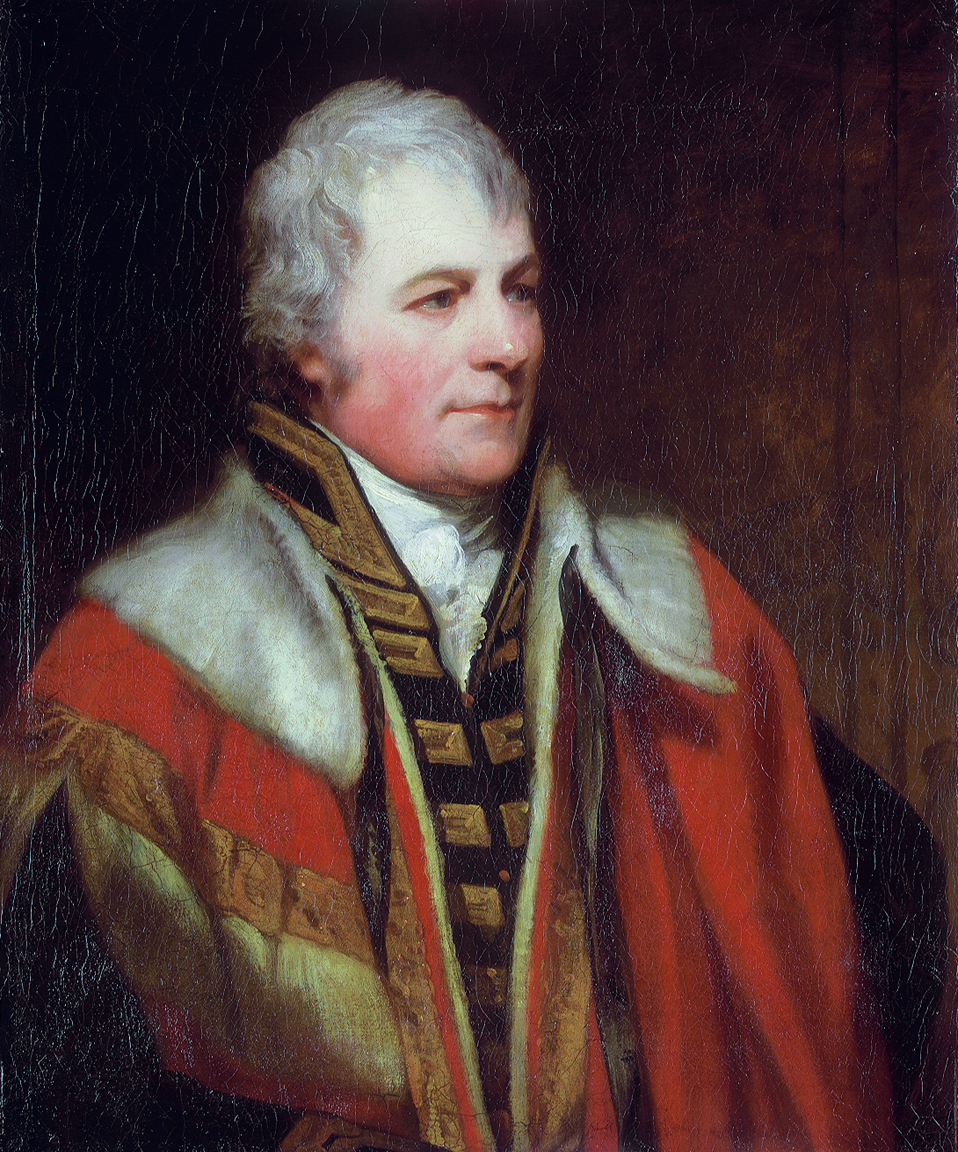
William Carnegie, 7th Earl of Northesk

Earl of Northesk is a title in the Peerage of Scotland. It was created in 1662 for John Carnegie, who notably served as Sheriff of Forfarshire. He was given the subsidiary title of Lord Rosehill and Eglismauldie (or Inglismaldie) at the same time. Carnegie had already been created Earl of Ethie and Lord Lour in 1647 but relinquished those titles in exchange for the 1662 creations. For the purposes of precedence and seniority, the earldom of Northesk is treated as having been created in 1647, the date of the creation of the earldom of Ethie.

Lord Northesk's great-grandson, the fourth Earl, sat in the House of Lords as a Scottish representative peer from 1708 to 1715. His younger son, the sixth Earl, was an admiral in the Royal Navy. He was succeeded by his son, the seventh Earl. He was also an admiral in the navy and was third in command at the Battle of Trafalgar. Lord Northesk was also a Scottish representative peer between 1796 and 1807 and 1830 and 1831. His grandson, the ninth Earl, was a Scottish representative peer from 1885 to 1891. He was succeeded by his son, the tenth Earl, who served as a Scottish representative peer from 1900 to 1921. His son, the eleventh Earl, was a Scottish representative peer from 1959 to 1963, when all Scottish peers were given an automatic seat in the House of Lords.

The eleventh Earl was succeeded by his first cousin, the twelfth Earl. He was the son of the Hon. Douglas Carnegie, second son of the ninth Earl. The fourteenth Earl was one of the ninety elected hereditary peers that were allowed to remain in the House of Lords after the passing of the House of Lords Act 1999, and sat on the Conservative benches. When he died without surviving male issue in 2010, the line of the third Earl failed, and the titles passed to his eighth cousin once removed, the fifteenth Earl, who is a writer and a descendant of the second Earl.

David Carnegie, 1st Earl of Southesk, was the elder brother of the first Earl. Another member of the Carnegie/Carnegy family was Elizabeth Carnegy, Baroness Carnegy of Lour. She was a descendant of the Hon. Patrick Carnegie of Lour, third son of the second Earl of Northesk, and a great-great-granddaughter of Major-General Alexander Carnegie (1793–1862) through his first son, making her a third cousin of the fifteenth Earl.

The earldom is named after the River North Esk in Angus. The family seat was Ethie Castle, near Arbroath, Scotland.

== Earl of Northesk (1647/1662) ==
- John Carnegie, 1st Earl of Northesk (c. 1580 – 1667)
- David Carnegie, 2nd Earl of Northesk (b. 1627 – 1679)
- David Carnegie, 3rd Earl of Northesk (1643–1688)
- David Carnegie, 4th Earl of Northesk (1675–1729)
- David Carnegie, 5th Earl of Northesk (1701–1741)
- George Carnegie, 6th Earl of Northesk (1716–1792)
  - David Carnegie, Lord Rosehill (1749–1788)
- William Carnegie, 7th Earl of Northesk (1756–1831)
  - George Carnegie, Lord Rosehill (1791–1807)
- William Hopetoun Carnegie, 8th Earl of Northesk (1794–1878)
- George John Carnegie, 9th Earl of Northesk (1843–1891)
- David John Carnegie, 10th Earl of Northesk (1865–1921)
- David Ludovic George Hopetoun Carnegie, 11th Earl of Northesk (1901–1963)
- John Douglas Carnegie, 12th Earl of Northesk (1895–1975)
- Robert Andrew Carnegie, 13th Earl of Northesk (1926–1994)
- David John MacRae Carnegie, 14th Earl of Northesk (1954–2010)
  - Alexander Carnegie, Lord Rosehill (1980–2001)
- Patrick Charles Carnegy, 15th Earl of Northesk (born 1940)

The heir presumptive is the present holder's brother, Colin David Carnegy (born 1942).
The heir presumptive's heir apparent is his son, Charles Alexander Carnegy (born 1975).
The heir presumptive's heir apparent's heir apparent is Patrick James Frederick Alexander Carnegy (born 2014).

== Family tree ==
Family tree: Earls of Fife, Dukes of Fife, Earls of Southesk and Earls of Northesk

(Mormaers) Earls of Fife (Scot)
Donnchad (Duncan) I 1113–1154; Earl of Fife
Donnchad (Duncan/Dunecan) II d. 1204; Earl of Fife
Máel Coluim (Maol Choluim, Malcolm) I 1204–1228; Earl of Fife	Donnchadh
Máel Coluim (Malcolm) II c. Early 13th century–1266 Earl of Fife
Colban c. 1247–1253–1270/1272; Earl of Fife
Donnchadh (Duncan) III; 1270/1272–1288; Earl of Fife
Robert II of Scotland; 1316–1390; King of Scotland	Donnchadh (Duncan) IV; 1289–1353; Earl of Fife
Robert III of Scotland c. 1337–1406; King of Scotland	m1. Walter Stewart c. 1338–1362; Earl of Fife jure uxoris	Isabella MacDuff c. 1320–1389; Countess of Fife suo jure	Robert Stewart c. 1340–1420; Duke of Albany, Earl of Fife, Earl of Menteith, Earl of Buchan, Earl of Atholl	m2. Thomas Bisset d. 1366; Earl of Fife jure uxoris	m3. John Dunbar d. before 1371; Earl of Fife jure uxoris
Murdoch Stewart; 1362–1425; Earl of Fife; Duke of Albany
David Carnegie of Colluthie; 1559–1598
Earl of Southesk, 1633
David Carnegie; 1575–1658; 1st Earl of Southesk
Earl of Northesk, 1662
John Carnegie; 1611–1667; 1st Earl of Northesk
James Carnegie before 1583–1669; 2nd Earl of Southesk	Alexander Carnegie d. 1681/82	David Carnegie d. 1669; 2nd Earl of Northesk
Robert Carnegie before 1649–1688; 3rd Earl of Southesk	David Carnegie d. 1708; 1st Baronet	David Carnegie; 1643–1688; 3rd Earl of Northesk	Patrick Carnegie of Lour after 1643–1743
Charles Carnegie; 1661–1699; 4th Earl of Southesk	James Carnegie; 1673–1729; 2nd Baronet	David Carnegie; 1675–1729; 4th Earl of Northesk	Patrick Carnegie of Lour; 1684–1729
Viscount Macduff and Baron Braco, 1735; Earl Fife, 1759
William Duff; 1697–1763; 1st Earl Fife, etc.	James Carnegie; 1692–1730; 5th Earl of Southesk	James Carnegie; 1716–1765 de jure 6th Earl of Southesk	David Carnegie; 1701–1741; 5th Earl of Northesk	George Carnegie; 1716–1792; 6th Earl of Northesk	Patrick Carnegie of Lour; 1720–1799
Earldom of Southesk attainted, 1716
Baron Fife (GB), 1790
James Duff; 1729–1809; 2nd Earl Fife, etc., Baron Fife (GB)	Alexander Duff; 1731–1811; 3rd Earl Fife, etc.	David Carnegie; 1753–1805 de jure 7th Earl of Southesk	William Carnegie; 1756–1831; 7th Earl of Northesk	Patrick Carnegie of Lour; 1757–1819
Baron Fife (GB) extinct, 1809
Baron Fife (UK), 1827
James Duff; 1776–1857; 4th Earl Fife, etc., Baron Fife (UK)	Alexander Duff; 1777–1851	James Carnegie; 1799–1849 de jure 8th Earl of Southesk	William Hopetoun Carnegie; 1794–1878; 8th Earl of Northesk	Alexander Carnegie; 1793–1862
Baron Fife (UK) extinct, 1809
Baron Skene, 1857	Southesk attainder reversed, 1855
Queen Victoria; 1819–1901	James Duff; 1814–1879; 5th Earl Fife, etc., 1st Baron Skene	James Carnegie; 1827–1905; 9th Earl of Southesk	Alexander Carnegie; 1829–1900
King Edward VII; 1841–1910	Prince Arthur; 1850–1942; Duke of Connaught and Strathearn	George John Carnegie; 1843–1891; 9th Earl of Northesk
Earl of Fife, 1885; Duke of Fife (Scotland), 1889; Duke of Fife (UK), Marquess of Macduff, and Earl of Macduff, 1900
King George V 1865–1936	Louise, Princess Royal; 1867–1931; Duchess of Fife	Alexander William George Duff; 1849–1912; 1st Duke of Fife (Scot) and Earl of Fife, 1st Duke of Fife (UK) and Earl of Macduff, Marquess of Macduff; 6th Earl Fife, etc., 2nd Baron Skene	Charles Noel Carnegie; 1854–1941; 10th Earl of Southesk	David John Carnegie; 1865–1921; 10th Earl of Northesk	Douglas George Carnegie; 1870–1937	Charles Carnegie; 1864–1928
Dukedom of Fife (Scot), Marquess of Macduff, Earldom Fife (1759), Viscountcy of Macduff, and Baronies of Braco and Skene extinct, 1912
Prince Arthur of Connaught; 1883–1938	Princess Alexandra; 1891–1959; 2nd Duchess of Fife (UK), etc. suo jure	Maud Carnegie; 1893–1945; Countess of Southesk	Charles Alexander Bannerman Carnegie; 1893–1992; 11th Earl of Southesk	David Ludovic George Hopetoun Carnegie; 1901–1963; 11th Earl of Northesk	John Douglas Carnegie; 1895–1975; 12th Earl of Northesk	Patrick Carnegy; 1893–1969
Prince Alastair Arthur (later Alistair Windsor); 1914–1943; Duke of Connaught and Strathearn	James George Alexander Bannerman Carnegie; 1929–2015; 3rd Duke of Fife, etc., 12th Earl of Southesk	Robert Andrew Carnegie; 1926–1994; 13th Earl of Northesk	Patrick Charles Carnegy b. 1940; 15th Earl of Northesk	Colin Carnegy b. 1942
Heir presumptive to the Earldom of Northesk
David Charles Carnegie b. 1961; 4th Duke of Fife, etc., 13th Earl of Southesk	David John MacRae Carnegie; 1954–2010; 14th Earl of Northesk
Charles Carnegie b. 1989 styled Earl of Southesk	George Carnegie b. 1991	Hugh Carnegie b. 1993
Heir apparent

=== Male-line family tree ===
Male-line family tree, Earls of Northesk

John Carnegie; 1st Earl of Northesk c. 1580 – 1667
David Carnegie; 2nd Earl of Northesk b. 1627 – 1679
David Carnegie; 3rd Earl of Northesk; 1643–1688	James Carnegie d. 1707	Patrick Carnegie of Lour a. 1643 – 1723
David Carnegie; 4th Earl of Northesk; 1675–1729	Unknown son a. 1675 – ?	Charles Carnegie d. 1712	James Carnegie of Finhaven d. 1765	Patrick Carnegie of Lour; 1684–1729
David Carnegie; 5th Earl of Northesk; 1701–1741	James Carnegie; 1707–?	George Carnegie; 6th Earl of Northesk; 1716–1792	James Carnegie d. 1777	Patrick Carnegie of Lour; 1720–1799
David Carnegie; Lord Rosehill; 1749–1788	William Carnegie; 7th Earl of Northesk; 1756–1831	Lt Col. George Carnegie; 1773–1839	Patrick Carnegie of Lour; 1757–1819
George Carnegie; Lord Rosehill; 1791–1807	William Carnegie; 8th Earl of Northesk; 1794–1878	John Carnegie; 1807–1892	Adm. Swynfen Carnegie; 1813–1879	George Carnegie; 1806–1837	Patrick Watson-Carnegy of Lour; 1791–1838	Maj. Gen. Alexander Carnegie; 1793–1862
George Carnegie; 9th Earl of Northesk; 1843–1891	Patrick Watson-Carnegy of Lour; 1836–1914	James Watson-Carnegy of Lour; 1838–1855	Patrick Carnegie; 1825–1886	Gen. Alexander Carnegie; 1829–1900
David Carnegie; 10th Earl of Northesk; 1865–1921	Lt Col. Douglas Carnegie; 1870–1937	Ian Carnegie; 1881–1909	Patrick Carnegie; 1855–1885	Arthur Carnegie; 1857–1885	Robert Carnegie; 1860–1887	Lt Col. Charles Carnegie; 1864–1928
David Carnegie; 11th Earl of Northesk; 1901–1963	John Carnegie; 12th Earl of Northesk; 1895–1975	David Carnegie; 1897–1917	Rev. Canon; Patrick Carnegy; 1893–1969
David Carnegie; 1922–1942	Robert Carnegie; 13th Earl of Northesk; 1926–1994
Ian Carnegie; 1950–1951	David Carnegie; 14th Earl of Northesk; 1954–2010	Patrick Carnegy; 15th Earl of Northesk b. 1940	Colin Carnegy b. 1942
Heir presumptive to the Earldom of Northesk
Alexander Carnegie; Lord Rosehill; 1980–2001	Charles Alexander Carnegy b. 1975

== See also ==
- Earl of Southesk
- Carnegie (disambiguation)
