= HMS Saint Eustatius =

Dutch frigate captured by the Royal Navy in 1781

History

Dutch Republic
- Name: De Graaf
- Commissioned: c.1781
- Fate: Captured 4 February 1781

Great Britain
- Name: HMS Saint Eustatius
- Namesake: Sint Eustatius
- Commissioned: 14 February 1781
- Fate: Sold at Antigua 1783

General characteristics
- Class & type: Sixth rate frigate
- Tons burthen: 3634/94 (bm)
- Length: 104 ft (31.7 m) (gundeck); 90 ft 3 in (28 m) (keel)
- Beam: 27 ft 6 in (8 m)
- Depth of hold: 10 ft 3 in (3.1 m)
- Propulsion: Sails
- Complement: 160
- Armament: 20 × 9-pounder guns

HMS Saint Eustatius, also known as HMS Eustatia, was a 20-gun sixth rate frigate originally built by the Dutch Republic to serve in the Leeward Islands under the name de Graaf. She was taken by the British at the capture of Sint Eustatius in February 1781 and commissioned into the Royal Navy. She was sold in 1783.

== Construction and design ==
de Graaf was a Dutch 20-gun sixth rate frigate, constructed some time before 1781 to the following dimensions: 104 feet (31.7 m) along the gun deck, 90 feet 3 inches (27.5 m) at the keel, with a beam of 27 feet 6 inches (8.4 m) and a depth in the hold of 10 feet 3 inches (3.1 m). She measured 363 4/94 tons burthen by calculation, but was locally, and incorrectly, reported to be of 514 tons burthen. Her armament was made up entirely of 9-pounder long guns and she had a crew of 160 men.

== Capture and British service ==
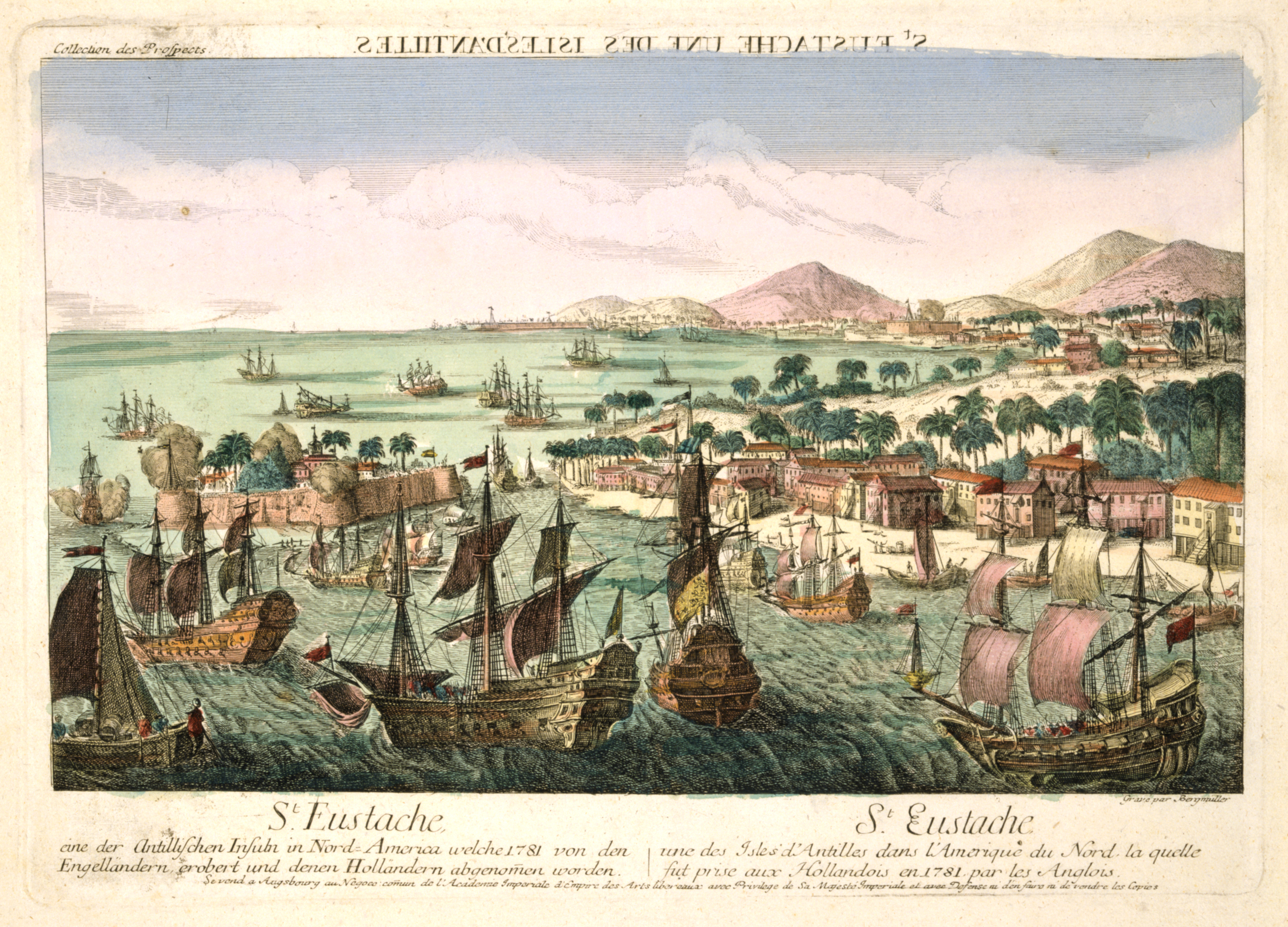
The capture of Sint Eustatius, February 1781

In February 1781, during the Fourth Anglo-Dutch War, de Graaf was serving at the island of Sint Eustatius. On 4 February she was captured, along with the island as a whole, by an invasion force commanded by Admiral George Rodney. She was taken into service by the Royal Navy and renamed Saint Eustatius, after the island at which she was captured. (Note: Also noted as being called Eustatia.) She was commissioned on 14 February by Captain George Bowen on the Leeward Islands Station, but later on in the same year Bowen was replaced in command by Captain Andrew Sutherland. In January 1782 Captain Lord Cranstoun took command of Saint Eustatius, and then on 30 April he was replaced in turn by the newly promoted Captain William Carnegie, who then left the ship on 13 January 1783.

The cycle of captains for the ship continued, with Captain Richard Grindall assuming command in March, and Captain William Smith replacing him only one month later. Having had six captains in only two years of service, Smith was Saint Eustatius's last; she was sold at Antigua later in 1783.
