= HMS Cranstoun =

Frigate of the Royal Navy

History

United Kingdom
- Name: HMS Cranstoun
- Builder: Bethlehem Hingham Shipyard
- Laid down: 9 June 1943
- Launched: 28 August 1943
- Commissioned: 13 November 1943
- Decommissioned: 3 December 1945
- Stricken: 7 February 1946
- Honours and awards: English Channel; North Foreland
- Fate: Sold for scrapping, 20 November 1947

General characteristics
- Class & type: Captain-class frigate
- Displacement: 1,400 long tons (1,422 t) standard; 1,740 long tons (1,768 t) full
- Length: 306 ft (93 m) o/a; 300 ft (91 m) w/l
- Beam: 36 ft 9 in (11.20 m)
- Draught: 9 ft (2.7 m)
- Propulsion: 2 × Foster Wheeler Express "D"-type water-tube boilers; GE 13,500 shp (10,067 kW) steam turbines and generators (9,200 kW); Electric motors 12,000 shp (8,948 kW); 2 shafts
- Speed: 24 knots (44 km/h; 28 mph)
- Range: 5,500 nmi (10,200 km) at 15 kn (28 km/h; 17 mph)
- Complement: 186
- Electronic warfare & decoys: SA & SL type radars; Type 144 series Asdic; MF Direction Finding antenna; HF Direction Finding Type FH 4 antenna
- Armament: 3 × 3 in (76 mm) /50 Mk.22 guns; 1 × twin Bofors 40 mm mount Mk.I; 7–16 × 20 mm Oerlikon guns; Mark 10 Hedgehog anti-submarine mortar; Depth charges; QF 2-pounder naval gun

Service record
- Commanders: Lt. Eric W. Rainey, RN; (23 November 1943 – 23 June 1945); A/Lt.Cdr. Alfred S. Miller, DSC, RNZNVR; (23 June–September 1945); A/Lt.Cdr. John P. Kilbee, RNR; (September–October 1945)
- Victories: U-1063 (15 April 1945)

HMS Cranstoun (K511) was a Captain-class frigate of the British Royal Navy that served in the last two years of World War II. The ship was laid down as a Buckley-class destroyer escort at the Bethlehem-Hingham Shipyard at Hingham, Massachusetts on 9 June 1943, with the hull number DE-82, and launched on 28 August 1943. The ship was transferred to the UK under Lend-Lease on 13 November 1943, and named after Captain James Cranstoun, an officer who served in the American Revolutionary and French Revolutionary Wars.

== Service history ==
Cranstoun served as a convoy escort, and was attached to the Nore Command, and then the 19th Escort Group.

At 21:14 on the evening of 15 April 1945 Cranstoun and Loch Killin, while part of the escort to Convoy TBC 128, detected the U-1063 in Bigbury Bay, Devon. The two ships mounted a coordinated attack, with Loch Killin using her Squid anti-submarine mortar three times and Cranstoun her Hedgehog mortar once, to force the U-boat to the surface. Burges then also joined the attack, as the U-boat was illuminated by the ship's searchlights and fired on with 20 mm and 40 mm guns. U-1063 attempted to escape, but Loch Killin attacked with depth charges and sank her. Only 17 of the crew survived.

Cranstoun was returned to the U.S. Navy on 3 December 1945, struck from the Navy List on 7 February 1946, and sold for scrapping on 20 November 1947.
