= William Carnegie, 7th Earl of Northesk =

Royal Navy officer (1756–1831)

Admiral The Right Honourable The Earl of Northesk GCB
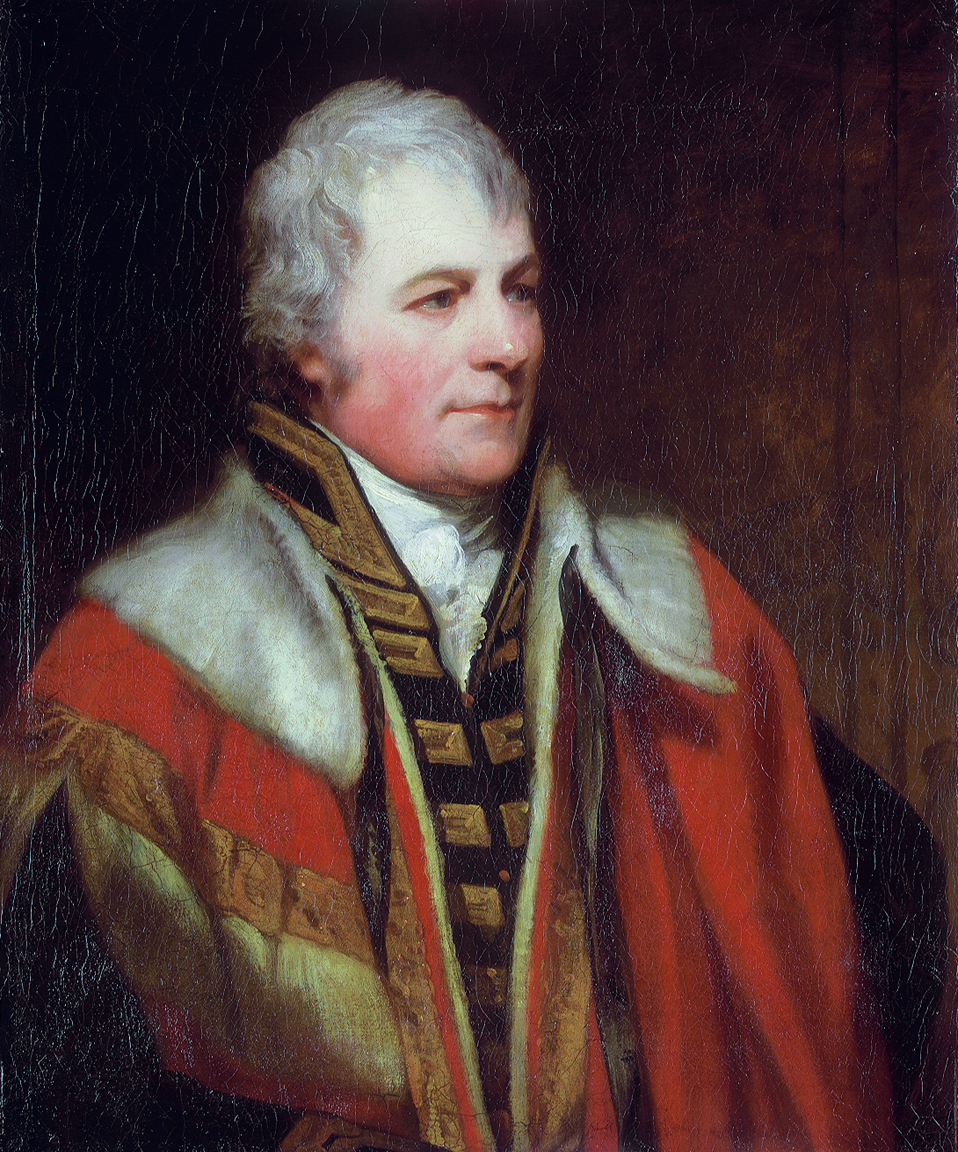
- Portrait by Thomas Phillips, 1805
- Born: 10 April 1756; Hampshire, England
- Died: 28 May 1831 (aged 75); Westminster, England
- Military career
- Allegiance: Great Britain; United Kingdom
- Branch: Royal Navy
- Service years: 1771–1831
- Rank: Admiral
- Commands: HMS Blast; HMS Saint Eustatius; HMS Enterprise; HMS Heroine; HMS Beaulieu; HMS Andromeda; HMS Monmouth; HMS Prince; HMS Britannia; Plymouth Command
- Conflicts: American Revolutionary War; Action of 8 January 1780; Battle of Cape St. Vincent; Relief of Gibraltar; Battle of Martinique; Capture of Sint Eustatius; French Revolutionary War; Nore Mutiny; Napoleonic Wars; Battle of Trafalgar

Admiral William Carnegie, 7th Earl of Northesk, GCB (10 April 1756 – 28 May 1831) was a Royal Navy officer who served in the American Revolutionary War and French Revolutionary and Napoleonic Wars. While in command of HMS Monmouth he was caught in the Nore Mutiny of 1797 and was the officer selected to relay the demands of the mutineers to George III. He most notably served as third-in-command of the Mediterranean Fleet at the Battle of Trafalgar in HMS Britannia. He later became Rear-Admiral of the United Kingdom and Commander-in-Chief, Plymouth.

== Naval career ==
=== Early career ===
Carnegie was born in Hampshire on 10 April 1756 as the second son of Admiral George Carnegie, 6th Earl of Northesk and his wife Lady Anne Leslie, eldest daughter of Alexander Leslie, 5th Earl of Leven. (Note: It is also claimed that he was born at Leven Lodge, a residence of his uncle David Leslie, 6th Earl of Leven, near Edinburgh.)

Carnegie entered the Royal Navy in 1771 on board the third-rate HMS Albion. Subsequently he served on the frigate HMS Southampton in home waters, where he assisted in transporting the Queen of Denmark across the English Channel, and in the post ship HMS Squirrel, in which he sailed for Jamaica in 1774 while still a midshipman. In early 1777 he was made an acting lieutenant in HMS Nonsuch before being confirmed as a lieutenant on 7 December in HMS Apollo on the North American Station. Carnegie served on Apollo for just under two years before joining the flagship of Rear-Admiral Sir John Lockhart-Ross, the ship of the line HMS Royal George. In Royal George he joined the fleet of Admiral Sir George Rodney sent to relieve the siege of Gibraltar. On their way towards Gibraltar the fleet fought the action of 8 January 1780, where they captured a large Spanish convoy. Carnegie subsequently participated in the Battle of Cape St. Vincent on 16 January which cleared the way for the British fleet, allowing them to successfully reach Gibraltar on 25 January.

In early 1780 he joined the newly recommissioned HMS Sandwich, flagship of Rodney, sailing for the Leeward Islands Station. On 17 April Carnegie was present during the Battle of Martinique where the twenty ships of the line of Rodney fought the twenty-three ships of the line of the Comte de Guichen. While the battle itself was inconclusive, Sandwich fought alone against de Guichen's flagship Couronne and two of her consorts for an hour and a half, taking a great amount of damage. For his service during the battle Carnegie was promoted to commander by Rodney, although his rank was only confirmed on 10 September. In January 1781 Carnegie assumed as his first command the fire ship HMS Blast. In early 1782 he transferred commands to the 20-gun HMS Saint Eustatius which had been taken at the capture of Sint Eustatius, at which Carnegie was present. (Note: Kenneth Breen instead describes Saint Eustatius as a hired ship.)

=== Post-Captain ===
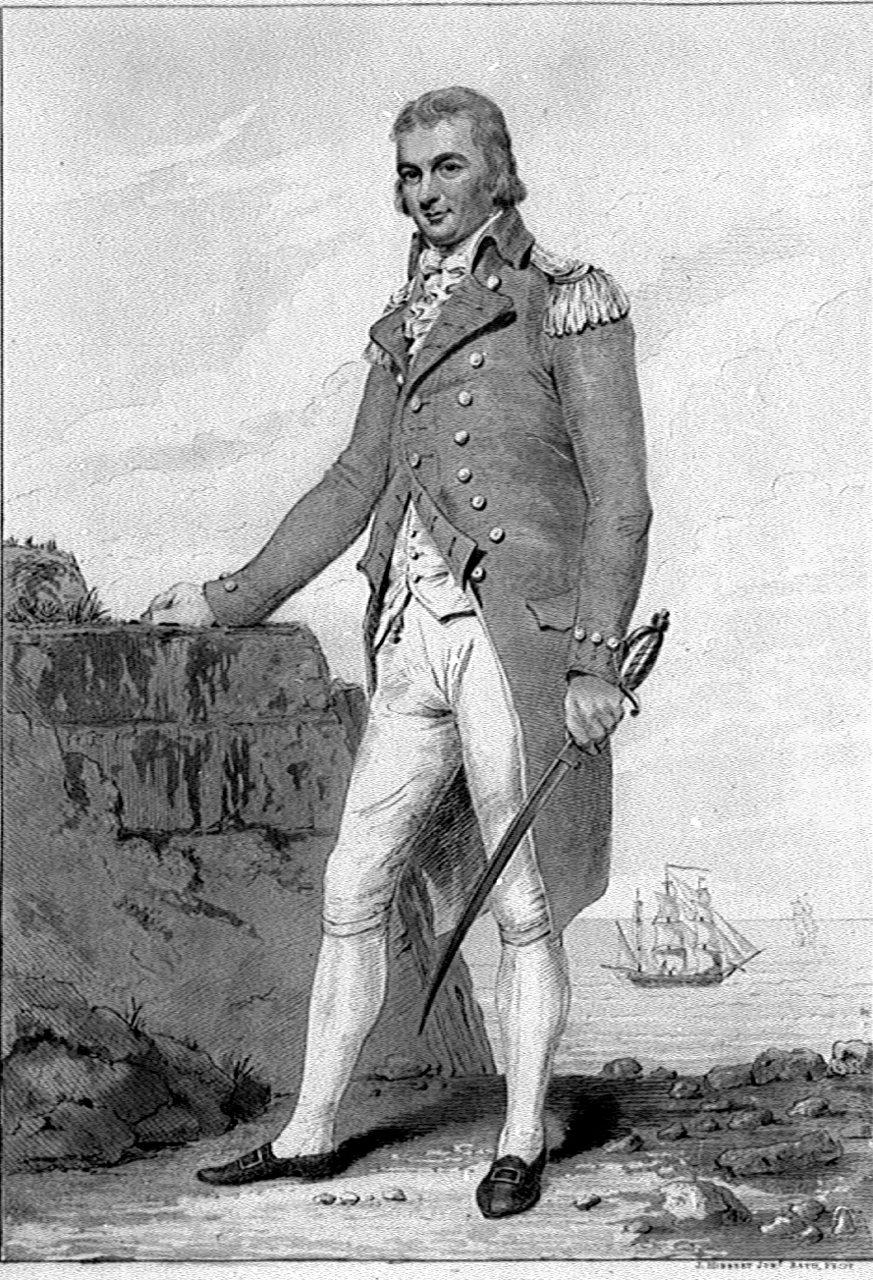
Carnegie as a post captain

On 7 April 1782 Carnegie was promoted to post captain and given command of the frigate HMS Enterprise which had newly arrived on station in the Leeward Islands from England. On 4 October Enterprise captured the American 22-gun privateer Mohawk off Cape Ann, which was taken into service as HMS Mohawk. At the end of the American Revolutionary War in 1783, Carnegie sailed Enterprise to England where he paid her off in May 1784. With the Royal Navy at peace, Carnegie was left unemployed. His elder brother David died in 1788 leaving him his father's heir and holding the courtesy title of Lord Rosehill. In 1790 he briefly took command of the frigate HMS Heroine during the Spanish Armament, relinquishing command when that threat diminished. On 22 January 1792 Carnegie's father died, leaving him to inherit as Earl of Northesk.

Carnegie continued his stint of brief frigate commands into 1793, taking command of HMS Beaulieu in January and sailing her to the Leeward Islands before returning to England later in the year in HMS Andromeda escorting a convoy. His next true command was of the brand new 64-gun third rate HMS Monmouth from September 1796, with Charles Bullen as his first lieutenant. Carnegie and Monmouth were assigned to the North Sea Fleet of Admiral Adam Duncan the same year. On 12 May 1797 many ships of the fleet including Monmouth were at the Nore when the Nore Mutiny began. Carnegie was confined to his cabin by his mutinous crew, until 6 June when he was brought before the committee of delegates that the mutineers had set up on Sandwich. Carnegie was selected by the committee to carry their terms to the king because of his reputation as a friend to seamen. While refusing to guarantee any success, Carnegie agreed to convey the terms and left the Nore for London. He took the mutineers' terms to the Admiralty from where the First Lord of the Admiralty Lord Spencer took him to the king. The demands were rejected, and a different officer returned to the mutineers with the reply.

Soon after the mutiny ended Carnegie resigned his command of Monmouth and thus missed the Battle of Camperdown. He stayed unemployed for four years. In October 1800 he was given command of the 98-gun second-rate HMS Prince in the Channel Fleet. He commanded Prince until she was paid off at the start of the Peace of Amiens in April 1802. The Peace expired in May 1803 and Carnegie was given the 100-gun first-rate HMS Britannia in June to again serve in the Channel Fleet of Admiral William Cornwallis at the blockade of Brest. Towards the end of the year Britannia was stationed near the Isle of Wight to protect against possible invasion from France.

=== Admiral ===
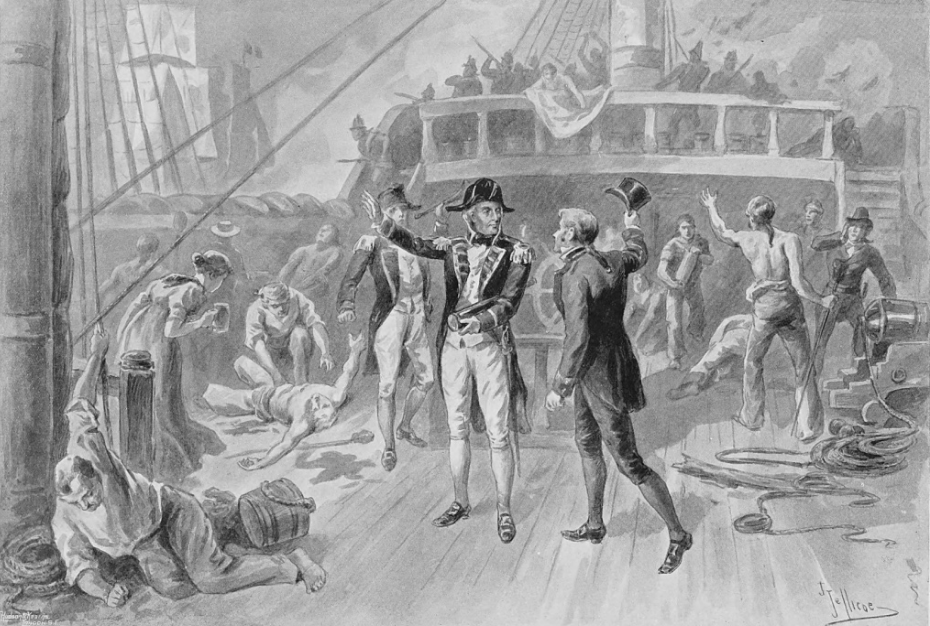
Carnegie on the deck of HMS Britannia during the Battle of Trafalgar

Carnegie was promoted to rear-admiral on 23 April 1804 as a rear-admiral of the white, keeping Britannia as his flagship and taking Charles Bullen as his flag captain. He stayed on the Brest blockade until detached with Vice-Admiral Robert Calder and twenty ships of the line to reinforce the fleet of Vice-Admiral Cuthbert Collingwood at Cádiz in August 1805, where the combined fleet of Admiral Pierre-Charles Villeneuve was sheltering. By October Carnegie was third in command of the Mediterranean Fleet commanded by Vice-Admiral Lord Nelson off Cádiz. The combined fleet sailed on 18 October and the British fleet came up with them on 21 October to fight what would become the Battle of Trafalgar. Nelson looked to pierce the combined fleet with two columns and for this purpose Britannia was in the windward column led by Nelson in HMS Victory.

Britannia was a slow ship that did not sail well, and so Nelson ordered Carnegie to 'assume a station as most convenient' during the attack, allowing him the best chance to reach the battle on time. Later he was ordered to break through the enemy line behind their fourteenth ship, making Britannia the fourth ship of the windward column to join the action. Upon breaking the enemy line Britannia came up with and dismasted a French 80-gun ship, and then engaged three of the enemy ships attempting to attack Victory. Britannia fought throughout the battle and received fifty-two casualties, of which ten were killed. After the battle was won the British began to secure their prizes, but a large storm meant that many of the newly captured ships had to be abandoned; Carnegie ignored Collingwood's orders to leave the prisoners of war on board the ship nearest to him, Intrépide, and had Britannia's boats rescue them all before scuttling the prize.

Carnegie continued in the fleet after the battle, having transferred his flag to the 98-gun second-rate HMS Dreadnought, until March 1806. For his part in the battle, Carnegie was inducted into the Order of the Bath on 5 June 1806. He also received the thanks of the Houses of Commons and Lords, and the Corporation of London among other organisations. Carnegie was promoted to vice-admiral on 28 April 1808 and admiral on 4 June 1814, but like many other participants at Trafalgar did not serve again during the war. (Note: Dates of promotions: rear-admiral of the red 9 November 1805, vice-admiral of the blue 28 April 1808, vice-admiral of the red 31 July 1810, admiral of the blue 4 June 1814, admiral of the white 19 July 1821, admiral of the red 22 July 1830.) He was granted the honorary position of Rear-Admiral of the United Kingdom on 21 November 1821 and from 1827 to 1830 served as Commander-in-Chief, Plymouth.

Carnegie died on 28 May 1831 in Albemarle Street, London after a short illness, and was buried alongside Nelson and Collingwood in the crypt at St Paul's Cathedral, where his tomb and memorial slab can still be seen.

== Other roles ==
Carnegie served as the governor of the British Linen Company from 1800 to his death in 1831. The company held an important history in the economic development of Scotland, as it stimulated industrial investment in the production of linen and spinning factories across the rural Highlands and the East Coast. By the nineteenth century, the company had undergone a full transformation from a manufacturing company into a bank.

In 1796 Carnegie, as Earl of Northesk, was elected to serve as one of the sixteen Scottish representatives in the Parliament of Great Britain. He subsequently took part in the parliaments of 1802, 1806, and 1830.

== Family ==
Carnegie married Mary Ricketts, only daughter of William Henry Ricketts and niece of Admiral of the Fleet Lord St Vincent, on 9 December 1788 in Paris. They had nine children:

Arms of the 7th to 9th Earls of Northesk

- Mary Carnegie (3 October 1789–7 March 1875) married Walter Long of Preshaw in 1810
- Midshipman George Carnegie, Lord Rosehill (3 November 1791–February 1807), lost in HMS Blenheim
- Anne Letitia Carnegie (10 July 1793–25 February 1870)
- William Hopetoun Carnegie, 8th Earl of Northesk (6 October 1794–5 December 1878)
- Elizabeth Margaret Carnegie (15 May 1797–12 April 1886) married General Frederick Rennell Thackeray in 1825 and had eight children
- Jane Christian Carnegie (14 November 1800 – 1 October 1840)
- John Jervis Carnegie (8 July 1807–18 January 1892)
- Georgina Henrietta Carnegie (2 August 1811–7 November 1827)
- Admiral Swynfen Thomas Carnegie (8 March 1813–20 November 1879)

== Notes and citations ==
=== Citations ===
Military offices
Preceded by Sir James Saumarez	Commander-in-Chief, Plymouth; 1827–1830	Succeeded by Sir Manley Dixon
Honorary titles
Preceded by Sir James Saumarez	Rear-Admiral of the United Kingdom; 1821–1831	Succeeded by Sir Thomas Foley
Peerage of Scotland
Preceded by George Carnegie	Earl of Northesk; 1792–1831	Succeeded by William Carnegie
