= William Cranstoun, 3rd Lord Cranstoun =

William Cranstoun, 3rd Lord Cranstoun (born before 1620, died after July 1664) was a Scottish Lord of Parliament and a renowned Cavalier.

== Origins ==
William Cranstoun was the only son and heir to his father, James, Master of Cranstoun (the second son of William Cranstoun, 1st Lord Cranstoun), by his spouse Elizabeth, daughter of Francis Stewart, 1st Earl of Bothwell. He succeeded to the peerage on the death without issue of his uncle, John Cranstoun, 2nd Lord Cranstoun. The Cranstouns were a prominent Lowland family, whose estates had since at least the 14th century been centred on Cranston (or "Cranstoun"), in Midlothian, and Denholm, in the Borders.

== Royalist ==
In 1648 he was one of the "Engagers" for King Charles I. He accompanied King Charles II into England in 1651 and was taken prisoner at the battle of Worcester, and remained in confinement for several years in the Tower of London. His estate was sequestrated, lands of £200 a year value being settled on his wife and children, and he was excepted from Cromwell's Act of Grace in April 1654.

== Swedish service ==
In 1656 he was allowed to levy 1000 men for the service of king Charles X Gustav of Sweden, and, probably at his instance, was formally pardoned by Parliament in 1657.

== Duel ==
On 15 January 1661/2 he, being then 'of the parish of St. Margaret's, Westminster', was found guilty of slaying Alexander Skringer, Esq., with a rapier in self-defence.

== Marriage ==
Cranstoun married by contract on 10 July 1643, Mary, fifth and youngest daughter of Alexander Leslie, 1st Earl of Leven, by whom he had:

- James Cranstoun, 4th Lord Cranstoun
- Alexander Cranstoun
- Agnes Cranstoun
- Helen Cranstoun, who married the Kirkcaldy mason John Adam; their son was the architect William Adam.
- Margaret Cranstoun
- Christian Cranstoun
- Elizabeth Cranstoun
- Mary Cranstoun
- Barbara Cranstoun

The 3rd Lord Cranstoun was still alive on 29 July 1664, when his son had a charter of lands where he was designated "James, Master of Cranstoun".

Peerage of Scotland
| Preceded by John Cranstoun | Lord Cranstoun ca. 1648–after July 1664 | Succeeded by James Cranstoun |
