= Glenbuchat Castle =

Historic Z plan Scottish castle

- Near Kildrummy, Aberdeenshire, Scotland
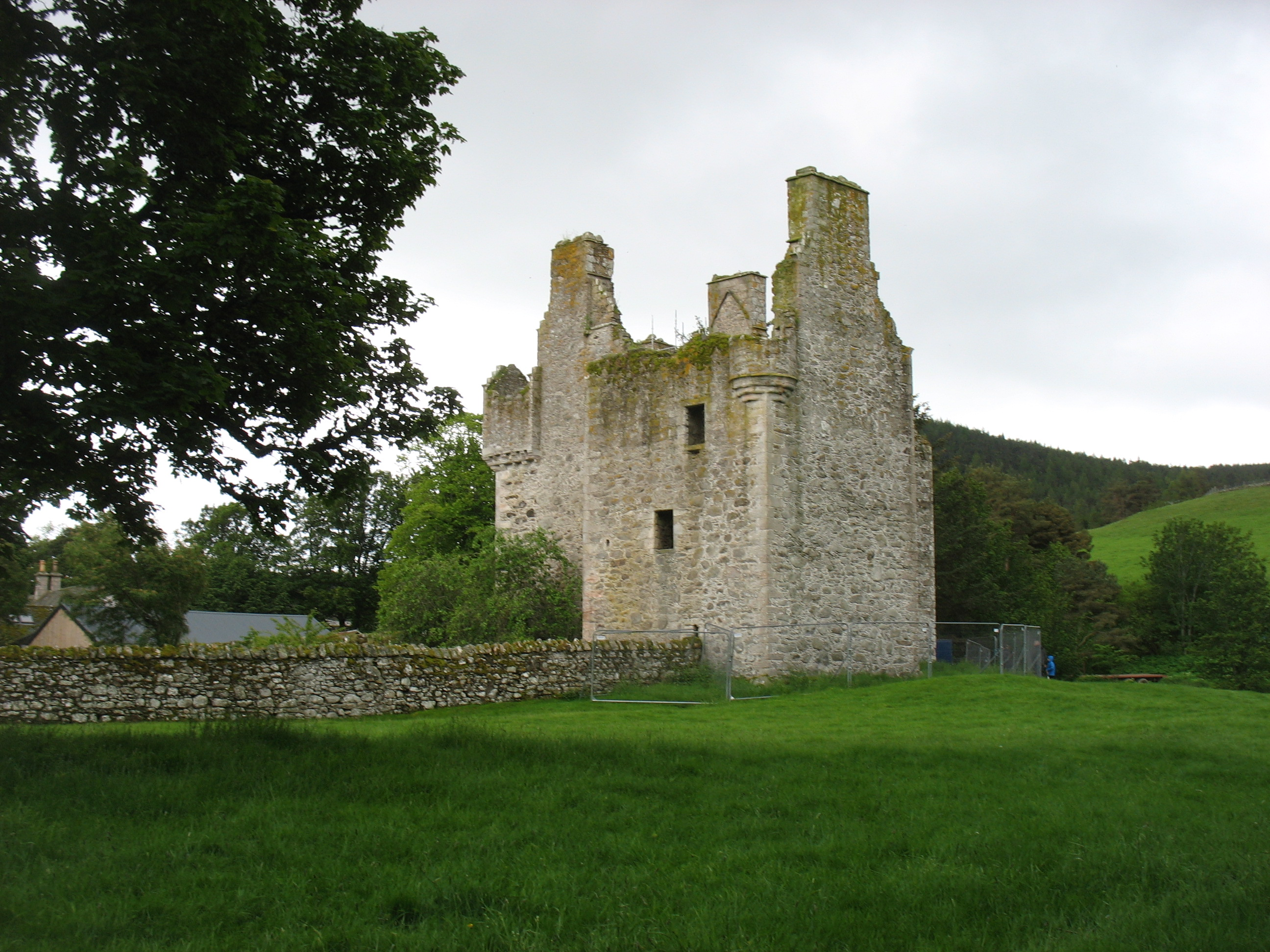
- The castle in 2019

Site information
- Owner: Historic Environment Scotland
- Open to the public: Yes
- Condition: Ruined

Location
- Coordinates: 57.220869°N 2.9997007°W

Scheduled monument
- Official name: Glenbuchat Castle
- Type: Secular: castle; garden
- Designated: 30 November 1981
- Reference no.: SM90151

Glenbuchat Castle is a historic Z plan Scottish castle built in 1590 for John Gordon of Cairnbarrow to mark his wedding. It is located above the River Don, near Kildrummy, Aberdeenshire. The building is roofless, but otherwise in fairly good repair.

== History ==
John Gordon married Helen Carnegie in 1590, a daughter of Robert Carnegie of Kinnaird in Angus. It is said that stone from Kildrummy Castle was used to build their new house.

The castle was taken and garrisoned after the battle of Glenlivet in 1594 by the king's forces.

The family sold the castle in 1738, and it remained in private hands until the 20th century. James William Barclay bought the castle in 1901, and Colonel James Barclay Milne, his grandson, placed it in state care in 1946. A local club purchased the surrounding parkland in 1948 and gave it to the state to ensure that the castle's surroundings would remain intact. Both the castle and the surrounding land are managed by Historic Environment Scotland as a scheduled monument.
