= John Cranstoun, 2nd Lord Cranstoun =

John Cranstoun, 2nd Lord Cranstoun (died in or before 1648) was a Scottish Lord of Parliament.

== Origins ==
Cranstoun was the son of William Cranstoun, 1st Lord Cranstoun, and Sarah Cranstoun, the daughter and co-heiress of Sir John Cranstoun (the last male representative of the earlier line of Cranstoun of Cranstoun). The Cranstouns were a prominent Lowland family, whose estates had since at least the 14th century ( been centred on Cranston (or "Cranstoun"), in Midlothian, and Denholm, in the Borders.

== Estates ==
During his father's life, on 30 June 1619, Cranstoun had a charter of Denholm, Fowlersland, Little Rulwood and other lands to himself and his first wife. On 23 April 1623, an annuity out of Smailholm, Wauchope and other lands was granted to him and his second wife.

Following his father's death in 1627, Cranstoun received charters of Aldingston and Dodes, in Berwickshire, and of Smailholm, Crailing, Cranstondaw (or New Cranstoun), Liggartwood and the barony of Cranstoun, as well as being appointed to the office of coroner for Roxburghshire on 17 January 1638.

He died in or before 1648.

== Family ==
Cranstoun married first (contract dated 22 November 1616 and recorded 20 March 1617) Elizabeth Scott, daughter of Walter Scott, 1st Lord Scott of Buccleuch, and secondly Helen Lindsay, daughter of James Lindsay, 7th Lord Lindsay. He had no children by either marriage and was succeeded on his death by his nephew William, the son of his brother James.

Peerage of Scotland
Preceded by William Cranstoun	Lord Cranstoun; 1627–c.1648	Succeeded by William Cranstoun
