= John Carnegie, 12th Earl of Northesk =

John Douglas Carnegie, 12th Earl of Northesk (16 February 1895 – 22 July 1975) inherited the earldom in 1963.

== Early life ==
Arms 10th to 14th Earls of Northesk

Carnegie was born on 16 February 1895. He was the son of Margaret Jean Johnstone-Douglas and Lt.-Col. Hon. Douglas Carnegie, MP for Winchester. His younger brother David died in 1917 during World War I.

His maternal grandparents were Arthur Johnstone-Douglas and Jane Maitland (née Stewart) Johnstone-Douglas and his paternal grandparents were Lt.-Col. George Carnegie, 9th Earl of Northesk, and the former Elizabeth Georgina Frances Elliot.

He was educated at Gresham's School, Holt and King's College, Cambridge.

== Career ==
Carnegie served in World War I between 1914 and 1918 (mentioned in despatches), Captain (temporary Major), 95th (Hants Yeomanry) Brigade, Royal Field Artillery (TA).

In 1963, Carnegie inherited the earldom from his first cousin David Carnegie, 11th Earl of Northesk, who had died childless.

== Personal life ==
On 20 July 1920 Carnegie married Dorothy Mary Campion, daughter of Col. Sir William Robert Campion (the Governor of Western Australia) and Katherine Mary Byron (a granddaughter of George Byron, 7th Baron Byron). They had four children:

- Mary Elizabeth Carnegie (b. 1921), who married Maj. Donald Arthur Knights in 1942; they divorced in 1954.
- David John Carnegie (1922–1942), who died unmarried.
- Robert Andrew Carnegie, 13th Earl of Northesk (1926–1994), who married Jean Margaret MacRae, daughter of Capt. John MacRae and Lady Phyllis Hervey (daughter of the 4th Marquess of Bristol).
- Susan Jean Carnegie (b. 1930), who married Dr. David Blackall Connell, a son of Dr. Arthur Blackall Connell (and step-son of Dame Ninette de Valois), in 1955.

Lord Northesk died on 22 July 1975 and was succeeded by his second son, Robert.

Peerage of Scotland
Preceded by David Ludovic George Hopetoun Carnegie	Earl of Northesk; 1963–1975	Succeeded by Robert Andrew Carnegie
