= List of life peerages before 1876 =

This is a list of life peerages created prior to the Appellate Jurisdiction Act 1876 and the Life Peerages Act 1958.

== Richard II (1377–1399) ==
- 1377 – Guichard d'Angle, Earl of Huntingdon
- 1385 – Robert de Vere, Marquess of Dublin
  - 1386 – Robert de Vere, Duke of Ireland
- 1397 – Margaret, Duchess of Norfolk

== Henry V (1413–1422) ==
- 1414 – John of Lancaster, Duke of Bedford
- 1414 – Humphrey of Lancaster, Duke of Gloucester
- 1416 – Thomas Beaufort, Duke of Exeter

== Henry VIII (1509–1547) ==
- 1514 – Thomas Howard, Earl of Surrey

== James I (1603–1625) ==
- 1618 – Mary Villiers, Countess of Buckingham

== Charles I (1625–1649) ==
- 1640 – Mary Howard, Baroness Stafford
  - 1688 – Mary Howard, Countess of Stafford
- 1641 – Elizabeth Savage, Countess Rivers
- 1644 – Alice Dudley, Duchess of Dudley

== The Protectorate ==
- 1658–1659 – Cromwell's Other House – The life members of the Other House were addressed as "Lord". About forty men took up their seats in the Other House. However, after the restoration of the monarchy in 1660, neither the chamber nor the titles of men who sat in it were recognised by the restored regime.

== Charles II (1660–1685) ==
- 1660 – Katherine Stanhope, Countess of Chesterfield
- 1660 – Elizabeth Boyle, Countess of Guilford
- 1660 – William Douglas, Duke of Hamilton (Peerage of Scotland; husband of Anne Hamilton, 3rd Duchess of Hamilton)
- 1660 – Walter Scott, Earl of Tarras (Peerage of Scotland; husband of Mary Scott, 3rd Countess of Buccleuch)
- 1672 – James Wemyss, Lord Burntisland (Peerage of Scotland; husband of Margaret Wemyss, 3rd Countess of Wemyss)
- 1673 – Louise de Kérouaille, Duchess of Portsmouth
- 1674 – Anne Murray, Viscountess Bayning
- 1674 – Susan Belasyse, Baroness Belasyse
- 1679 – Sarah Corbet, Viscountess Corbet
- 1680 – Elizabeth Walter, Countess of Sheppey
- 1685 – Francis Abercromby, Lord Glasford (Peerage of Scotland; husband of Anne Sempill, 9th Lady Sempill)

== James II (1685–1689) ==
- 1686 – Catherine Sedley, Countess of Dorchester
- 1688 – Elizabeth Petty, Baroness Shelburne (Peerage of Ireland)

== George I (1714–1727) ==
- 1716 – Ehrengard Melusine von der Schulenburg, Duchess of Munster (Peerage of Ireland)
  - 1719 – Ehrengard Melusine von der Schulenburg, Duchess of Kendal
- 1721 – Sophia Charlotte von Kielmansegg, Countess of Leinster (Peerage of Ireland)
  - 1722 – Sophia Charlotte von Kielmansegg, Countess of Darlington
- 1722 – Melusina von der Schulenburg, Countess of Walsingham

== George II (1727–1760) ==
- 1740 – Amalie Sophie Marianne von Wallmoden, Countess of Yarmouth
- 1758 – Ellis Bermingham, Countess of Brandon

== Victoria (1837–1901) ==
- 1856 – James Parke, Baron Wensleydale

== See also ==
- List of life peerages after 1958
- List of law life peerages
- List of peerages created for women
