= Ethie Castle =

Scottish castle

Coordinates: 56.6124°N 2.5109°W

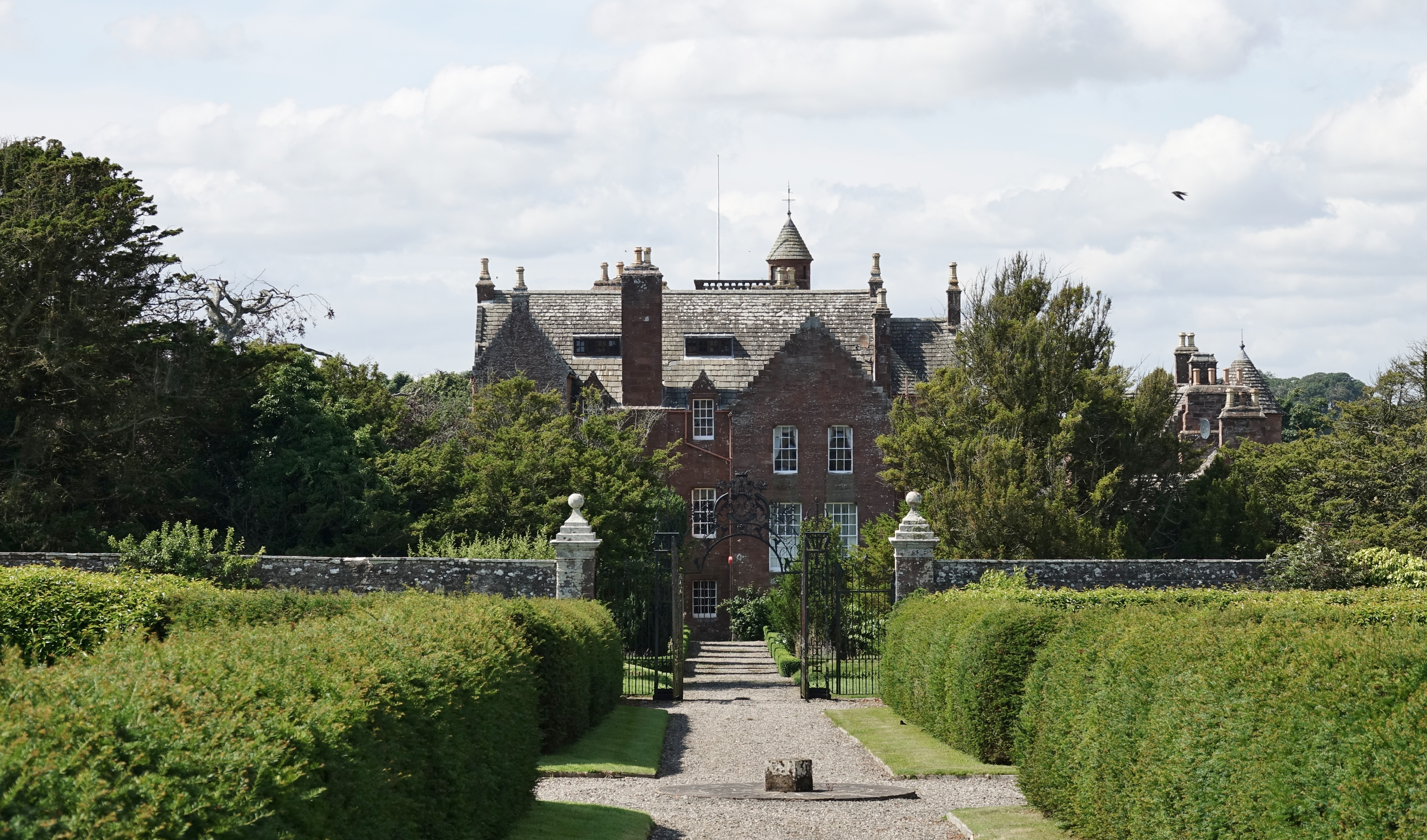
- The castle in 2021
- Interactive map of the Ethie Castle area
- Former names: Ethie Castle

General information
- Location: Angus, Scotland

Ethie Castle is a 14th-century castle covering 15,091 square feet (1,402.0 m^{2}). It is located approximately 3 miles north of the fishing town of Arbroath in Angus, Scotland.

== History ==
Ethie Castle dates to around 1300, when the monks at nearby Arbroath Abbey built a sandstone keep. The castle passed through the hands of the de Maxwell family and into the ownership of Scotland's last Cardinal, David Beaton who was murdered in St. Andrews in 1546. Its association with Cardinal Beaton is still evident as the castle includes a small chapel and the Cardinal's Sitting Room, with its secret staircase to the Great Hall above.

The castle was purchased in 1665 by the Carnegie family, who later became the Earls of Northesk. The 7th Earl was a Vice Admiral and commanded with Nelson at the Battle of Trafalgar in 1805. As a tribute, the Earl was entitled to incorporate Trafalgar in his arms and this can still be seen set in a dormer at Ethie. In 1927 the castle and grounds were bought by Glasgow artist and antique collector William Cunningham Hector.

The castle is reputed to be the basis for the fictional Castle of Knockwhinnock in Sir Walter Scott's novel The Antiquary. Sir Walter Scott was a close friend of William Carnegie, 8th Earl of Northesk and frequently stayed at Ethie Castle.

The castle was restored by the chief of the Forsyth Clan, Alistair Forsyth and it now serves as the clan's seat.

== Ghosts ==
The castle is said to be haunted by a Grey Lady spectre as well as by David Beaton who was Abbot of Arbroath in the 16th Century.
