= William Cunningham Hector =

Scottish painter and antique collector

- Born: 20 September 1875; Rio de Janeiro, Brazil
- Died: 1 October 1929 (aged 54); Arbroath, Scotland
- Known for: Painting, antique collecting

William Cunningham Hector (20 September 1875 – 1 October 1929) was a Scottish painter and antique collector. He is known for landscapes of Glasgow and surrounding area. In 1928 he bought Ethie Castle, just outside Arbroath.

== Life ==
His father was William Hector (1843 – 12 September 1913) from Eastwood, Renfrewshire; a merchant. His mother was Janet Dick Anderson, known as Jessie, (18 February 1848 – 25 September 1932) from Glasgow. They married on 24 November 1874 in Ledcameroch, Bearsden, East Dumbartonshire.

William Cunningham Hector was born while the couple were in Rio de Janeiro, Brazil on 20 September 1875.

However he is on the 1881 census, in Glasgow, six years later. The family were staying at 8 Burnbank Terrace and he is at school in Glasgow. He went to Glasgow University in 1894 to study English Literature.

He married Margaret Logan Bisland (12 June 1880 – 15 August 1968).

On his father William Hector's death, the couple became very rich. He had left his son an estate of £25,054, 16 shillings and 4 pence (gross), subject to a £300 annuity to a Miss Johanna Maloney.

William and Margaret had a daughter Enid Cunningham Hector (14 May 1914 – 11 June 2008). Enid married a Polish exile Ignacy Nitosławski. They died in Cape Town, South Africa.

He bought Ethie Castle in 1928. He also owned Marlybank, Huntly Gardens, Kelvinside in Glasgow.

== Art ==
The Glasgow Society of Artists exhibited at the Dore Gallery in London in May 1905. Hector's work Giffnock Quarry was part of that exhibition.

In 1908 he exhibited at the Royal Scottish Academy his work: Portrait.

Hector was known also as an antique collector. When he bought a set of chairs from an antique dealer that proved to be modern in 1912, the case ended up in the Court of Session in Edinburgh. The dealer had made no indication of the age of the chairs and the price was reasonable for modern chairs, but Hector had believed he was buying antiques from the dealer. The dealer had appealed the case and was looking for monies, but Hector won the case.

He became a member of The Arts Club in London in 1915.

== Death ==
He died on 1 October 1929 at Ethie Castle. He is buried in Inverkeilor Churchyard. The value of his estate was £17,882, 10 shillings and 9 pence.
