= Douglas Carnegie =

British politician (1870–1937)

Lieutenant-Colonel The Honourable Douglas Carnegie

Member of Parliament for Winchester
- In office 1916–1918
- Preceded by: Guy Baring
- Succeeded by: George Hennessy

Personal details
- Born: Douglas George Carnegie; 4 January 1870
- Died: 27 February 1937 (aged 67)
- Party: Conservative
- Spouse: Margaret Jean Johnstone-Douglas (after 1894)
- Relations: Robert Carnegie, 13th Earl of Northesk (grandson)
- Children: 4, including John Carnegie, 12th Earl of Northesk
- Parent(s): George Carnegie, 9th Earl of Northesk; Elizabeth Georgina Frances Elliot

Lieutenant-Colonel The Honourable Douglas George Carnegie (4 January 1870 – 27 February 1937) was a British politician who was Conservative Member of Parliament for Winchester from 1916 to 1918.

== Early life ==
He was the son of Lieutenant-Colonel George Carnegie, 9th Earl of Northesk and Elizabeth Georgina Frances Elliot.

== Career ==
Carnegie was commissioned into the 3rd Battalion (Royal South Gloucestershire Militia), Gloucestershire Regiment, in 1888. He resigned his commission as a major in 1905. From 1917 to 1918 he served with the Labour Corps and was promoted lieutenant-colonel.

From 1916 to 1918, he served as a Conservative Member of Parliament for Winchester.

== Personal life ==
He married Margaret Jean Johnstone-Douglas, daughter of Arthur Henry Johnstone-Douglas and Jane Maitland Stewart, on 26 April 1894. Together, they lived at Fair Oak, Rogate, Sussex, and had four children:

- John Douglas Carnegie, 12th Earl of Northesk (1895–1975), who married Dorothy Mary Campion, daughter of the Governor of Western Australia, Col. Sir William Robert Campion, and Katherine Mary Byron (a granddaughter of George Byron, 7th Baron Byron), in 1920.
- David Alexander Carnegie (1897–1917), who was killed in action during World War I.
- Lady Jean Douglas Carnegie (b. 1899), who married Lt.-Col. James David Bibby, son of Alfred Bibby.
- Margaret Carnegie (1901–1946), who died unmarried.

Carnegie died on 27 February 1937. In 1963, his eldest son John succeeded his nephew David to become the 12th Earl of Northesk.

Parliament of the United Kingdom
| Preceded by Guy Baring | Member of Parliament for Winchester; 1916–1918 | Succeeded by George Hennessy |
