= David Carnegie of Colluthie =

Scottish administrator

David Carnegie of Colluthie (1559–1598) was a Scottish landowner and administrator.

== Career ==
David Carnegie was the younger son of Sir Robert Carnegie of Kinnaird (d. 1565) and Margaret Guthrie (d. 1571). Colluthie is near Leuchars in the parish of Moonzie. David Carnegie had lands at Panbride in Forfarshire. When his older brother John Carnegie died in 1595, he became laird of Kinnaird.

In December 1593, Carnegie was appointed to a committee to audit the account of money spent by the Chancellor, John Maitland of Thirlestane, on the royal voyages. The funds in question came from the English subsidy and the dowry of Anne of Denmark.

He was an auditor of the Scottish exchequer in 1595 and joined the government finance committee known as the Octavians in 1596.

He took down the old kirk of Cookstoun to build a new church at Kinnaird.

In 1583 he acquired Cruivie Castle in Logie, Fife from his daughter Margaret.

His niece Catherine Carnegie (d. 1597) was abducted with a view to a forced marriage with James Gray, a son of Patrick Gray, 5th Lord Gray, in Edinburgh in 1593. She was taken from the house of the merchant Robert Jousie by the courtiers John Wemyss of Logie and Sir James Sandilands of Slamannan.

He died on 19 April 1598.

== Marriages and family ==
David Carnegie married (1) Elizabeth Ramsay, the heir of Henry Ramsay of Colluthie and Leuchars who was killed at the battle of Pinkie in 1547, (2) Euphame Wemyss (d. 1593), daughter of John Wemyss of Wemyss, (3) Janet Henrison. His children included:

- David Carnegie of Kinnaird, created Lord Carnegie, and Earl of Southesk
- John Carnegie, created Earl of Northesk
- Alexander Carnegie
- Robert Carnegie
- Katherine Carnegie, who married John Aytoun of Kinnaldie, brother of the poet Robert Aytoun
- Elizabeth Carnegie, daughter of Elizabeth Ramsay, who married John Inglis younger of Inglistarvit in 1579
- Jean Carnegie
- Margaret Carnegie (d. 1589), younger daughter of Elizabeth Ramsay, who married William Dundas of Fingask in 1582
- Agnes Carnegie, who married Alexander Falconer of Halkertoun, and was the mother of Sir Alexander Falconer, 1st Lord Falconer of Halkerton
- Euphame Carnegie, who married Robert Graham, younger of Morphie
