= David Carnegie, 2nd Earl of Northesk =

Arms of the 1st to 6th and 15th Earls of Northesk

David Carnegie, 2nd Earl of Northesk was born the son of John Carnegie, 1st Earl of Northesk and Magdalen Haliburton before 1627. He died on 12 December 1679. He married Lady Jean Maule, daughter of Patrick Maule, 1st Earl of Panmure, on 19 October 1637 and had seven children:

- David Carnegie, 3rd Earl of Northesk (November 1643)
- James Carnegie (married Anna Maitland in 1674, d. 10 March 1707)
- Patrick Carnegie (married first in 1682 to Marjory Threlpland, daughter of Sir William Threlpland of Fingask, second in 1702 to Margaret Stewart, d. 7 December 1723, ancestor of later Earls of Northesk beginning with the 15th Earl)
- Alexander Carnegie (married first to Ann Blair Lady Kinfauns, daughter of Sir William Blair of Kinfauns, second to Margaret Nairne of Muckarsie)
- Robert Carnegie (died young)
- Jean Carnegie (c. 1645–1679, married Colin Lindsay, 3rd Earl of Balcarres in 1673)
- Magdalen Carnegie (married John Moodie of Ardbikie)

Peerage of Scotland
Preceded by John Carnegie	Earl of Northesk; 1667–1669	Succeeded by David Carnegie
