= Patrick Carnegy, 15th Earl of Northesk =

British music critic

Arms of the 15th Earl of Northesk

Patrick Charles Carnegy, 15th Earl of Northesk (born 23 September 1940), is a British hereditary peer, journalist and scholar.

== Early life and education ==
Northesk is the son of The Reverend Canon Patrick Charles Alexander Carnegy and Joyce Eleanor Townsley. He is an agnatic descendant of David Carnegie, 2nd Earl of Northesk, and inherited the earldom on the deaths of both his eighth cousin twice removed, Alexander Robert Macrae Carnegie, in 2001; and his eighth cousin once removed, David Carnegie, 14th Earl of Northesk, on 28 March 2010.

Northesk was educated at Rugby School and Trinity Hall, Cambridge, matriculating in 1960.

== Career ==
Northesk was on the staff of the The Times Educational Supplement from 1964 to 1988, and was assistant editor of The Times Literary Supplement (TLS) between 1969 and 1978. From 1978 to 1988 he was music books editor at Faber and Faber Ltd and from 1988 Director of Faber Music Ltd.

As a broadcaster, he was a regular contributor in the 1970s and 1980s to the BBC Radio 4 arts magazine Kaleidoscope. His contributions to BBC Radio 3 have included documentaries on Thomas Mann, Franz Kafka, the Barenboim/Kupfer Ring at Bayreuth (1988), and the first assessment of the Ring on DVD for CD Review (2008) Radio 3's CD Review. For television he contributed to BBC 2's documentary film Wagner in the Great Composers series (1998).

Carnegy was course director of the Bayreuth International Youth Festival from 1968 and also for the Britten-Pears School for Advanced Musical Studies from 1980. In 1988 he was invited by Jeremy Isaacs to create the post of dramaturg (literary and repertory adviser) at the Royal Opera House. There he initiated a programme of lectures, study days and other events open to all. He was awarded a Leverhulme Research Fellowship (1994–1996).

He was a founding member of the Bayreuth International Arts Centre. He served on the BBC Central Music Advisory Committee (1986–1989) and on the BBC General Advisory Council (1990–1996).

His books include Faust as Musician: A Study of Thomas Mann's novel 'Doctor Faustus' (Chatto & Windus, 1973) and Wagner and the Art of the Theatre (2006, Royal Philharmonic Society Award, Special Jury Prize George Freedley Memorial Award), which took 40 years to write. Other publications include reviews and articles on German literature, music, opera (especially Wagner) and theatre for The Times Literary and Educational Supplements, the London Review of Books, The Spectator, The Musical Times, and other journals.

== Marriage ==
Lord Northesk lived with his wife, the late soprano Jill Gomez, in Cambridgeshire. They had no children.

The heir presumptive to the earldom is Lord Northesk's younger brother, Colin David Carnegy (born 1942).

Peerage of Scotland
Preceded by David Carnegie	Earl of Northesk; 2010–present	Incumbent; Heir presumptive: Colin Carnegy
