= Sir James Halyburton =

Scottish landowner and politician

Sir James Halyburton or Haliburton of Pitcur was a Scottish landowner and politician.

== Biography ==
He was the son of Sir George Halyburton of Pitcur and a great-nephew of James Halyburton, tutor of Pitcur. In 1586 his father granted the lands of Thorngreen to James and his future wife Margaret, daughter of James Scrimgeour of Dudhope. In 1617, as laird of Pitcur, he represented the barons of Forfarshire in the convention of Estates and the Parliament of Scotland.

His children included:

- James Haliburton of Pitcur, who married Maria, daughter of Robert Ker, 1st Earl of Roxburghe
- William Haliburton of Pitcur, who married Marjorie, daughter of David Carnegie, 1st Earl of Southesk
- George Haliburton of Keilour, who was the grandfather of Margaret Haliburton who married Sir George Mackenzie of Rosehaugh, and great-grandfather of James Halyburton who was commissioner for Forfarshire at the time of the Union
- Magdalen Haliburton, who married John Carnegie, 1st Earl of Northesk
- Margaret Haliburton, who married James Elphinstone, 1st Lord Coupar.
- Catherine Haliburton, who married John Bethune, 12th of Balfour, commissioner for Fife in 1644, 1646, and 1649.
