= David Carnegie, 14th Earl of Northesk =

British noble (1954–2010)

The Right Honourable The Earl of Northesk
- Lord Northesk in parliament, 2009

Member of the House of Lords
- Lord Temporal
- Hereditary peerage 14 June 1994 – 11 November 1999
- Preceded by: The 13th Earl of Northesk
- Succeeded by: Seat abolished
- Elected Hereditary Peer; 11 November 1999 – 28 March 2010
- Election: 1999
- Preceded by: Seat established
- Succeeded by: The 5th Viscount Younger of Leckie

Personal details
- Born: David John MacRae Carnegie; 2 November 1954
- Died: 28 March 2010 (aged 55)
- Party: Conservative
- Parent(s): Robert Carnegie, 13th Earl of Northesk; Jean Margaret MacRae
- Occupation: Landowner, politician and peer

David John MacRae Carnegie, 14th Earl of Northesk (3 November 1954 – 28 March 2010), styled Lord Rosehill between 1975 and 1994, was a British hereditary peer, landowner and member of the House of Lords.

== Background ==
David Carnegie was the second son of Robert Carnegie, 13th Earl of Northesk, and Jean Margaret MacRae.

== Political career ==
Lord Northesk inherited the earldom on his father's death in 1994, his elder brother having been accidentally drowned in infancy. He thereby became a member of the House of Lords, where he sat on the Conservative benches. He was later one of the 92 peers elected to remain in the House following the passing of the House of Lords Act 1999. In the House of Lords, he spoke on topics relating to civil liberties and privacy, and spoke out against the Identity Cards Act 2006 and new online copyright laws such as those contained in the Digital Economy Act 2010.

== Family ==
Lord Northesk married Jacqueline Dundas Reid in 1979. They had four children:

- Alexander Robert Macrae Carnegie, Lord Rosehill (born 16 November 1980, committed suicide 31 August 2001)
- Lady Sarah Louise Mary Carnegie (born 29 October 1982)
- Lady Fiona Jean Elizabeth Carnegie (born 24 March 1987)
- Lady Sophie Margaret Jean Carnegie (born 9 January 1990)

In 2001, his eldest child and only son Lord Rosehill, a psychiatric patient, shot himself in the head with his father's gun whilst on leave from hospital at the family's farm in West Sussex. He was 20 years old.

Northesk died at the age of 55 from cancer and was succeeded in the earldom by his eighth cousin once removed, Patrick Carnegy. His vacated seat in the House of Lords triggered a by-election for a Conservative hereditary peer to replace him.

Coat of arms of David Carnegie, 14th Earl of Northesk
Crest 1st, The stern of a French Man-of-War with three Lanthorns, all proper, inflamed Gules, on a Scroll the word TRAFALGAR; 2nd, Issuant from a Naval Crown Or, a Demi-Leopard proper, holding a Rose Argent, barbed and seeded proper, on a Scroll the words BRITANNIA VICTRIX. Escutcheon Quarterly: 1st & 4th, Or, an Eagle displayed Azure, armed, beaked and membered Sable, and charged on the breast with a Naval Crown Or (Carnegie); 2nd & 3rd, Argent, a Pale Gules (Earldom of Northesk). Supporters On either side a Leopard reguardant proper, gorged with Roses Argent, barbed and seeded Vert, each supporting a Banner of St George proper.

Peerage of Scotland
Preceded by Robert Carnegie	Earl of Northesk; 1994–2010; Member of the House of Lords (1994–1999)	Succeeded by Patrick Carnegy
Parliament of the United Kingdom
New office created by the House of Lords Act 1999	Elected hereditary peer to the House of Lords under the House of Lords Act 1999; 1999–2010	Succeeded by The Viscount Younger of Leckie
