= David Carnegie, 5th Earl of Northesk =

Arms of the 1st to 6th and 15th Earls of Northesk

David Carnegie, 5th Earl of Northesk (11 June 1701 – 24 June 1741) was the son of David Carnegie, 4th Earl of Northesk and Lady Margaret Wemyss. He died at the age of 40, unmarried. He had, by Isabel Rarity, a son, Sylvester who was born on 16 January 1732, and married Margaret Peter on 9 June 1755.

Peerage of Scotland
Preceded by David Carnegie	Earl of Northesk; 1729–1741	Succeeded by George Carnegie
