= David Carnegie, 1st Earl of Southesk =

Scottish nobleman

The Right Honourable The Earl of Southesk PC
- Born: David Carnegie; 1575
- Died: February 1658 (aged 82–83)
- Spouse: Margaret Lindsay (m. 1595; died 1614)
- Children: 10, including James
- Parent(s): David Carnegie of Colluthie; Euphame Wemyss
- Relatives: John Carnegie, 1st Earl of Northesk (brother); Sir Robert Carnegie (grandfather)

Sir David Carnegie, 1st Earl of Southesk, 1st Baron Carnegie of Kinnaird, 1st Baron Carnegie PC (1575 – February 1658), of Kinnaird and Leuchards, was a Scottish nobleman. He was a member of the Privy Council of Scotland and held the office of Lord of Session.

== Early life ==
He was the eldest son of David Carnegie of Colluthie and his second wife, Euphame Wemyss (d. 1593), daughter of John Wemyss of Wemyss. Among his siblings were John Carnegie, 1st Earl of Northesk.

His paternal grandparents were Sir Robert Carnegie of Kinnaird and Margaret Guthrie.

== Career ==
At the Union of the Crowns in 1603, James VI and I travelled to England. He wrote to David Carnegie from Newcastle upon Tyne on 10 April 1603, inviting him to escort the queen Anne of Denmark to England.

On 14 April 1616, he was created Lord Carnegie of Kinnaird, to him and his heirs male bearing the name and arms of Carnegie. He was further ennobled on 22 June 1633 as Lord Carnegie of Kinnaird and Leuchars, and Earl of Southesk, with remainder to his heirs male forever, in the Peerage of Scotland.

== Personal life ==
On 8 October 1595, he married Margaret Lindsay, only daughter of Hon. Sir David Lindsay of Edzell (eldest son of the 9th Earl of Crawford) and, his first wife, Lady Helen Lindsay (only daughter of the 10th Earl of Crawford). Before her death, they were the parents of several children:

- Hon. David Carnegie (c. 1596–1633), styled Lord Carnegie, who married Lady Margaret Hamilton, eldest daughter of Thomas Hamilton, 1st Earl of Haddington, by his second wife Margaret Foulis (a daughter of James Foulis of Colinton), in 1613. After his death, she married, as his third wife, James Johnstone, 1st Earl of Hartfell.
- James Carnegie, 2nd Earl of Southesk (b. c. 1600–1669), who married Lady Mary Halyburton, the widow of Sir James Halyburton of Pitcur, third daughter of Robert Ker, 1st Earl of Roxburghe, and Margaret Maitland (only daughter and heiress of Sir William Maitland of Lethington).
- Hon. Sir John Carnegie (d. 1654), who married Hon. Jane Scrymgeour, a daughter of John Scrymgeour, 1st Viscount of Dudhope, and Margaret Seton (a daughter of Sir David Seton of Parbroath).
- Hon. Sir Alexander Carnegie (d. 1682), who married Margaret Arbuthnott, a daughter of Sir Robert Arbuthnott of Arbuthnott and, his second wife, Hon. Margaret Fraser (a daughter of the 6th Lord Lovat). She was the sister of Robert Arbuthnott, 1st Viscount of Arbuthnott.
- Lady Margaret Carnegie (d. 1661), who married William Ramsay, 1st Earl of Dalhousie.
- Lady Agnes Carnegie (d. 1637), who married Sir James Sandilands, of Petlair.
- Lady Catherine Carnegie (d. c. 1655), who married John Stewart, 1st Earl of Traquair.
- Lady Marjory Carnegie (d. 1651), who married Robert Arbuthnott, 1st Viscount of Arbuthnott, a son of Sir Robert Arbuthnott of Arbuthnott.
- Lady Elizabeth Carnegie, who married Andrew Murray, 1st Lord Balvaird, in 1628.
- Lady Magdalene Carnegie (d. c. 1648), who married James Graham, 1st Marquess of Montrose.

His wife died on 9 July 1614. Lord Southesk died in February 1658 and was succeeded in his titles by his second son, James.

Peerage of Scotland
New creation	Earl of Southesk; 1633–1658	Succeeded by James Carnegie
