= David Wemyss, 2nd Earl of Wemyss =

Scottish earl (1610–1679)

David Wemyss, 2nd Earl of Wemyss (6 September 1610 – July 1679) was an army officer.

He was the only son of John Wemyss, 1st Earl of Wemyss and Jean Gray (d. 1640), daughter of Lord Gray. As Lord Elcho, a title he held between 1633 and 1649, he commanded a regiment of Fife infantry in the Scottish army which reached Newcastle upon Tyne in August 1640. On 1 September 1644, at the head of about 6000 men, he was routed by Montrose at Tippermuir, and in August 1645, as supernumerary commander to Lieutenant-General William Baillie, again suffered defeat by Montrose's forces at Kilsyth.

He married three times:

- (July 1625) Anna Balfour (d. 1649), daughter of Robert Balfour, 2nd Lord Balfour of Burleigh; they had one daughter who survived to adulthood, Jean Wemyss (1629-1715), who married (1), Archibald Douglas, 1st Earl of Ormond (2), George Gordon, 15th Earl of Sutherland.
- (April 1650) Helenor (d. 1652), daughter of John Fleming, 2nd Earl of Wigtown;
- (13 January 1653) Margaret (d. 1688), daughter of John Leslie, 6th Earl of Rothes, and widow of Francis Scott, 2nd Earl of Buccleuch; one daughter, Margaret.

He died in 1679 at Wemyss Castle in Fife, whose estate he had done much to develop. The estates and titles passed to his daughter Margaret Wemyss, 3rd Countess of Wemyss.

Peerage of Scotland
| Preceded by John Wemyss | Earl of Wemyss; 1649–1679 | Succeeded by Margaret Wemyss |
