= William Carnegie, 8th Earl of Northesk =

British noble (1794–1878)

Arms of the 7th to 9th Earls of Northesk

William Hopetoun Carnegie, 8th Earl of Northesk (16 October 1794 – 1878) was a British peer. Born to William Carnegie, 7th Earl of Northesk and Mary Ricketts, he died on 5 December 1878 at age of 84. Lord Northesk married Georgiana Maria Elliot, daughter of Admiral Sir George Elliot and Eliza Cecilia Ness, on 14 February 1843 and had two children:

- Margaret Mary Adeliza Carnegie (d. 27 September 1871)
- Lt.-Col. George John Carnegie, 9th Earl of Northesk (1 December 1843–9 September 1891)

Northesk was paid £3,529 from the British government under the terms of the Slave Compensation Act 1837, as he was a trustee for the "Canaan" slave plantation in the British colony of Jamaica, which was owned by Edward Jervis Jervis, 2nd Viscount St Vincent.

Peerage of Scotland
Preceded by William Carnegie	Earl of Northesk; 1831–1871	Succeeded by George Carnegie
