= David Carnegie, 11th Earl of Northesk =

British politician (1901–1963)

The Right Honourable The Earl of Northesk
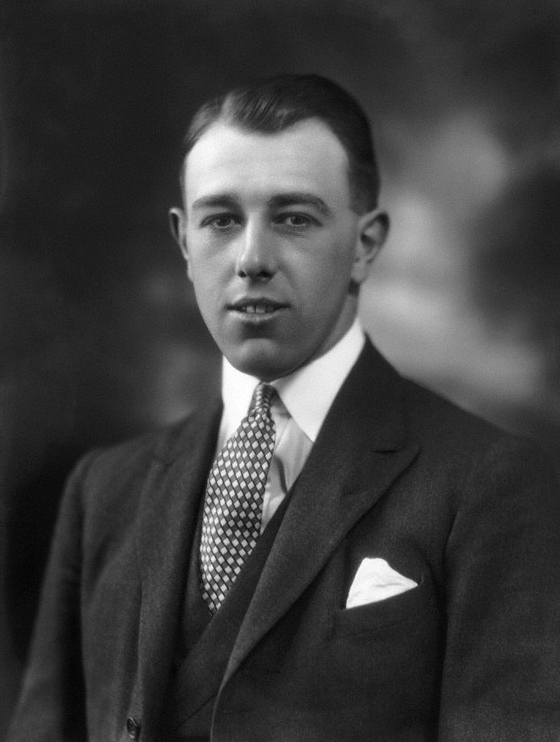
- David Carnegie in 1923

Personal information
- Born: 24 September 1901 London, England
- Died: 7 November 1963 (aged 62) Binfield, Bracknell Forest, England

Sport
- Sport: Skeleton
Medal record
Representing United Kingdom
Olympic Games
Skeleton
Bronze medal – third place	1928 St. Moritz	Men

David Ludovic George Hopetoun Carnegie, 11th Earl of Northesk (24 September 1901 – 7 November 1963) was elected a Scottish representative peer. He was also a skeleton competitor who won a bronze medal at the 1928 Winter Olympics.

== Early life ==
Carnegie was born at 6 Hans Crescent, London SW1 on 24 September 1901. He was the only son of David Carnegie, 10th Earl of Northesk and Elizabeth Boyle Hallowes. His sister, Lady Katherine Jane Elizabeth Carnegie, was married to Lt.-Col. William Bridgeman Lambert Manley and, after their divorce, Brig. Edward Leathley Armitage.

His paternal grandparents were George Carnegie, 9th Earl of Northesk and, his cousin, Elizabeth Georgina Frances Elliot (eldest daughter of his Adm. Sir George Elliot). His mother was the eldest daughter of Maj.-Gen. George Skene Hallowes.

He was educated at St. Aubyns Preparatory School, Rottingdean and Gresham's School, Holt

== Career ==
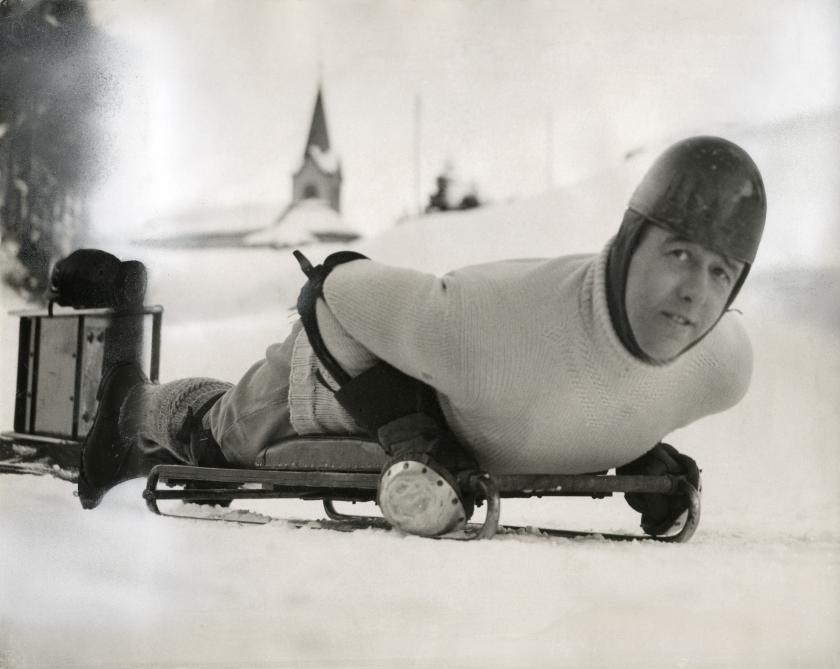
Lord Northesk in St. Moritz, Switzerland, 1935.

He succeeded his father as 11th earl on 5 December 1921. From 1921 to 1923 he was on the supplementary list or reserve of Officers for the Coldstream Guards. He resigned from the Coldstream Guards to marry his first wife.

Lord Northesk won a bronze medal in skeleton at the 1928 Winter Olympics, of which he held the world record. While at the Olympics, Lord Northesk was a passenger on the famous bobsled run at St. Moritz with King Albert I of Belgium.

"Colonel Warwick Wright, an Englishman, was pilot of the sled, with King Albert and Dudley De La Vigne as passengers and the Earl of Northesk seated last as brakeman. All went well for two runs at breakneck speed down the smooth slide, but the third time the sled started out it skidded at a corner near the top and partly overturned in a cloud of ice and snow. The Earl of Northesk was thrown twenty feet into a pile of snow, wrenching his back. The King was about to follow suit, despite his efforts to hold on, but Mr. De La Vigne decided just in time 'not to stand on ceremony' and grasped the King's old green hunting suit firmly by the seat of his trousers. The King and his rescuer fell off in the snow, but escaped practically unscathed."

=== World War II ===
During the Second World War he served in the Intelligence Corps and was demobilised as a Major in 1945, having finished his war time service at the Intelligence Corps Depot. He later farmed 200 acres (0.81 km^{2}) at Beer Farm, Binfield, Bracknell, Berkshire, as well as his parliamentary duties.

== Personal life ==
Arms of the 10th to 14th Earls of Northesk

On 19 July 1923, in Chicago, Northesk married Jessica Ruth (née Brown) Reinhard, a former Ziegfeld Follies dancer. Jessica, the former wife of naval engineer Cyril de Witt Reinhard, was a daughter of F. A. Brown of Buffalo, New York. In February 1927, Northesk pleaded guilty to a charge of being drunk and disorderly after he was arrested with a friend, Charles Kearley, for uprooting a lamp post in London.

Northesk’s first wife divorced him at Edinburgh, Scotland, in October 1928, accusing him of "misconduct in Paris." On 18 December 1928, she married Vivian E. Cornelius, of Windlesham, Surrey, an honorary attaché to the British Embassy in Brussels. Northesk announced his engagement to another American stage figure, Peggy Hopkins Joyce, who soon announced that she had cancelled the engagement, as she was prevented from marrying by a stage contract. Northesk said he would wait.

On 7 August 1929, at a London register office, Northesk married Elizabeth "Betty" Vlasto (died 1991). She was a daughter of Anthony Augustus Vlasto of Binfield Park and a cousin of the well-known tennis player Julie Vlasto. Although no children were born to this second marriage, Northesk adopted a daughter:

- Phyllida Rosemary Carnegie (b. 1942), who married, firstly, in 1968, Daniel Hurt Palmer Mellen, son of William Palmer Mellen. In 1973 she married secondly Marcus Mervyn Cooke, son of John Sholto Fitzpatrick Cooke.

Northesk died at Bracknell, Berkshire, on 7 November 1963, and was succeeded by his first cousin John Carnegie, 12th Earl of Northesk. A report of his death in The New York Times noted that he had been a colourful figure in the 1920s, but had dropped out of the news.

Peerage of Scotland
Preceded by David Carnegie	Earl of Northesk; 1921–1963	Succeeded by John Carnegie
