= James Wemyss, Lord Burntisland =

Scottish peer

James Wemyss, Lord Burntisland (bef. 1657 – December 1682) was a Scottish peer.

Weymss was the son of General Sir James Wemyss of Caskieberry. On 28 March 1672, he married his cousin, Lady Margaret Wemyss and they later had three surviving children:

- Lady Anna (18 October 1675 – 1702), married David Melville, 3rd Earl of Leven.
- Lady Margaret (1 April 1677 – 29 March 1763), married David Carnegie, 4th Earl of Northesk.
- David, later 4th Earl of Wemyss (1678–1720).

Almost a month after his marriage, Wemyss was created Lord Burntisland for life and died in 1682.
