= David Carnegie, 4th Earl of Northesk =

Scottish peer and politician

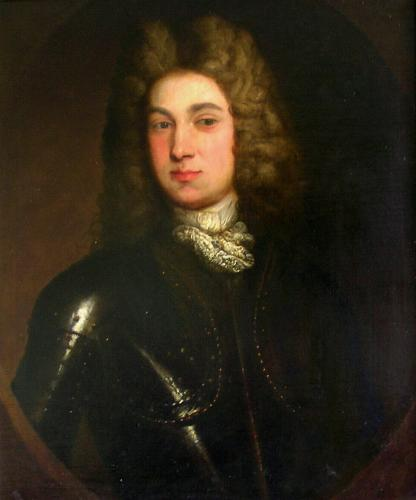
- Born: 1675
- Died: 14 January 1729 (aged 53–54)
- Spouse(s): Margaret Wemyss, Countess of Wemyss
- Children: 7, including David and George
- Parent(s): David Carnegie, 3rd Earl of Northesk; Lady Elizabeth Lindsay

Arms of the 1st to 6th and 15th Earls of Northesk

David Carnegie, 4th Earl of Northesk (1675 – 14 January 1729) was a Scottish peer and politician.

He was born the son of David Carnegie, 3rd Earl of Northesk and Elizabeth Lindsay. He was invested as a Privy Councillor of Scotland in 1698 and held the office of Sheriff of Forfar in 1702. He held the office of Lord Commissioner of Treasury for Scotland from 1705 until 1708. He served as a representative peer between 1708 and 1715 and was Commissioner of Trade and Manufacturers in 1711.

He married Lady Margaret Wemyss, daughter of James Wemyss, Lord Burntisland and Margaret Wemyss, 3rd Countess of Wemyss, on 29 January 1697 and had seven children, including:

- Elizabeth Carnegie (2 January 1699 – 21 September 1767)
- David Carnegie, 5th Earl of Northesk (11 June 1701 – 24 June 1741)
- Margaret Carnegie (1702–7 July 1722)
- Admiral George Carnegie, 6th Earl of Northesk (2 August 1716 – 20 January 1792)
- Anne Carnegie (1729)

Peerage of Scotland
Preceded by David Carnegie	Earl of Northesk; 1688–1729	Succeeded by David Carnegie
