= William Cranstoun, 1st Lord Cranstoun =

William Cranstoun, 1st Lord Cranstoun (died June 1627) was a Scottish Lord of Parliament, who played a prominent part in the pacification of the Anglo-Scottish border in the early 17th century.

== Origins ==
Cranstoun was the son of John Cranstoun of Morriestoun and grandson of Cuthbert Cranstoun of Thirlestanemains, belonging to one branch of a prominent Lowland family, whose estates had since at least the 14th century ( been centred on Cranston (or "Cranstoun"), in Midlothian, and Denholm, in the Borders.

The last Cranstoun of Cranstoun – Sir John, who was still alive in June 1609 – left five daughters, of whom William married the second, Sarah. Their contract of marriage was dated December 1580.

== Career ==
King James appointed Cranstoun to the position of Captain of the Horse Garrison, or King's Guard, under the Earl of Dunbar, Lieutenant of the Borders. In 1605 he was keeper of Lochmaben Castle and a deputy-lieutenant of the Borders.

Cranstoun rapidly acquired a reputation for extreme ruthlessness. On one occasion, the inhabitants of Dumfries conspired unsuccessfully to assassinate him and he more than once received blanket pardons or indemnities, holding him harmless in respect of prior atrocities. The summary approach adopted by Lord Dunbar and Cranstoun (hang first and try afterwards) became known as "Jeddart Justice".

In 1608, Cranstoun represented the small barons of Roxburghshire in the Convention of Estates. He was raised to the peerage, as Lord Cranstoun, by patent dated 19 November 1609. In 1611 he was promoted to succeed Lord Dunbar as Lieutenant of the Borders and was appointed to the Privy Council.

Sir John Balfour Paul's The Scots Peerage records of him that:

"He was a man of singular energy and fearlessness, and though his relentless rule on the Borders of necessity made him many enemies, yet his persistence therein brought back that region to a state of law and order such as it had not known for many years, and from which it never really again lapsed."

Cranstoun died in June 1627.

== Family ==
With his wife, Cranstoun had at least seven children:

- John Cranstoun, 2nd Lord Cranstoun (died in or before 1648)
- James Cranstoun (died 1633), who married first Elizabeth Macgill and secondly Elizabeth Stewart, daughter of the Earl of Bothwell, and was banished from the country in August 1610 for challenging the son of Gideon Murray to a duel.
- Henry Cranstoun (died after 1653), who was a colonel of horse for Roxburghshire in 1644 and married Margaret Wauchope
- Thomas Cranstoun
- Agnes Cranstoun
- Elizabeth Cranstoun, who married John Edgar, Younger of Wedderlie
- Barbara (or Janet) Cranstoun, who married (contract 2 November 1615) James Seton, 7th of Touch.

Peerage of Scotland
New creation	Lord Cranstoun; 1609–1627	Succeeded by John Cranstoun
