= Clan Cranstoun =

Scottish clan

- Crest: A crane Proper dormant holding a stone in her claw
- Motto: Thou shalt want ere I want

Profile
- Region: Lowlands
- District: Midlothian

Chief
- David Alexander Somerville Cranstoun of that Ilk and Corehouse
- Seat: Corehouse, Lanarkshire

Clan Cranstoun is a family of the Scottish Lowlands.

== History ==
=== Origins of the clan ===
The name Cranstoun is of territorial origin and comes from the lands and barony of Cranstoun in Midlothian. The lands might have been named after the Anglo-Saxon for place of the crane. A crane being a bird which appears on both the shield and crest of the Clan Cranstoun. It has also been suggested that the lands were named after the dwelling place of the Cran or Cren, which are both Saxon forenames.

Elfrick de Cranstoun witnessed a charter from William the Lion to Holyrood Abbey. In about 1170 Elfrick also appears in a deed between Roger de Quincy and the Abbot of Newbattle. During the reign of Alexander II of Scotland, Thomas de Craystoun is recorded as making a donation of lands to the Church that were near Paiston in East Lothian. This was for the welfare of his soul and those of his ancestors and successors.

In 1296 Hugh de Cranstoun appears on the Ragman Rolls swearing fealty to Edward I of England. In 1338 Randolphus de Cranstoun made a donation to the Abbey of Newbattle. David II of Scotland granted a charter to Thomas de Cranston for all the lands of Cranston.

=== 16th and 17th centuries ===
The Clan Cranstoun prospered up to the late 16th century when they became involved in the volatile political situation of the time. In 1592 Thomas and John Cranstoun, both relatives of the chiefly family were among those accused of treason for assisting Francis Stewart, 5th Earl of Bothwell in his attack on Holyrood Palace.

In June 1600 Sir John Cranstoun of that Ilk was indicted for harbouring traitors who were his kinsmen and only on the intervention of the king did he obtain a stay of the proceedings against him. In August 1600 Sir John's brother, Thomas Cranstoun was executed in Perth for his involvement in the Gowrie Conspiracy, which intended to kidnap James VI of Scotland. However, later in 1609, Sir John Cranstoun of Morristoun who was captain of the Guard to James VI, was raised to the peerage and given the title Lord Cranstoun. At about the same time, William Cranstoun, a staunch Presbyterian who was minister of Kettle in Fife, resisted attempts by the king to bring bishops into the Scottish Church. As a result, the minister fell into disfavour with the authorities and the king's commissioners ordered him to stop preaching but he did not and was formally put to the horn and declared an outlaw.

==== Civil War ====
During the Civil War the third Lord Cranstoun was captured at the Battle of Worcester in 1651. He was kept prisoner in the Tower of London where he languished, and his estates were sequestrated apart from a small portion that his wife and four children were allowed to keep.

=== 18th and 19th centuries ===
William Cranstoun, the fifth Lord Cranstoun sat in the last Scottish Parliament and supported the Treaty of Union. One of his descendants, George Cranstoun, was an eminent lawyer and judge, who became an advocate and Dean of the Faculty of Advocates in 1823. He was also a friend of Walter Scott who he had studied with at the University of Edinburgh.

James Cranstoun, 8th Lord Cranstoun was a distinguished officer of the Royal Navy who commanded HMS Bellerophon (1786) and was involved in a battle where seven British ships defeated an entire French fleet in June 1795. He died of lead poisoning in 1796 and the peerage became extinct in 1813.

=== 20th Century ===
In 1950 Lieutenant Colonel Alastair Cranstoun of Corehouse was recognised as chief of Clan Cranstoun. He died in 1990. The current chief succeeded his uncle, who died with no issue. The family is still predominantly based in Midlothian.

== Clan Chiefs ==
Incomplete List

- Alastair Joseph Edgar Gordon-Cranstoun of that Ilk (11 August 1910 – 28 February 1990)
- David Alexander Somerville Cranstoun of that Ilk and Corehouse (born 19 December 1943)
  - Heir apparent: Alexander John George Cranstoun of that Ilk and Corehouse, younger (born 1995)

== Tartan ==
Tartan image	Notes
	Cranstoun tartan, as published in 1842 in Vestiarium Scoticum.

== See also ==
- Scottish clan
- Lord Cranstoun
