= Lord Cranstoun =

Title in the Peerage of Scotland

Arms of the Lords Cranstoun

Lord Cranstoun was a title in the Peerage of Scotland. It was created on 17 November 1609 for Sir William Cranstoun of that Ilk, sometimes designated 'of Morristoun', Berwickshire. On the death of the eleventh lord, unmarried, in 1869, the peerage became extinct.

== Lords Cranstoun (1609) ==
- William Cranstoun, 1st Lord Cranstoun (d. June 1627)
- John Cranstoun, 2nd Lord Cranstoun (d. 1570–c.1648)
- William Cranstoun, 3rd Lord Cranstoun (d. after July 1664)
- James Cranstoun, 4th Lord Cranstoun (d. between 1685 and 1688)
- William Cranstoun, 5th Lord Cranstoun (d. 1727)
- James Cranstoun, 6th Lord Cranstoun (d. 1773)
- William Cranstoun, 7th Lord Cranstoun (1749–1778)
- James Cranstoun, 8th Lord Cranstoun (1755–1796)
- James Edmund Cranstoun, 9th Lord Cranstoun (1780–1818)
- James Edmund Cranstoun, 10th Lord Cranstoun (1809–1869)
- Charles Frederick Cranstoun, 11th Lord Cranstoun (1813–1869)
