= Robert Carnegie, 13th Earl of Northesk =

The Right Honourable The Earl of Northesk
- Coat of arms of the Earls of Northesk

Member of the House of Lords Lord Temporal
- In office 22 July 1975 – 26 January 1994 as a hereditary peer
- Preceded by: The 12th Earl of Northesk
- Succeeded by: The 14th Earl of Northesk

Personal details
- Born: Robert Andrew Carnegie; 24 June 1926
- Died: 26 January 1994 (aged 67)
- Party: Conservative
- Children: 4, including David
- Parent(s): John Carnegie, 12th Earl of Northesk; Dorothy May Campion
- Occupation: Landowner, farmer, politician and peer

Robert Andrew Carnegie, 13th Earl of Northesk (24 June 1926 – 26 January 1994), was a British landowner, farmer and hereditary peer.

== Early life and education ==
Northesk was the son of John Carnegie, 12th Earl of Northesk and Dorothy May Campion. He was educated at Pangbourne Nautical College and Tabor Academy, Massachusetts. He inherited the earldom upon the death of his father in 1975.

== Later life ==
Northesk served in the Royal Navy from 1942 to 1945. He was an amateur racing driver (racing as "Robin Carnegie") and raced at Le Mans and in the Mille Miglia. In the 1970s he moved to the Isle of Man where he bred Charolais cattle and exported them throughout the world.

== Marriage and children ==
On 20 July 1949, Northesk married Jean Margaret MacRae, daughter of Captain John Duncan George MacRae and Lady Phyllis Hervey, daughter of Frederick Hervey, 4th Marquess of Bristol. They had four children:

- Ian Robert MacRae Carnegie (9 April 1950 – 19 November 1951)
- Lady Karen Jean Carnegie (born 22 December 1951), married Patrick Vavasseur Fisher, 4th Baron Fisher.
- Lady Mary Barbara Carnegie (born 10 February 1953), married William Patrick Stirling Damerell.
- David John MacRae Carnegie, 14th Earl of Northesk (3 November 1954 – 28 March 2010)

== Death ==
Lord Northesk died in 1994 at the age of 67. He was succeeded in the earldom by his younger but only surviving son, David.

Peerage of Scotland
Preceded by John Carnegie	Earl of Northesk; 1975–1994	Succeeded by David Carnegie
