= Patrick Maule, 1st Earl of Panmure =

Scottish courtier and aristocrat

Patrick Maule, 1st Earl of Panmure (1585–1661) was a Scottish courtier and aristocrat.

== Early life ==
Maule was born in 1585. He was a son of Patrick Maule (d. 1605) and Margaret Erskine (d. 1599), a daughter of John Erskine of Dun and Elizabeth Lindsay.

== Career ==
Patrick Maule was a page in the household of James VI and I. At the Union of Crowns in 1603 he accompanied the court to London. He was subsequently appointed a Gentleman of the Bedchamber.

1n 1610 Maule was granted the Barony of Panmure, and lands in Northamptonshire, including Collyweston in 1625. He was made Sheriff Principal of Forfarshire in 1632.

Maule was a Royalist and fought for Charles I at York in 1642. He was a Colonel in the Scottish Army at Oxford in 1646. He was created Earl of Panmure and Lord Maule of Brechin and Navar.

== Personal life ==
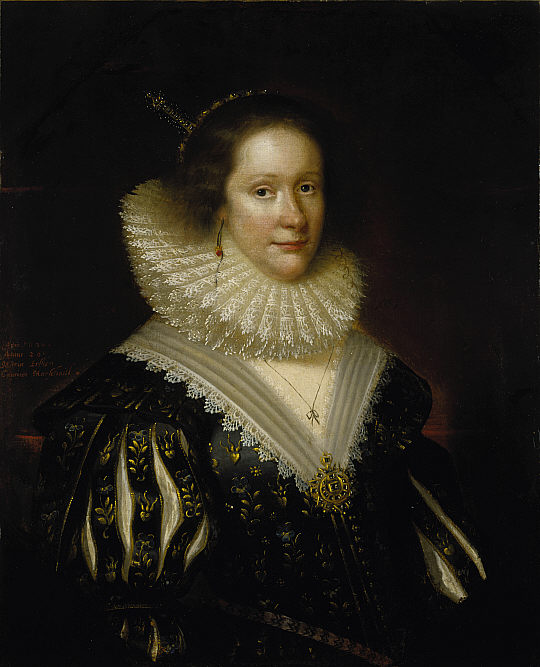
Patrick Maule's third wife, Mary Erskine, Countess Marischal, by George Jamesone

Lord Panmure was married three times. His first wife was Frances Stanhope. Before her death in 1624, they were the parents of:

- George Maule, 2nd Earl of Panmure (1619–1671)
- Lady Elizabeth Maule (1622–1650), who married John Lyon, 2nd Earl of Kinghorne.
- Lady Anna Maule (1618–1623), who died young.
- Lady Jean Maule, who married David Carnegie, 2nd Earl of Northesk.
- Hon. Henry Maule, who married Lady Jean Wemyss, daughter of John Wemyss, 1st Earl of Wemyss.

He married, as his second wife, Mary Waldrum or Waldrone, who was a maid of honour to Henrietta Maria. She died in 1636.

Lord Panmure married, as his third wife, Mary Keith, Countess of Marishcall (née Lady Mary Erskine), a daughter of John Erskine, 2nd Earl of Mar and Marie Erskine, and widow of William Keith, 6th Earl Marischal (who died in 1635). They married at Keith Marischal in East Lothian in July 1639. From her first marriage, she was mother of William Keith, 7th Earl Marischal, George Keith, 8th Earl Marischal, Sir Robert Keith, and John Keith, 1st Earl of Kintore, among others.

Lord Panmure died in 1661 and was buried at Panbride in Angus. He was succeeded by his eldest son, George

Peerage of Scotland
New creation	Earl of Panmure; 1646–1661	Succeeded by George Maule
