= Margaret Wemyss, 3rd Countess of Wemyss =

Scottish peer

The Right Honourable The Countess of Wemyss

Countess of Wemyss
- Coat of arms: Coats of Arm of Clan Wemyss
- Tenure: July 1679 – 11 March 1705 (25 years)
- Predecessor: David Wemyss
- Successor: David Wemyss
- Full name: Lady Marggaret Wemyss
- Other titles: Countess of Cromatie; Lady Elcho; Lady Methil; Lady Burntisland; Viscountess Tarbat
- Born: 1 January 1659; Kingdom of Scotland
- Died: 11 March 1705 (aged 46)
- Noble family: Wemyss; Mackenzie (second marriage)
- Spouses: James Wemyss, Lord Burntisland (1672–1682) George Mackenzie, 1st Earl of Cromartie (1700–1705)
- Issue: Anna Wemyss, Countess of Leven; Margaret Wemyss, Countess of Northesk; David Wemyss, 4th Earl of Wemyss
- Father: David Wemyss, 2nd Earl of Wemyss
- Mother: Margaret Leslie

Margaret Wemyss, 3rd Countess of Wemyss and Countess of Cromarty (1 January 1659 – 11 March 1705) was a Scottish peer.

Margaret was the daughter of David Wemyss, 2nd Earl of Wemyss and Margaret Leslie, daughter of John Leslie, 6th Earl of Rothes. She was the youngest of sixteen children; she and her older sister, Lady Jean Wemyss (a half-sister by her father's first wife), were the only ones who did not die young and childless. Normally the family's titles would have gone to the older daughter but "owing to special circumstance", Margaret was preferred over Jean. Jean Wemyss disputed this and the case was discussed before the Scottish Parliament, where Margaret prevailed. She succeeded to the family title in 1679.

On 28 March 1672 at age 13, Margaret married her cousin, Sir James Weymss of Caskieberry (later created Lord Burntisland for life) and they had three surviving children:

- Lady Anna (18 October 1675 – 1702), married David Melville, 3rd Earl of Leven.
- Lady Margaret (1 April 1677 – 29 March 1763), married David Carnegie, 4th Earl of Northesk.
- David, later 4th Earl of Wemyss (1678–1720).

After Lord Burntisland died in 1682, the Countess married Sir George Mackenzie of Tarbat (later created Earl of Cromartie).

Peerage of Scotland
Preceded by David Wemyss	Countess of Wemyss; 1679–1705	Succeeded by David Wemyss
