= James Cranstoun, 8th Lord Cranstoun =

Captain The Right Honourable The Lord Cranstoun
- Born: c. 1755
- Died: 22 September 1796; Bishop's Waltham
- Burial place: Royal Garrison Church, Portsmouth
- Spouse: Elizabeth Montolieu
- Military career
- Allegiance: Kingdom of Great Britain
- Branch: Royal Navy
- Service years: c. 1776–1796
- Rank: Captain
- Commands: HMS Renard; HMS Saint Eustatius; HMS Belliqueux; HMS Formidable; HMS Grampus; HMS Assistance; HMS Raisonnable; HMS Bellerophon
- Conflicts: American Revolutionary War; Battle of Saint Kitts; Battle of the Saintes; French Revolutionary War; First Battle of Groix

Captain James Cranstoun, 8th Lord Cranstoun (c. 1755–22 September 1796) was an officer of the Royal Navy.

The third son of James Cranstoun, 6th Lord Cranstoun, he succeeded to the title on 1 August 1778 on the death of his elder brother William Cranstoun, 7th Lord Cranstoun.

Cranstoun reached the rank of Lieutenant on 19 October 1776 and Captain on 31 January 1780. He commanded HMS Belliqueux at the Battle of St. Kitts in January 1782 and after the Battle of the Saintes in April was sent home with the despatches (in which he was mentioned) bearing news of the victory. From 1791 to 1793 he was Captain in HMS Assistance and in 1795 commanded HMS Bellerophon under Admiral Cornwallis at the First Battle of Groix.

He was appointed Governor of Grenada in 1796 but before taking up his appointment he died at Bishop's Waltham on 22 September that year, as a result of lead poisoning in cider. He was buried at the Royal Garrison Church, Portsmouth.

Lord Cranstoun was married on 19 August 1792 to Elizabeth, youngest daughter of Lieutenant-Colonel Lewis Charles Montolieu and sister-in-law of Alexander Murray, 8th Lord Elibank and of James Bland Burges (later Sir James Bland Lamb, 1st Baronet). They had no children, so the title passed to Lord Cranstoun's nephew. Lady Cranstoun died on 27 August 1797, aged twenty-seven.

== Sources ==
- William Anderson, The Scottish Nation, vol. i, Edinburgh 1862

Peerage of Scotland
Preceded by William Cranstoun	Lord Cranstoun; 1778–1796	Succeeded by James Cranstoun
