= Robert Carnegie, Lord Kinnaird =

Scottish landowner, diplomat, judge and Senator of the College of Justice

Sir Robert Carnegie, Lord Kinnaird, 5th Laird of Kinnaird (c.1490–1566) was a 16th-century Scottish landowner, diplomat, judge and Senator of the College of Justice.

== Life ==
He was born at Kinnaird Castle near Brechin around 1490, the son of John Carnegie and his wife Euphame Strachan. His father was killed at the Battle of Flodden (9 September 1513) and his mother died a month after (possibly grief-stricken). Robert inherited Kinnaird Castle at this point and extended it with a kitchen and servants wing around 1520.

In July 1547 he was elected a Senator of the College of Justice and took the title Lord Kinnaird. He replaced Henry Balnaves who was removed due to suspicion of complicity in the murder of Cardinal Beaton.

In the autumn of 1548 Carnegie was the diplomat, sent with an armed guard, to deliver the ransom for the George Gordon, 4th Earl of Huntly who had been captured at the Battle of Pinkie Cleugh and was held in the Tower of London. After leaving London he went to Blois in France with Archbishop Gavin Hamilton and the David Panter, Bishop of Ross to create the Regent Duke of Chatelherault. After two years in France he returned to Scotland in the summer of 1551.

Robert Carnegie was clerk of the treasury in 1549. He was knighted sometime after 1551 and prior to 1554 (as he then appears as "Sir Robert Carnegie”).

=== Diplomat ===
He was involved with other law lords in the debates over the Scottish-English border and especially the issue of who should have Berwick-upon-Tweed. In 1553, when Mary of Guise became Regent, he was appointed Clerk to the Treasurer. Later that year, he was re-appointed, along with Sir Robert Bellenden, to the task of settling legal issues relating to the border. Carnegie was sent to present Border complaints to Mary I of England. He joined with the French ambassador, François de Noailles, in London, which added to English irritation.

Carnegie next attended a meeting at Carlisle with James MacGill of Nether Rankeillour, the Earl of Cassilis, and the Bishop of Orkney, with an English delegation including the Bishop of Durham and the Earl of Westmorland. This long-winded negotiation resulted in an initial agreement in December 1557.

=== Death ===
His final appearance as a member of the Privy Council appears in December 1565.

He died in January or February 1566. The marriage contract of James Hepburn, 4th Earl of Bothwell and Jean Gordon made in February 1566 mentions his decease. He was buried in the parish churchyard at Leuchars in central Fife. An inscription placed at his tomb states that he died at Leuchars Castle.

== Family ==
He was married to Margaret Guthrie of the Guthries of Lunan. They were parents to Sir John Carnegie (d.1595) and at least 12 other children including David Carnegie of Colluthie and Helen Carnegie whose third husband John Gordon built Glenbuchat Castle.
