= George Carnegie, 9th Earl of Northesk =

British noble (1843–1891)

Arms of the 7th to 9th Earls of Northesk

Lieutenant-Colonel George John Carnegie, 9th Earl of Northesk DL (1843 – 1891) was a British nobleman and soldier.

== Early life ==
He was born the son of William Carnegie, 8th Earl of Northesk and Georgiana Maria Elliot on 1 December 1843.

== Career ==
Lord Rosehill, as he then was, was commissioned into the 1st Dragoons in 1862, but transferred to the Scots Fusilier Guards as a lieutenant later the same year. He was promoted captain in 1866 and lieutenant-colonel in 1873. He retired in 1874.

== Personal life ==
He married Elizabeth Georgina Frances Elliot, daughter of Admiral Sir George Elliot and Hersey Susan Sydney Wauchope, on 28 February 1865 and had four children.

- Helen Alice Carnegie (died 1908), who married barrister Sir Francis Lacey in 1890.
- David John Carnegie, 10th Earl of Northesk (1865–1921), who married Elizabeth Boyle Hallowes, eldest daughter of Maj.-Gen. George Skene Hallowes, in 1894.
- Lt.-Col. Hon. Douglas George Carnegie (1870–1937), who married Margaret Jean Johnstone-Douglas, second daughter of Arthur Johnstone-Douglas of Lockerbie, in 1894.
- Lt. Ian Ludovic Andrew Carnegie (1881–1909), who married Anna Barbara Atkinson, youngest daughter of Col. Bradford Atkinson, in 1905. After his death, she married Capt. Reginald Dalrymple.

He rebuilt Longwood House, Hampshire, his main home. The architect was George Devey. He died on 9 September 1891 at age 47.

Peerage of Scotland
Preceded by William Carnegie	Earl of Northesk; 1878–1891	Succeeded by David Carnegie
