= Duke of Fife =

Title in the Peerage of the United Kingdom

Dukedom of Fife
- Arms: Or, a Lion rampant Gules, armed and langued Azure (the Dukedom of Fife), and on an Inescutcheon Argent, ensigned of an Earl's Coronet proper, an Eagle displayed Azure, armed, beaked and membered Gules, and charged on its breast with an Antique Covered Cup Or (Carnegie). Crest: A Thunderbolt proper, winged Or. Supporters: Dexter: a Lion guardant Gules, langued Azure, collared with a Label of five-points Argent, charged with two Thistles proper, between three Crosses of St George Gules. Sinister: a Talbot Argent, collared and langued Gules. Mottoes: Above the crest, on a Scroll DRED GOD; beneath the shield DEO JUVANTE ("God helping").
- Creation date: 24 April 1900
- Creation: Second
- Created by: Queen Victoria
- Peerage: Peerage of the United Kingdom
- First holder: Alexander Duff, 1st Earl of Fife and 6th Earl Fife
- Present holder: David Carnegie, 4th Duke
- Heir apparent: Charles Carnegie, Earl of Southesk
- Remainder to: 1st Duke's daughters by Princess Louise and the heirs male of their bodies lawfully begotten
- Subsidiary titles: Marquess of Macduff †; Earl of Southesk; Earl Fife †; Earl of Fife †; Earl of Macduff; Viscount Macduff †; Lord Carnegie of Kinnard; Lord Carnegie; Baron Balinhard; Baron Braco †; Baron Skene †
- Seats: Elsick House; Kinnaird Castle
- Former seat: Mar Lodge

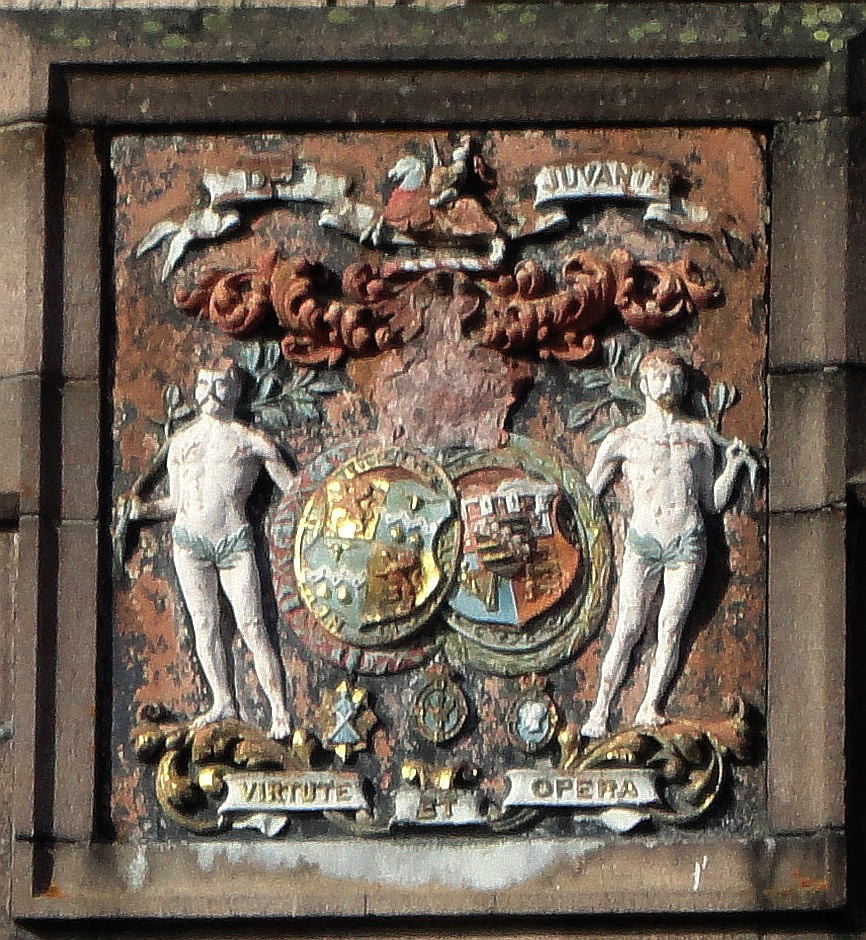
Fife Arms Hotel, Braemar: Arms of the 1st Duke and Duchess of Fife

Duke of Fife is a title in the Peerage of the United Kingdom that has been created twice, in both cases for Alexander Duff, 1st Earl of Fife and 6th Earl Fife. In 1889, Lord Fife married Princess Louise, the eldest daughter of Albert Edward, Prince of Wales (later King Edward VII) and a granddaughter of Queen Victoria.

== History ==
Alexander Duff (1849–1912) was the eldest son of the 5th Earl Fife (1814–1879). Upon his father's death on 7 August 1879, he succeeded as the 6th Earl Fife. With this, he inherited the titles Baron Braco (created in 1735), Earl Fife and Viscount Macduff (both created in 1759), all in the Peerage of Ireland (and created for Scottish nobleman William Duff), and Baron Skene in the Peerage of the United Kingdom (created in 1857 for his father the 5th Earl Fife; a title which gave him a seat in the House of Lords). In 1885, Queen Victoria created for Alexander Duff the title Earl of Fife in the Peerage of the United Kingdom.

On Saturday, 27 July 1889, Alexander Duff, 1st Earl of Fife and 6th Earl Fife, married Princess Louise, the third child and eldest daughter of the then-Prince of Wales (the future King Edward VII) and his wife Princess Alexandra, in the Private Chapel at Buckingham Palace. The couple were third cousins in descent from King George III. The wedding marked the second time a descendant of Queen Victoria married a British subject. Two days after the wedding, the Queen elevated Lord Fife to the dignities of Marquess of Macduff, in the County of Banff, and Duke of Fife, both in the Peerage of the United Kingdom. The Letters Patent of 29 June 1889 creating these titles contained the standard remainder to "heirs male of his body".

On 24 April 1900, Queen Victoria issued new letters patent by which she created for the 1st Duke of Fife the further dignities of Duke of Fife and Earl of Macduff, both in the Peerage of the United Kingdom. Both of these titles came with a special remainder that allowed the titles to pass to his daughters by Princess Louise, in default of a son, and then to the male heirs of those daughters. On 9 November 1905, King Edward VII granted to the 1st Duke of Fife's two daughters, Lady Alexandra (1891–1959) and Lady Maud (1893–1945), the styles of Highness and Princess.

Upon the death of the 1st Duke of Fife in January 1912, the peerages created in 1889 (the dukedom of Fife of 1889 and the marquessate of Macduff) and all the older (as previously mentioned) peerages held by the Duff family (the barony of Braco of 1735, viscountcy of Macduff of 1759, earldom Fife of 1759, barony of Skene of 1857, earldom of Fife of 1885) became extinct, while the peerages created in 1900 (the dukedom of Fife of 1900 and the earldom of Macduff) passed to his elder daughter, Princess Alexandra.

On 15 October 1913, the 2nd Duchess of Fife married Prince Arthur of Connaught, the only son of Prince Arthur, Duke of Connaught and Strathearn, third son of Queen Victoria and Prince Albert and thus a younger brother of her maternal grandfather King Edward VII. As such, Arthur and Alexandra were first cousins once removed. Their only son, Alastair, died in 1943.

When the 2nd Duchess of Fife died in 1959, her hereditary peerages passed to her nephew James Carnegie (1929–2015), eldest son of her sister Maud and the latter's husband Charles Carnegie, 11th Earl of Southesk (1893–1992). Thirty-three years later, in 1992, the 3rd Duke of Fife succeeded his father as the 12th Earl of Southesk and chief of Clan Carnegie. As a consequence, the following peerage titles became subsidiary to the dukedom: Lord Carnegie of Kinnaird in the Peerage of Scotland (created in 1616), Earl of Southesk and Lord Carnegie in the Peerage of Scotland (both created in 1633), Baron Balinhard in the Peerage of the United Kingdom (created in 1869; all previous mentioned titles awarded to Sir David Carnegie (1575–1658), an Extraordinary Lord of Session), and the Carnegie Baronetcy in the Baronetage of Nova Scotia (created in 1641 for David Carnegie of Pitcarrow (died 1708), a Scottish politician). Upon his death in 2015, he was succeeded in the Fife and Carnegie titles by his son, David Charles Carnegie (born 1961). The 4th Duke of Fife's heir apparent is his son Charles Duff Carnegie (born 1989), who uses the courtesy title Earl of Southesk. The hypothetical grandson of the duke and heir-to-heir apparent would be styled instead Lord Carnegie.

== Tartan ==
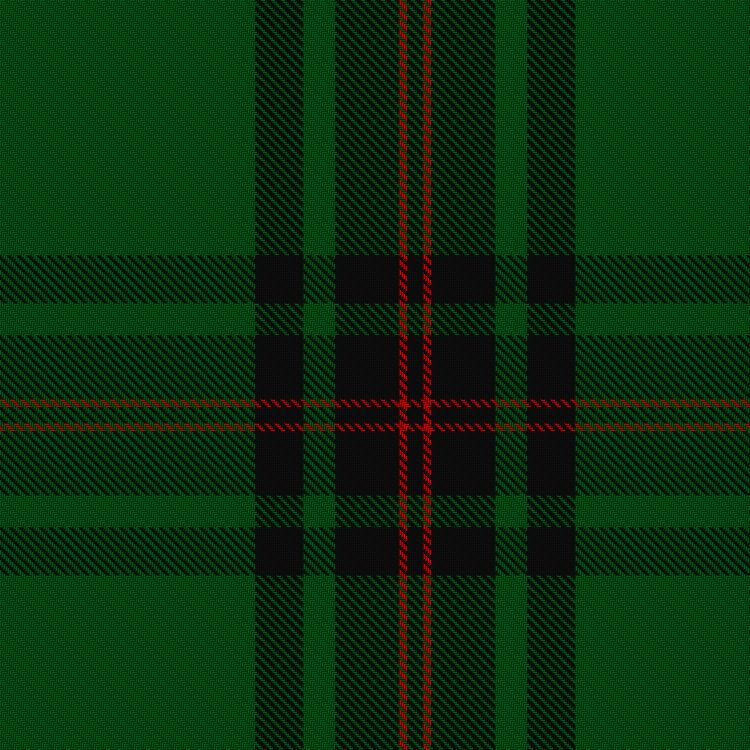
The Duke of Fife tartan

The Duke of Fife tartan, first designed to celebrate the marriage of Louise, daughter of Edward VII, to Alexander Duff, 1st Duke of Fife.

== Estates and residences ==
=== Country seat ===
The current Duke of Fife's main residence is Kinnaird Castle near the town of Brechin in Angus, Scotland. Another seat is Elsick House near the town of Stonehaven in Aberdeenshire, Scotland, within the watershed of the Burn of Elsick.

=== Former residences and estates ===
Mar Lodge, the 1st Duke of Fife's residence to the west of Braemar in Aberdeenshire, was bequeathed by the 2nd Duchess to her nephew Alexander Ramsay of Mar, and subsequently sold. The first two holders of the dukedom are buried in St Ninian's Chapel, Braemar.

In the 1883 edition of John Bateman's The Great Landowners of Great Britain and Ireland, Alexander Duff, 6th Earl Fife (later 1st Duke of Fife) was recorded as owning 249,220 acres across Scotland, including 135,829 acres in Aberdeenshire, 72,432 acres in Banffshire, and 40,959 acres in Elginshire. Bateman additionally recorded property in Elgin producing £1,251 annually, for which no acreage was stated; the estates and other property produced a combined annual income of £72,563.

=== London residences ===
In the months prior to his wedding to Princess Louise of Wales, Lord Fife purchased the lease of a London townhouse at No. 15 Portman Square, London in July 1889, which served as his London residence until his death in 1912; his widow Princess Louise continued to use the property as her London home until her own death in 1931, following which a large auction of the contents of the house was held in February 1932. The house, along with neighbouring properties at 16-18 Portman Square were demolished in 1935, and a large apartment building was constructed in their place by May 1936.

The first Duke's successor Princess Alexandra, 2nd Duchess of Fife initially maintained a London residence at 54 Mount Street, Mayfair following her marriage to her cousin Prince Arthur of Connaught in 1913; the Prince had reportedly leased from Robert Windsor-Clive, 1st Earl of Plymouth, and house continued to be their London home until September 1916, when they took a new London residence at No. 17 Hill Street, Mayfair. By January 1920 Prince Arthur and Princess Alexandra were residing at No. 42 Upper Grosvenor Street, Mayfair. Later in the same year they moved to 41 Belgrave Square, which Prince Arthur had reportedly purchased in 1920. Following Prince Arthur's death in 1938 41 Belgrave Square was sold to Mrs Edward Baron in 1939.

In November 1938 Princess Alexandra purchased a newly-built house at 64 Avenue Road, St John's Wood, London, where she continued to live until her death in 1959.

== Duke of Fife (1889–1912) ==
Created by Queen Victoria
#	Name	Period	Spouse	Notes	Other titles	Coat of arms
1	Alexander William George Duff (1849–1912)	1889–1912	Louise, Princess Royal	Grandson-in-law of Queen Victoria	1st Marquess of Macduff, 1st Earl of Fife, 6th Earl Fife, 6th Viscount Macduff, 6th Baron Braco, 2nd Baron Skene	

== Dukes of Fife (1900–present) ==
Created by Queen Victoria
#	Name	Period	Spouse	Notes	Other titles	Coat of arms
1	Alexander William George Duff (1849–1912)	1900–1912	Louise, Princess Royal	Grandson-in-law of Queen Victoria	all titles associated with dukedom of Fife (1889) plus 1st Earl of Macduff (1900)	
2	Princess Alexandra Victoria Alberta Edwina Louise (1891–1959)	1912–1959	Prince Arthur of Connaught	Granddaughter of King Edward VII and daughter of the 1st Duke	Countess of Macduff	
3	James George Alexander Bannerman Carnegie (1929–2015)	1959–2015	The Hon. Caroline Dewar divorced	Nephew of the 2nd Duchess	Earl of Southesk, Earl of Macduff, Lord Carnegie of Kinnaird, Lord Carnegie of Kinnaird and Leuchars, Baron Balinhard, Baronet 'of PitCarrow'	
4	David Charles Carnegie (born 1961)	from 2015	Caroline Anne Bunting	Only surviving son of the 3rd Duke	Earl of Southesk, Earl of Macduff, Lord Carnegie of Kinnaird, Lord Carnegie of Kinnaird and Leuchars, Baron Balinhard, Baronet 'of PitCarrow'	

== Line of succession ==
- Alexander Duff, 1st Duke of Fife (1849-1912)
  - Princess Alexandra, 2nd Duchess of Fife (1891-1959)
    - Alastair Windsor, 2nd Duke of Connaught and Strathearn (1914-1943)
  - Maud Carnegie, Countess of Southesk (1893-1945)
    - James Carnegie, 3rd Duke of Fife (1929-2015)
      - David Carnegie, 4th Duke of Fife (b. 1961)
        - (1) Charles Carnegie, Earl of Southesk (b. 1989)
        - (2) Lord George Carnegie (b. 1991)
        - (3) Lord Hugh Carnegie (b. 1993)

== Family trees ==
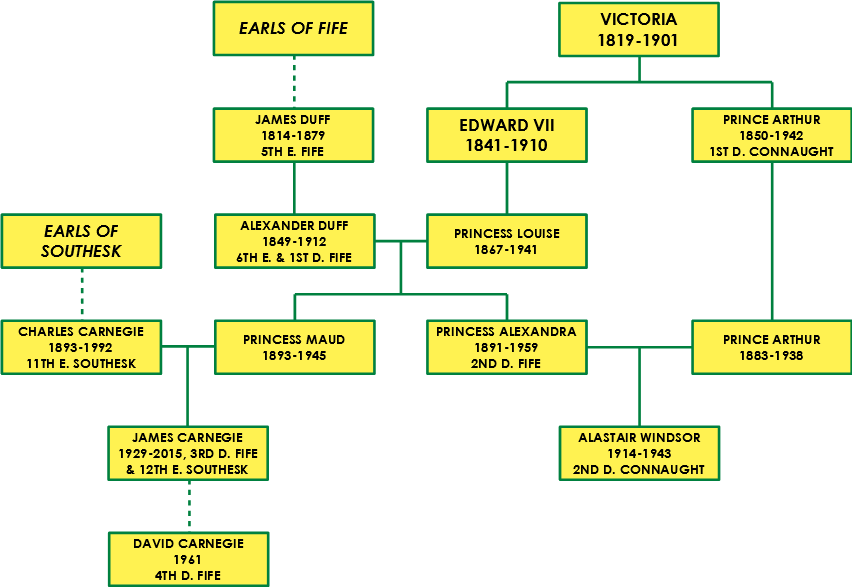
Family tree showing the interrelation of the dukedom of Connaught & Strathearn with the dukedom of Fife

Family tree: Earls of Fife, Dukes of Fife, Earls of Southesk and Earls of Northesk

(Mormaers) Earls of Fife (Scot)
Donnchad (Duncan) I 1113–1154; Earl of Fife
Donnchad (Duncan/Dunecan) II d. 1204; Earl of Fife
Máel Coluim (Maol Choluim, Malcolm) I 1204–1228; Earl of Fife	Donnchadh
Máel Coluim (Malcolm) II c. Early 13th century–1266 Earl of Fife
Colban c. 1247–1253–1270/1272; Earl of Fife
Donnchadh (Duncan) III; 1270/1272–1288; Earl of Fife
Robert II of Scotland; 1316–1390; King of Scotland	Donnchadh (Duncan) IV; 1289–1353; Earl of Fife
Robert III of Scotland c. 1337–1406; King of Scotland	m1. Walter Stewart c. 1338–1362; Earl of Fife jure uxoris	Isabella MacDuff c. 1320–1389; Countess of Fife suo jure	Robert Stewart c. 1340–1420; Duke of Albany, Earl of Fife, Earl of Menteith, Earl of Buchan, Earl of Atholl	m2. Thomas Bisset d. 1366; Earl of Fife jure uxoris	m3. John Dunbar d. before 1371; Earl of Fife jure uxoris
Murdoch Stewart; 1362–1425; Earl of Fife; Duke of Albany
David Carnegie of Colluthie; 1559–1598
Earl of Southesk, 1633
David Carnegie; 1575–1658; 1st Earl of Southesk
Earl of Northesk, 1662
John Carnegie; 1611–1667; 1st Earl of Northesk
James Carnegie before 1583–1669; 2nd Earl of Southesk	Alexander Carnegie d. 1681/82	David Carnegie d. 1669; 2nd Earl of Northesk
Robert Carnegie before 1649–1688; 3rd Earl of Southesk	David Carnegie d. 1708; 1st Baronet	David Carnegie; 1643–1688; 3rd Earl of Northesk	Patrick Carnegie of Lour after 1643–1743
Charles Carnegie; 1661–1699; 4th Earl of Southesk	James Carnegie; 1673–1729; 2nd Baronet	David Carnegie; 1675–1729; 4th Earl of Northesk	Patrick Carnegie of Lour; 1684–1729
Viscount Macduff and Baron Braco, 1735; Earl Fife, 1759
William Duff; 1697–1763; 1st Earl Fife, etc.	James Carnegie; 1692–1730; 5th Earl of Southesk	James Carnegie; 1716–1765 de jure 6th Earl of Southesk	David Carnegie; 1701–1741; 5th Earl of Northesk	George Carnegie; 1716–1792; 6th Earl of Northesk	Patrick Carnegie of Lour; 1720–1799
Earldom of Southesk attainted, 1716
Baron Fife (GB), 1790
James Duff; 1729–1809; 2nd Earl Fife, etc., Baron Fife (GB)	Alexander Duff; 1731–1811; 3rd Earl Fife, etc.	David Carnegie; 1753–1805 de jure 7th Earl of Southesk	William Carnegie; 1756–1831; 7th Earl of Northesk	Patrick Carnegie of Lour; 1757–1819
Baron Fife (GB) extinct, 1809
Baron Fife (UK), 1827
James Duff; 1776–1857; 4th Earl Fife, etc., Baron Fife (UK)	Alexander Duff; 1777–1851	James Carnegie; 1799–1849 de jure 8th Earl of Southesk	William Hopetoun Carnegie; 1794–1878; 8th Earl of Northesk	Alexander Carnegie; 1793–1862
Baron Fife (UK) extinct, 1809
Baron Skene, 1857	Southesk attainder reversed, 1855
Queen Victoria; 1819–1901	James Duff; 1814–1879; 5th Earl Fife, etc., 1st Baron Skene	James Carnegie; 1827–1905; 9th Earl of Southesk	Alexander Carnegie; 1829–1900
King Edward VII; 1841–1910	Prince Arthur; 1850–1942; Duke of Connaught and Strathearn	George John Carnegie; 1843–1891; 9th Earl of Northesk
Earl of Fife, 1885; Duke of Fife (Scotland), 1889; Duke of Fife (UK), Marquess of Macduff, and Earl of Macduff, 1900
King George V 1865–1936	Louise, Princess Royal; 1867–1931; Duchess of Fife	Alexander William George Duff; 1849–1912; 1st Duke of Fife (Scot) and Earl of Fife, 1st Duke of Fife (UK) and Earl of Macduff, Marquess of Macduff; 6th Earl Fife, etc., 2nd Baron Skene	Charles Noel Carnegie; 1854–1941; 10th Earl of Southesk	David John Carnegie; 1865–1921; 10th Earl of Northesk	Douglas George Carnegie; 1870–1937	Charles Carnegie; 1864–1928
Dukedom of Fife (Scot), Marquess of Macduff, Earldom Fife (1759), Viscountcy of Macduff, and Baronies of Braco and Skene extinct, 1912
Prince Arthur of Connaught; 1883–1938	Princess Alexandra; 1891–1959; 2nd Duchess of Fife (UK), etc. suo jure	Maud Carnegie; 1893–1945; Countess of Southesk	Charles Alexander Bannerman Carnegie; 1893–1992; 11th Earl of Southesk	David Ludovic George Hopetoun Carnegie; 1901–1963; 11th Earl of Northesk	John Douglas Carnegie; 1895–1975; 12th Earl of Northesk	Patrick Carnegy; 1893–1969
Prince Alastair Arthur (later Alistair Windsor); 1914–1943; Duke of Connaught and Strathearn	James George Alexander Bannerman Carnegie; 1929–2015; 3rd Duke of Fife, etc., 12th Earl of Southesk	Robert Andrew Carnegie; 1926–1994; 13th Earl of Northesk	Patrick Charles Carnegy b. 1940; 15th Earl of Northesk	Colin Carnegy b. 1942
Heir presumptive to the Earldom of Northesk
David Charles Carnegie b. 1961; 4th Duke of Fife, etc., 13th Earl of Southesk	David John MacRae Carnegie; 1954–2010; 14th Earl of Northesk
Charles Carnegie b. 1989 styled Earl of Southesk	George Carnegie b. 1991	Hugh Carnegie b. 1993
Heir apparent

== See also ==
- Duchess of Fife
