= Charles Carnegie, 10th Earl of Southesk =

Scottish nobleman

The Right Honourable The Earl of Southesk JP DL

Personal details
- Born: Charles Noel Carnegie; 20 March 1854
- Died: 10 November 1941 (aged 87) Kinnaird Castle, Angus, Scotland
- Spouse: Ethel Mary Elizabeth Bannerman (after 1891)
- Children: 5, including Charles
- Parent(s): James Carnegie, 9th Earl of Southesk; Lady Catherine Hamilton Noel
- Relatives: Lancelot Carnegie (half-brother); David Carnegie (half-brother); James Carnegie, 3rd Duke of Fife (grandson)
- Education: Harrow School
- Alma mater: University of St Andrews

Charles Noel Carnegie, 10th Earl of Southesk JP DL (20 March 1854 – 10 November 1941), was a Scottish nobleman.

== Early life ==
Carnegie was the son of the explorer and poet James Carnegie, 9th Earl of Southesk and his first wife Catherine Hamilton Noel, daughter of the Charles Noel, 1st Earl of Gainsborough. He had three older sisters, Lady Arabella Charlotte (wife of Samuel Romilly), Lady Constance Mary (wife of Victor Bruce, 9th Earl of Elgin) and Lady Beatrice Diana Cecilia Diana Cecillia (wife of the Rev. Henry Holmes Stewart). After his mother's death in 1855 at the age of twenty-six, his father remarried to Lady Susan Catherine Mary Murray (eldest daughter of the 6th Earl of Dunmore) in 1860. From his father's second marriage, he had seven younger half-siblings, including: Sir Lancelot Douglas Carnegie, Lady Dora Susan (wife of Maj. Ernest de Rodakowski-Rivers), Lady Elizabeth Erica, Lady Helena Mariota, Lady Katherine Agnes Blanche (wife of Courtenay Morgan, 1st Viscount Tredegar), Hon. Robert Francis (who married Violet Fraser), and Hon. David Wynford Carnegie.

His paternal grandparents were Sir James Carnegie, 5th Baronet (de jure 8th Earl of Southesk) and the former Charlotte Lysons (a daughter of the Reverend Daniel Lysons).

He was educated at Harrow and St Andrews University, and would later receive an honorary degree from the university in October 1902.

== Career ==
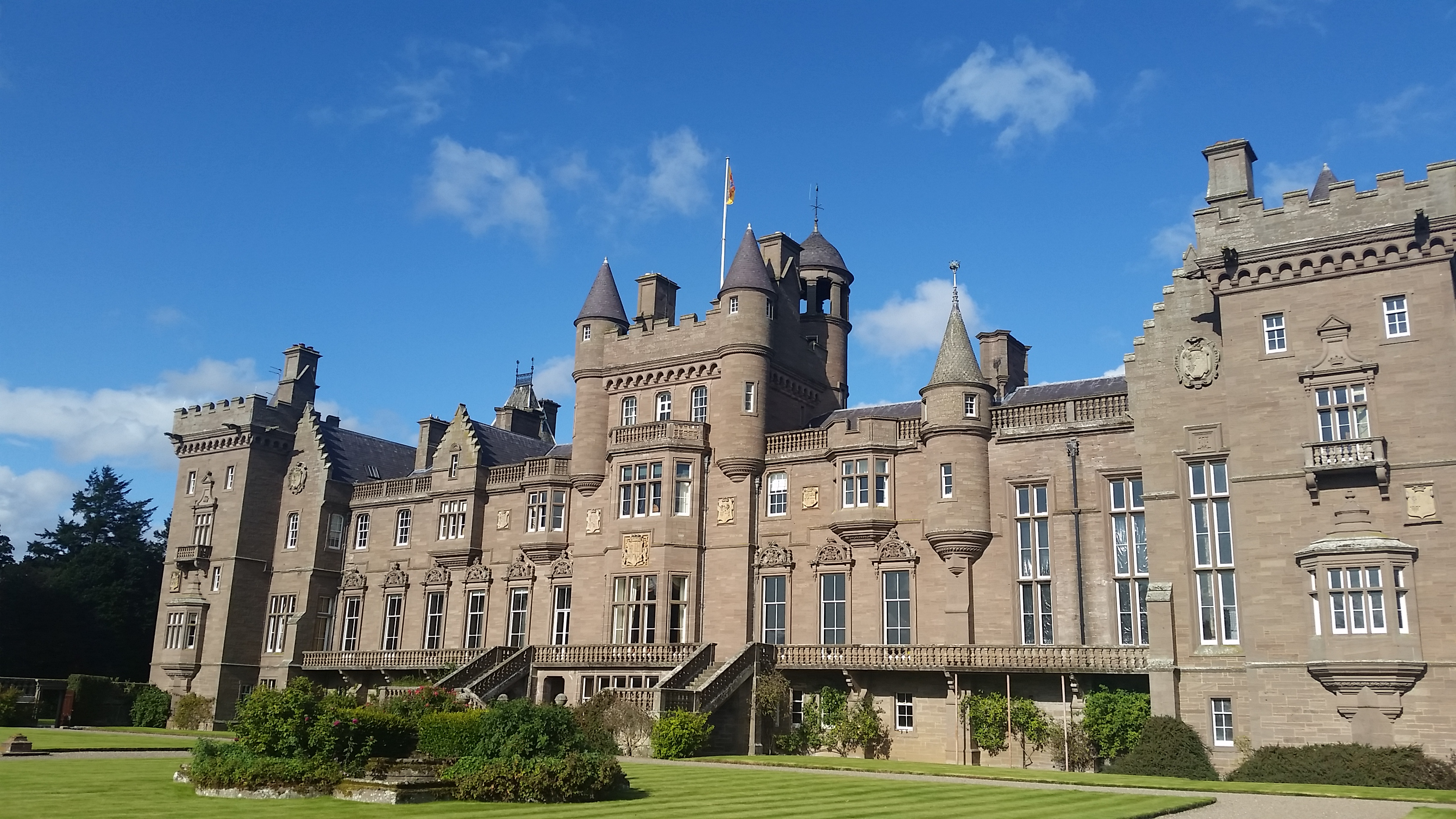
Kinnaird Castle, 2018

Amongst his various offices, he was commissioned as a Lieutenant in the part-time Forfar and Kincardine Artillery Militia in 1872 and steadily progressed through the officer ranks until he became the Lieutenant-Colonel Commandant in 1894, with the honorary rank of Colonel. He retired from the command in 1906. He also served as a Deputy Lieutenant for Angus, Aberdeenshire, and Kincardineshire from 5 January 1900. He held the office of Justice of the Peace for Aberdeenshire and for Angus. In 1905, he succeeded his father as the 10th Earl of Southesk who had restored the family titles, with the original precedence, by reversal of the 1715 Act of Attainder in 1855.

He had the reputation of being the best game shot in Scotland.

In 1921, Kinnaird Castle, which was situated in one of the grandest Scottish glens and was the seat of the Earls of Southesk for more than 600 years, burnt to the ground. "Only a small part of the servant's wing has escaped. A considerable part of the library was saved, but many books impossible to replace, as well as Raeburn's portrait of Lady Carnegie, valued at £10,000, were lost." Lord Southesk rebuilt the castle. A prominent art collector, he owned "a large collection of paintings by old masters and antique gems."

== Personal life ==
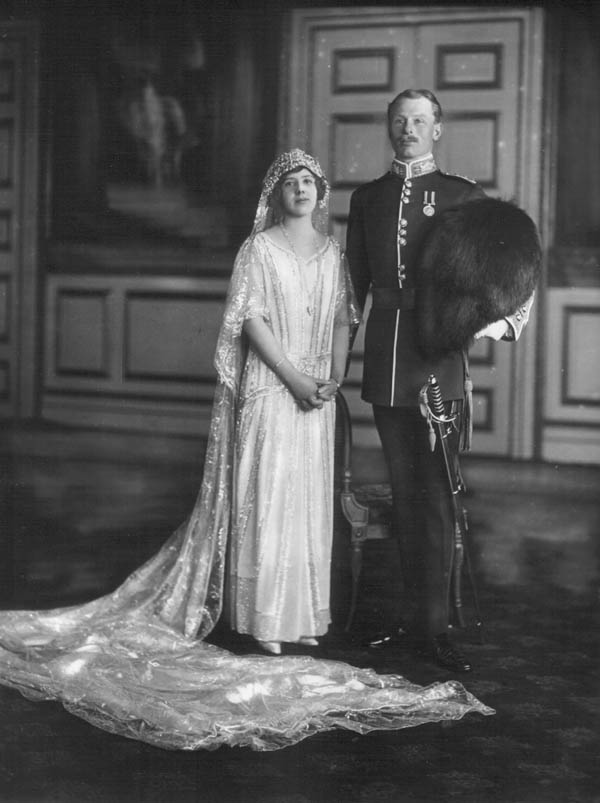
His eldest son Charles, and Princess Maud on their wedding day in 1923

On 1 August 1891, he was married to Ethel Mary Elizabeth Bannerman, the only child of Sir Alexander Bannerman, 9th Baronet and Lady Arabella Diana Sackville-West (the youngest daughter of Lord Chamberlain George Sackville-West, 5th Earl De La Warr and Elizabeth Sackville-West, Countess De La Warr). Together, they had five children, three sons and two daughters:

- Lady Katherine Ethel Carnegie (b. 1892), who married Maj. Arthur Rivers Bosanquet MC (1890–1971), eldest son and heir of Richard Arthur Bosanquet and Ruth Rivers Thompson (eldest daughter of Sir Augustus Rivers Thompson, Lieutenant-Governor of Bengal), in 1917. They divorced in 1940.
- Charles Alexander Carnegie, 11th Earl of Southesk (1893–1992), who married Princess Maud Alexandra Victoria Georgina Bertha of Fife, second daughter of Alexander Duff, 1st Duke of Fife and Louise, Princess Royal, eldest daughter of King Edward VII, in 1923.
- Hon. Alexander Bannerman Carnegie (1894–1989), a Commander in the Royal Navy who married his cousin Susan Ottilia de Rodakowski-Rivers (d. 1968), a daughter of Maj. Ernest de Rodakowski-Rivers and Lady Dora Susan Carnegie (eldest daughter by his second wife of James Carnegie, 9th Earl of Southesk), in 1919. After her death, he married Cynthia Averil Gurney, the former wife of Capt. Alexander Hugh Gurney and eldest daughter of Brig. Harold Vincent Spencer Charrington of Winchfield House, in 1969.
- Lady Mary Elizabeth Carnegie (1899–1996), who married Vice-Admiral Conolly Abel Smith, second son of Eustace Abel Smith of Longhills and the former Ailleen Geta Catherine Connolly (eldest daughter of Col. John Augustus Connolly VC), in 1932.
- Hon. James Duthac Carnegie (1910–1996), a Maj. in the British Army who married Claudia Katharine Angela Blackburn (d. 2001), the youngest daughter of Robert Blackburn, Lord Blackburn a Lord of Session and Lady Constance Frances Bowes-Lyon (eldest daughter of Claude Bowes-Lyon, 13th Earl of Strathmore and Kinghorne), in 1935. Through her uncle, Claude Bowes-Lyon, 14th Earl of Strathmore and Kinghorne, Claudia was a first cousin of Queen Elizabeth The Queen Mother (the mother of Queen Elizabeth II).

Lord Southesk died on 10 November 1941 at Kinnaird Castle near Brechin, County Angus. Lady Southesk died on 10 December 1947.

=== Descendants ===
Through his eldest son, he was a grandfather of James George Alexander Bannerman Carnegie, who succeeded his maternal aunt, Princess Arthur of Connaught, suo jure Duchess of Fife, as the 3rd Duke of Fife in the Peerage of the United Kingdom in 1959 because her only child, Alastair, 2nd Duke of Connaught and Strathearn, had predeceased her. In 1992, the Duke became the 12th Earl of Southesk in the Peerage of Scotland.

== In popular culture ==
He and his wife are briefly mentioned in the successful British television series Downton Abbey, in which they are mentioned as paying their respects to the fictitious Countess of Grantham (played by Elizabeth McGovern), following their attendance of a family funeral.

Peerage of Scotland
Preceded by James Carnegie	Earl of Southesk; 1905–1941	Succeeded by Charles Carnegie
