= Charles Carnegie =

Charles Carnegie may refer to:

- Charles Carnegie, 4th Earl of Southesk (1661–1699), Scottish nobleman
- Charles Carnegie (politician) (1833–1906), MP for Forfarshire
- Charles Carnegie, 10th Earl of Southesk (1854–1941), Scottish nobleman
- Charles Carnegie, 11th Earl of Southesk (1893–1992)
