= Princess Maud, Countess of Southesk =

Granddaughter of King Edward VII (1893-1945)

Princess Maud
- Countess of Southesk
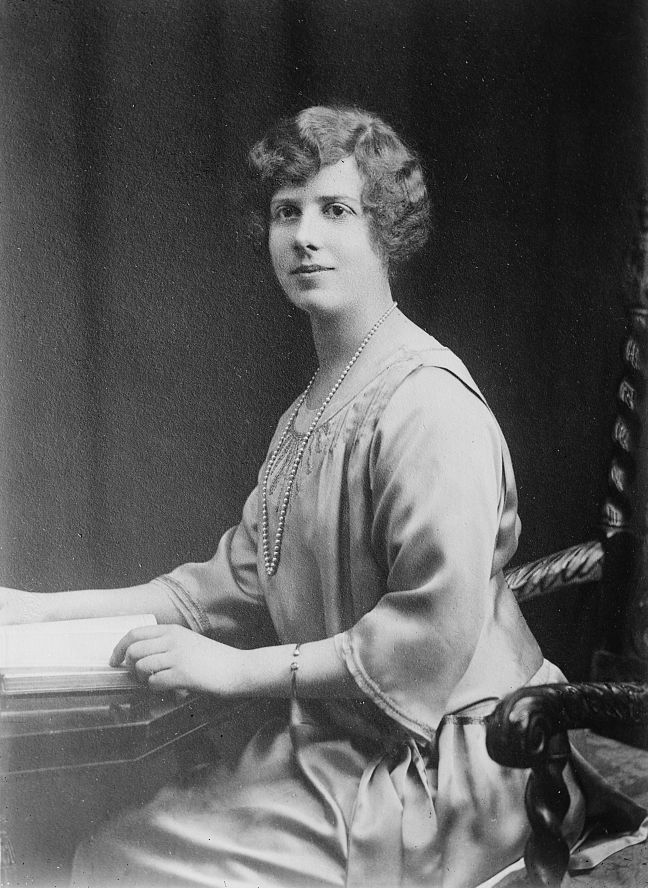
- Maud in the 1920s
- Born: Lady Maud Alexandra Victoria Georgina Bertha Duff; 3 April 1893; East Sheen Lodge, Richmond-upon-Thames, Surrey, England
- Died: 14 December 1945 (aged 52); London, England
- Burial: 18 December 1945; Kinnaird Castle, Brechin, Scotland
- Spouse: Charles Carnegie, 11th Earl of Southesk (m. 1923)
- Issue: James Carnegie, 3rd Duke of Fife
- Father: Alexander Duff, 1st Duke of Fife
- Mother: Louise, Princess Royal

Princess Maud, Countess of Southesk (born Lady Maud Alexandra Victoria Georgina Bertha Duff; 3 April 1893 – 14 December 1945) was a granddaughter of Edward VII. Maud and her elder sister, Alexandra, had the distinction of being the only female-line descendants of a British sovereign officially granted both the title of Princess and the style of Highness.

Although Princess Maud did not otherwise carry out royal engagements, because of her position in the Commonwealth's order of succession she served as a Counsellor of State between 1942 and 1945.

== Early life ==
Maud was born on 3 April 1893 at East Sheen Lodge, Richmond-upon-Thames, Surrey, the daughter of Alexander Duff, 1st Duke of Fife, and Princess Louise of Wales. Her father had been elevated from Earl to Duke of Fife following his marriage to Princess Louise, who was the third child and eldest daughter of the future King Edward VII and Queen Alexandra. She was named after her aunt, the future Queen Maud of Norway.

Maud was christened on 22 June in the Chapel Royal at St James's Palace. She received the names Maud Alexandra Victoria Georgina Bertha. Her godparents were Alexandra, Princess of Wales (later Queen Alexandra); the Empress Frederick of Germany (for whom Princess Louise, Marchioness of Lorne stood proxy); Princess Maud of Wales; Princess Victoria Mary of Teck (later Queen Mary); Prince George, Duke of York (later George V); and Horace Farquhar, 1st Earl Farquhar.

Maud was educated at home under the supervision of her mother, the Duchess of Fife. Like her mother and sister, Maud was an enthusiastic angler, and held record for having caught the largest fish at the River Dee. She also pursued other hobbies such as photography, painting and drawing.

Maud and her sister were unique in sharing descent from both King William IV (through his mistress, Dorothea Jordan), and William IV's niece, Queen Victoria, who succeeded him because he left no legitimate issue.

== Princess ==
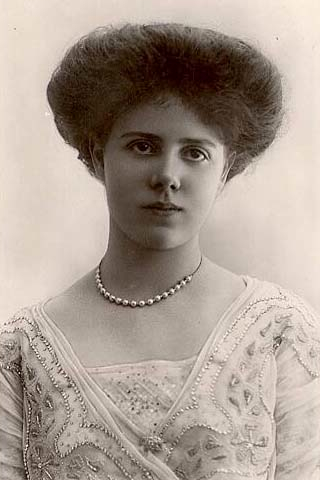
Princess Maud as a teenager

In 1900, Queen Victoria granted Maud's father a second dukedom of Fife in the peerage of the United Kingdom with a special remainder providing for the succession of the duke's daughters and their male-line descendants to the title, in default of a male heir. Maud became second in line to the dukedom, after her elder sister Alexandra, and her descendants would eventually succeed to the peerage.

As a cognatic great-granddaughter of a British monarch (Queen Victoria), Maud was not entitled to the title of a Princess of the United Kingdom of Great Britain and Ireland nor to the attribute Royal Highness. Instead she was styled Lady Maud Duff, as the daughter of a duke. She was fifth in the line of succession to the British throne at the time of her birth.

On 9 November 1905, King Edward VII (on his birthday) gave Maud's mother the title of Princess Royal. He further ordered Garter King of Arms to gazette Maud and her sister with the style and attribute of Highness and the style of Princess prefixed to their respective Christian names, with precedence immediately after all members of the British royal family bearing the style of Royal Highness.

She took part in the carriage procession for members of the royal family when she attended the state funeral of Edward VII in 1910 (she was styled in the London Gazette as "Her Highness Princess Maud" and her sister "Her Highness Princess Alexandra", both without the territorial designation "of Fife"). She attended the coronation of her uncle, George V, on 22 June 1911 with the royal family, styled as "Her Highness Princess Maud" (again without territorial designation).

In December 1911, Princess Maud was involved in the wreck of the P&O liner SS Delhi off Cape Spartel while travelling to Egypt with her parents and sister. During the evacuation of the ship, the boat carrying the royal party capsized, and Maud had to be carried ashore to safety. Although all survived the wreck, her father, Alexander Duff, 1st Duke of Fife, later developed pleurisy attributed to the ordeal and died in Egypt on 29 January 1912.

In 1913, Maud was a bridesmaid at her sister Princess Alexandra's wedding to Prince Arthur of Connaught. Until her own marriage, she acted as a constant companion to her mother, the Princess Royal, often accompanying her to public events and occasionally accompanying her grandmother, Dowager Queen Alexandra.

Maud's uncle, King George V, in letters patent dated 20 November 1917, restructured the styles and titles of the royal family by restricting the titles of Prince or Princess and the style of Royal Highness to the children of the sovereign, the children of the sovereign's sons, and the eldest living son of the eldest son of the Prince of Wales. The Letters Patent also stated that "the titles of Royal Highness, Highness or Serene Highness, and the titular dignity of Prince and Princess shall cease except those titles already granted and remaining unrevoked". This had no direct effect on Maud and her sister, whose rank and style derived from the specific promotions granted to them by their grandfather, Edward VII, and George V took no further action to retract the royal warrant conferring the princely title and attribute upon them. Maud therefore continued to use her princely title until her 1923 marriage. Upon her marriage to Charles, Lord Carnegie, however, she chose to be known as "Lady Maud Carnegie" (or, from 1941, the "Countess of Southesk"), dropping her princely title however remained legally a British princess until her death.

She rode in the carriage procession with members of the royal family at the funeral of George V in 1936; on this occasion she was styled in the London Gazette as "Lady Maud Carnegie". She also attended the coronation of her first cousin George VI in May 1937, taking part in the procession of members of the royal family, and was officially styled as "Lady Maud Carnegie". She was referred to as "Her Highness Princess Maud Alexandra Victoria Georgina Bertha, Countess of Southesk" in letters patent that specified the Counsellors of State in 1943.

== Marriage ==
On 13 November 1923, Maud married Charles, Lord Carnegie (23 September 1893 – 16 February 1992) at the Royal Military Chapel, Wellington Barracks, London. Lord Carnegie was the eldest son of Charles Noel Carnegie, 10th Earl of Southesk and inherited the title of Earl of Southesk on his father's death on 10 November 1941.

Maud and her husband operated a model farm from Elsick House, in Kincardineshire, Scotland. They had one child, James (23 September 1929 – 22 June 2015).

== Girl Guides ==
Maud was a devoted supporter of the Girl Guides movement. She was a County Commissioner in Angus and Aberdeenshire and a member of the executive committee in Scotland. She was a recipient of the Silver Fish Award, Girl Guiding's highest adult honour, in 1937.

== Later life, illness and death ==
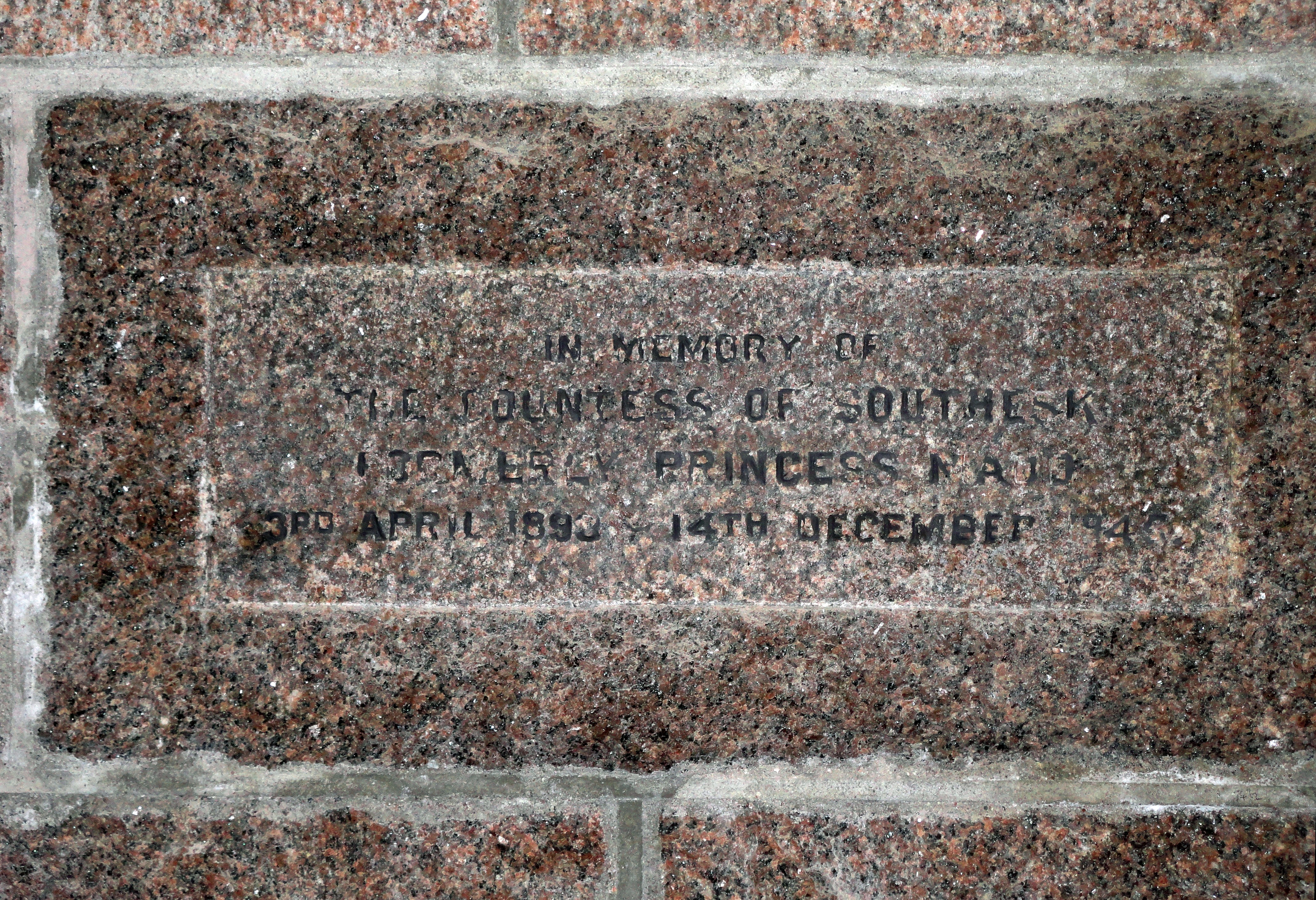
St Ninian's Chapel, Braemar - inscription commemorating Princess Maud, Countess of Southesk (1893–1945)

Maud consistently appeared at the Court of St. James's among the royal family, although she did not undertake official or public duties. During George VI's absence in Africa in 1943, she served as a Counsellor of State. At the time of her death in 1945, she was thirteenth in line to the British throne and heir presumptive to the dukedom of Fife, since her sister's only son Alastair Windsor, 2nd Duke of Connaught and Strathearn, had died in 1943. Maud's only son James, Lord Carnegie, succeeded his aunt as 3rd Duke of Fife in 1959. Upon his father's death, James succeeded to his titles in 1992. Her last public engagement was to act as president for the concert held in aid for the South London Hospital in November 1945.

Maud died at a London nursing home on 14 December 1945 after a bout of acute bronchitis. Her will was sealed in Llandudno in 1946. Her estate was valued at £44,008 (or £1.2 million in 2022 when adjusted for inflation).

== Ancestry ==
Ancestors of Princess Maud, Countess of Southesk

8. Sir Alexander Duff
4. James Duff, 5th Earl Fife
9. Anne Stein
2. Alexander Duff, 1st Duke of Fife
10. William Hay, 18th Earl of Erroll
5. Lady Agnes Hay
11. Lady Elizabeth FitzClarence
1. Princess Maud
12. Prince Albert of Saxe-Coburg and Gotha
6. Edward VII of the United Kingdom
13. Victoria of the United Kingdom
3. Louise, Princess Royal
14. Christian IX of Denmark
7. Princess Alexandra of Denmark
15. Princess Louise of Hesse-Kassel
