= Sir David Carnegie, 4th Baronet =

British politician

Sir David Carnegie of Pitarrow, 4th Baronet FRS FRSE (22 November 1753 – 25 May 1805) was a Scottish politician and (but for the attainder of the 5th Earl) 7th Earl of Southesk, 7th Baron Carnegie of Kinnaird and 7th Baron Carnegie, of Kinnaird and Leuchars.

== Background ==
He was born in Kincardineshire the oldest son of Sir James Carnegie, 3rd Baronet and his wife Christian Doig (d.1820), daughter of David Doig. In 1765, aged only twelve, Carnegie succeeded his father as baronet and as claimant to the Earldom of Southesk. He was educated at Eton College, the University of St Andrews and Christ Church, Oxford.

== Career ==
Carnegie entered the British House of Commons as Member of Parliament (MP) for Aberdeen Burghs in 1784, sitting for the constituency until 1790. He then represented Forfarshire in the Parliament of Great Britain from 1796 until the Act of Union in 1801, then subsequently in the Parliament of the United Kingdom until his death in 1805. Carnegie was Deputy Governor of the British Linen Company. He partly rebuild and improved Kinnaird Castle, Brechin, the family's ancestral seat.

== Family ==
On 23 April 1783, he married Agnes Murray Elliot, daughter of Andrew Elliot, at Edinburgh and had by her ten daughters and two sons. Carnegie died at Gloucester Place in London and was buried at St Martin-in-the-Fields. He was succeeded in his titles by his older son James.

Parliament of Great Britain
Preceded by Adam Drummond	Member of Parliament for Aberdeen Burghs; 1784 – 1790	Succeeded by Alexander Callender
Preceded by William Maule	Member of Parliament for Forfarshire; 1796 – 1801	Succeeded by Parliament of the United Kingdom
Parliament of the United Kingdom
Preceded by Parliament of Great Britain	Member of Parliament for Forfarshire; 1801 – 1805	Succeeded by William Maule
Baronetage of Nova Scotia
Preceded by James Carnegie	Baronet (of Pitarrow); 1765–1805	Succeeded by James Carnegie
Titles in pretence
Peerage of Scotland
Preceded by James Carnegie	Earl of Southesk (forfeit since 1716); 1765–1805	Succeeded by James Carnegie
