= Duchess of Fife =

Wife of the Duke of Fife

Duchess of Fife is typically the wife of the Duke of Fife, an extant title in the Peerage of the United Kingdom which has been created twice, in both cases for Alexander Duff, 6th Earl Fife. In one case, however, the incumbent was Duchess of Fife in her own right (suo jure).

Photo	Name	Arms	Father	Birth	Marriage	Became Duchess	Ceased to be Duchess	Death	Spouse
	Princes Louise of Wales		Edward VII	20 February 1867	22 April 1900	24 April 1900	29 January 1912 husband's death	4 January 1931	Alexander Duff, 1st Duke of Fife
	Princess Alexandra, 2nd Duchess of Fife		Alexander Duff, 1st Duke of Fife	17 May 1891	15 October 1913	4 January 1931 Fathers's death	26 February 1959 her death		Prince Arthur of Connaught (m. 1913; died 1938)
	The Hon. Caroline Dewar		Henry Dewar, 3rd Baron Forteviot	12 February 1934	11 September 1956	26 February 1959	1966 Divorce	Alive	James Carnegie, 3rd Duke of Fife
	Caroline Bunting		Martin Brian Bunting	13 November 1961	16 June 1987	22 June 2015	Incumbent	Alive	David Carnegie, 4th Duke of Fife
