= Earl of Southesk =

Scottish earldom

Earldom of Southesk
- Creation date: 1633
- Created by: Charles I
- Peerage: Peerage of Scotland
- First holder: David Carnegie, 1st Earl of Southesk
- Present holder: David Carnegie, 13th Earl of Southesk
- Heir apparent: Charles Carnegie
- Remainder to: the male heirs of the body lawfully begotten
- Status: Extant
- Seat: Kinnaird Castle

Earl of Southesk is a title in the Peerage of Scotland. It was created in 1633 for Sir David Carnegie, an Extraordinary Lord of Session. He had already been created Lord Carnegie of Kinnaird in 1616 and was made Lord Carnegie, of Kinnaird and Leuchars, at the same time he was given the earldom. These titles are all in the Peerage of Scotland. The earldom is named after the River South Esk in Angus. Carnegie's younger brother John Carnegie was given the corresponding title: earl of Northesk. The earl of Southesk also holds the Scottish feudal title of Baron of Kinnaird and is a baronet in the Baronetage of Nova Scotia. Kinnaird Castle, Brechin, has been the home of the earls of Southesk for several hundred years.

The first earl of Southesk's great-great-grandson, the fifth earl, was involved in the Jacobite rising of 1715. As a result, he was attainted by Act of Parliament and his titles and estates forfeited. The representation of the family then passed to his third cousin Sir James Carnegie, 3rd Baronet, of Pittarrow (now recognized as the de jure sixth earl of Southesk; for earlier history of the baronetcy, see below). In contrast to his cousin, he fought on the side of King George II during the Jacobite rebellion, and later purchased his cousin's forfeited estates. Carnegie also sat as a Member of Parliament for Kincardineshire. His son, the fourth baronet and de jure seventh earl, also represented this constituency in the House of Commons. His son, the fifth baronet and de jure eighth earl, briefly represented Aberdeen in Parliament. His son, the sixth baronet and de jure ninth earl, obtained a reversal of the attainder in 1855 and became the ninth earl of Southesk. Lord Southesk notably served as Lord Lieutenant of Kincardineshire. In 1869 he was created Baron Balinhard, of Farnell in the County of Forfar, in the Peerage of the United Kingdom. This title gave the earls an automatic seat in the House of Lords. His grandson, the eleventh earl, married Princess Maud, granddaughter of King Edward VII. Princess Maud and her elder sister Princess Alexandra were in special remainder to the Dukedom of Fife. On Alexandra's death in 1959, the titles passed to her nephew James Carnegie, Lord Carnegie, the only son of the eleventh earl of Southesk and Princess Maud (who died in 1945), who became the third duke. On his father's death in 1992, the Duke also succeeded as twelfth earl of Southesk. The earldom and minor titles are now subsidiary titles of the Dukedom of Fife, with the title of earl of Southesk used as a courtesy title by the duke's eldest son and heir apparent.

The Carnegie baronetcy, of Pittarrow in the County of Kincardine, was created in the Baronetage of Nova Scotia on 20 February 1663 for David Carnegie. He was the son of Hon. Sir Alexander Carnegie, fourth son of the first earl of Southesk. As mentioned above, his grandson, the third baronet, became representative of the family after his cousin's attainder in 1715.

== Earls of Southesk (1633) ==
- David Carnegie, 1st Earl of Southesk (1575–1658)
- James Carnegie, 2nd Earl of Southesk (born before 1583–1669)
- Robert Carnegie, 3rd Earl of Southesk (born before 1649–1688)
- Charles Carnegie, 4th Earl of Southesk (1661–1699)
- James Carnegie, 5th Earl of Southesk (1692–1730) (attainted 1716)
- James Carnegie, de jure 6th Earl of Southesk (c. 1715–1765)
- David Carnegie, de jure 7th Earl of Southesk (1753–1805)
- James Carnegie, de jure 8th Earl of Southesk (1799–1849)
- James Carnegie, 9th Earl of Southesk (1827–1905) (restored in 1855)
- Charles Noel Carnegie, 10th Earl of Southesk (1854–1941)
- Charles Alexander Carnegie, 11th Earl of Southesk (1893–1992)
- James George Alexander Bannerman Carnegie, 3rd Duke of Fife, 12th Earl of Southesk (1929–2015)
- see Duke of Fife for further holders

== Carnegie baronets, of Pittarrow (1663) ==
Carnegie baronets, of Pittarrow
- Escutcheon of the Carnegie baronets of Pittarrow
- Motto: Dread God
- Arms: Or, an eagle, displayed, azure armed and beaked gules
- Crest: A dexter hand, holding a thunder-bolt proper
- Supporters: Two greyhounds, collared

- Sir David Carnegie, 1st Baronet (born before 1674–1708)
- Sir John Carnegie, 2nd Baronet (1673–1729)
- Sir James Carnegie, 3rd Baronet (c. 1715–1765) (de jure 6th Earl of Southesk)
- Sir David Carnegie, 4th Baronet (1753–1805) (de jure 7th Earl of Southesk)
- Sir James Carnegie, 5th Baronet (1799–1849) (de jure 8th Earl of Southesk)
- Sir James Carnegie, 6th Baronet (1827–1905) (restored as Earl of Southesk in 1855)

see above for further holders of the baronetcy

== Family tree ==
Family tree: Earls of Fife, Dukes of Fife, Earls of Southesk and Earls of Northesk

(Mormaers) Earls of Fife (Scot)
Donnchad (Duncan) I 1113–1154; Earl of Fife
Donnchad (Duncan/Dunecan) II d. 1204; Earl of Fife
Máel Coluim (Maol Choluim, Malcolm) I 1204–1228; Earl of Fife | Donnchadh
Máel Coluim (Malcolm) II c. Early 13th century–1266 Earl of Fife
Colban c. 1247–1253–1270/1272; Earl of Fife
Donnchadh (Duncan) III; 1270/1272–1288; Earl of Fife
Robert II of Scotland; 1316–1390; King of Scotland | Donnchadh (Duncan) IV; 1289–1353; Earl of Fife
Robert III of Scotland c. 1337–1406; King of Scotland | m1. Walter Stewart c. 1338–1362; Earl of Fife jure uxoris | Isabella MacDuff c. 1320–1389; Countess of Fife suo jure | Robert Stewart c. 1340–1420; Duke of Albany, Earl of Fife, Earl of Menteith, Earl of Buchan, Earl of Atholl | m2. Thomas Bisset d. 1366; Earl of Fife jure uxoris | m3. John Dunbar d. before 1371; Earl of Fife jure uxoris
Murdoch Stewart; 1362–1425; Earl of Fife; Duke of Albany
David Carnegie of Colluthie; 1559–1598
Earl of Southesk, 1633
David Carnegie; 1575–1658; 1st Earl of Southesk
Earl of Northesk, 1662
John Carnegie; 1611–1667; 1st Earl of Northesk
James Carnegie before 1583–1669; 2nd Earl of Southesk | Alexander Carnegie d. 1681/82 | David Carnegie d. 1669; 2nd Earl of Northesk
Robert Carnegie before 1649–1688; 3rd Earl of Southesk | David Carnegie d. 1708; 1st Baronet | David Carnegie; 1643–1688; 3rd Earl of Northesk | Patrick Carnegie of Lour after 1643–1743
Charles Carnegie; 1661–1699; 4th Earl of Southesk | James Carnegie; 1673–1729; 2nd Baronet | David Carnegie; 1675–1729; 4th Earl of Northesk | Patrick Carnegie of Lour; 1684–1729
Viscount Macduff and Baron Braco, 1735; Earl Fife, 1759
William Duff; 1697–1763; 1st Earl Fife, etc. | James Carnegie; 1692–1730; 5th Earl of Southesk | James Carnegie; 1716–1765 de jure 6th Earl of Southesk | David Carnegie; 1701–1741; 5th Earl of Northesk | George Carnegie; 1716–1792; 6th Earl of Northesk | Patrick Carnegie of Lour; 1720–1799
Earldom of Southesk attainted, 1716
Baron Fife (GB), 1790
James Duff; 1729–1809; 2nd Earl Fife, etc., Baron Fife (GB) | Alexander Duff; 1731–1811; 3rd Earl Fife, etc. | David Carnegie; 1753–1805 de jure 7th Earl of Southesk | William Carnegie; 1756–1831; 7th Earl of Northesk | Patrick Carnegie of Lour; 1757–1819
Baron Fife (GB) extinct, 1809
Baron Fife (UK), 1827
James Duff; 1776–1857; 4th Earl Fife, etc., Baron Fife (UK) | Alexander Duff; 1777–1851 | James Carnegie; 1799–1849 de jure 8th Earl of Southesk | William Hopetoun Carnegie; 1794–1878; 8th Earl of Northesk | Alexander Carnegie; 1793–1862
Baron Fife (UK) extinct, 1809
Baron Skene, 1857 | Southesk attainder reversed, 1855
Queen Victoria; 1819–1901 | James Duff; 1814–1879; 5th Earl Fife, etc., 1st Baron Skene | James Carnegie; 1827–1905; 9th Earl of Southesk | Alexander Carnegie; 1829–1900
King Edward VII; 1841–1910 | Prince Arthur; 1850–1942; Duke of Connaught and Strathearn | George John Carnegie; 1843–1891; 9th Earl of Northesk
Earl of Fife, 1885; Duke of Fife (Scotland), 1889; Duke of Fife (UK), Marquess of Macduff, and Earl of Macduff, 1900
King George V 1865–1936 | Louise, Princess Royal; 1867–1931; Duchess of Fife | Alexander William George Duff; 1849–1912; 1st Duke of Fife (Scot) and Earl of Fife, 1st Duke of Fife (UK) and Earl of Macduff, Marquess of Macduff; 6th Earl Fife, etc., 2nd Baron Skene | Charles Noel Carnegie; 1854–1941; 10th Earl of Southesk | David John Carnegie; 1865–1921; 10th Earl of Northesk | Douglas George Carnegie; 1870–1937 | Charles Carnegie; 1864–1928
Dukedom of Fife (Scot), Marquess of Macduff, Earldom Fife (1759), Viscountcy of Macduff, and Baronies of Braco and Skene extinct, 1912
Prince Arthur of Connaught; 1883–1938 | Princess Alexandra; 1891–1959; 2nd Duchess of Fife (UK), etc. suo jure | Maud Carnegie; 1893–1945; Countess of Southesk | Charles Alexander Bannerman Carnegie; 1893–1992; 11th Earl of Southesk | David Ludovic George Hopetoun Carnegie; 1901–1963; 11th Earl of Northesk | John Douglas Carnegie; 1895–1975; 12th Earl of Northesk | Patrick Carnegy; 1893–1969
Prince Alastair Arthur (later Alistair Windsor); 1914–1943; Duke of Connaught and Strathearn | James George Alexander Bannerman Carnegie; 1929–2015; 3rd Duke of Fife, etc., 12th Earl of Southesk | Robert Andrew Carnegie; 1926–1994; 13th Earl of Northesk | Patrick Charles Carnegy b. 1940; 15th Earl of Northesk | Colin Carnegy b. 1942
Heir presumptive to the Earldom of Northesk
David Charles Carnegie b. 1961; 4th Duke of Fife, etc., 13th Earl of Southesk | David John MacRae Carnegie; 1954–2010; 14th Earl of Northesk
Charles Carnegie b. 1989 styled Earl of Southesk | George Carnegie b. 1991 | Hugh Carnegie b. 1993
Heir apparent

== See also ==
- Duke of Fife
- Earl of Northesk
- Carnegie (disambiguation)
