= James Carnegie, 9th Earl of Southesk =

Scottish nobleman, explorer and poet

The Right Honourable The Earl of Southesk KT DL FRGS
- Lord Southesk by Richard James Lane, 1861

Lord Lieutenant of Kincardineshire
- In office 1849–1856
- Preceded by: Sir Thomas Burnett, 8th Baronet
- Succeeded by: The Earl of Kintore

Personal details
- Born: James Carnegie; November 16, 1827 Edinburgh, Scotland
- Died: February 21, 1905 (aged 77) Angus, Scotland
- Spouses: Lady Catherine Hamilton Noel (m. 1849; died 1855) Lady Susan Catherine Mary Murray (m. 1860)
- Children: 11
- Parent(s): Sir James Carnegie, 5th Baronet; Charlotte Lysons
- Education: Edinburgh Academy
- Alma mater: Royal Military College, Sandhurst
- Occupation: Explorer, poet

James Carnegie, 9th Earl of Southesk, KT, DL, FRGS (16 November 1827 – 21 February 1905) was a Scottish nobleman, explorer and poet.

== Early life ==
Born in Edinburgh, on 16 November 1827, Southesk was the son of Sir James Carnegie, 5th Baronet and Charlotte Lysons, daughter of the Reverend Daniel Lysons.

Through his great-great-great-grandfather, who was the fourth son of David Carnegie, 1st Earl of Southesk, James was the heir to the earldom of Southesk and the lordship of Carnegie. The fifth earl was involved in the Jacobite rising of 1715 and was attainted, with his titles and estates forfeited. However, in 1855 Sir James Carnegie obtained a reversal of his kinsman's attainder by Act of Parliament and became the ninth Earl of Southesk.

He attended the Edinburgh Academy, received his military training at the Royal Military College, Sandhurst, and in 1845 joined the 92nd Regiment of Foot, before transferring to the Grenadier Guards the next year, with whom he served for three years. In 1849, he was appointed Lord Lieutenant of Kincardineshire, a position he continued to hold until 1856, when he sold his lands in Kincardineshire.

== Career ==
On 30 January 1849, he succeeded as the 6th Baronet Carnegie, of Pittarrow, co. Kincardine in the Baronetage of Nova Scotia. On 2 July 1855, after the original precedence by reversal by Act of Parliament of the Act of Attainder, he succeeded as the 9th Lord Carnegie of Kinnaird, the 9th Lord Carnegie of Kinnaird and Leuchars, and the 9th Earl of Southesk, all in the Peerage of Scotland.

On 7 December 1869, he was created 1st Baron Balinhard, of Farnell, Forfar in the Peerage of the United Kingdom. He held the office of Deputy Lieutenant of Forfarshire.

=== 1859 North American expedition ===
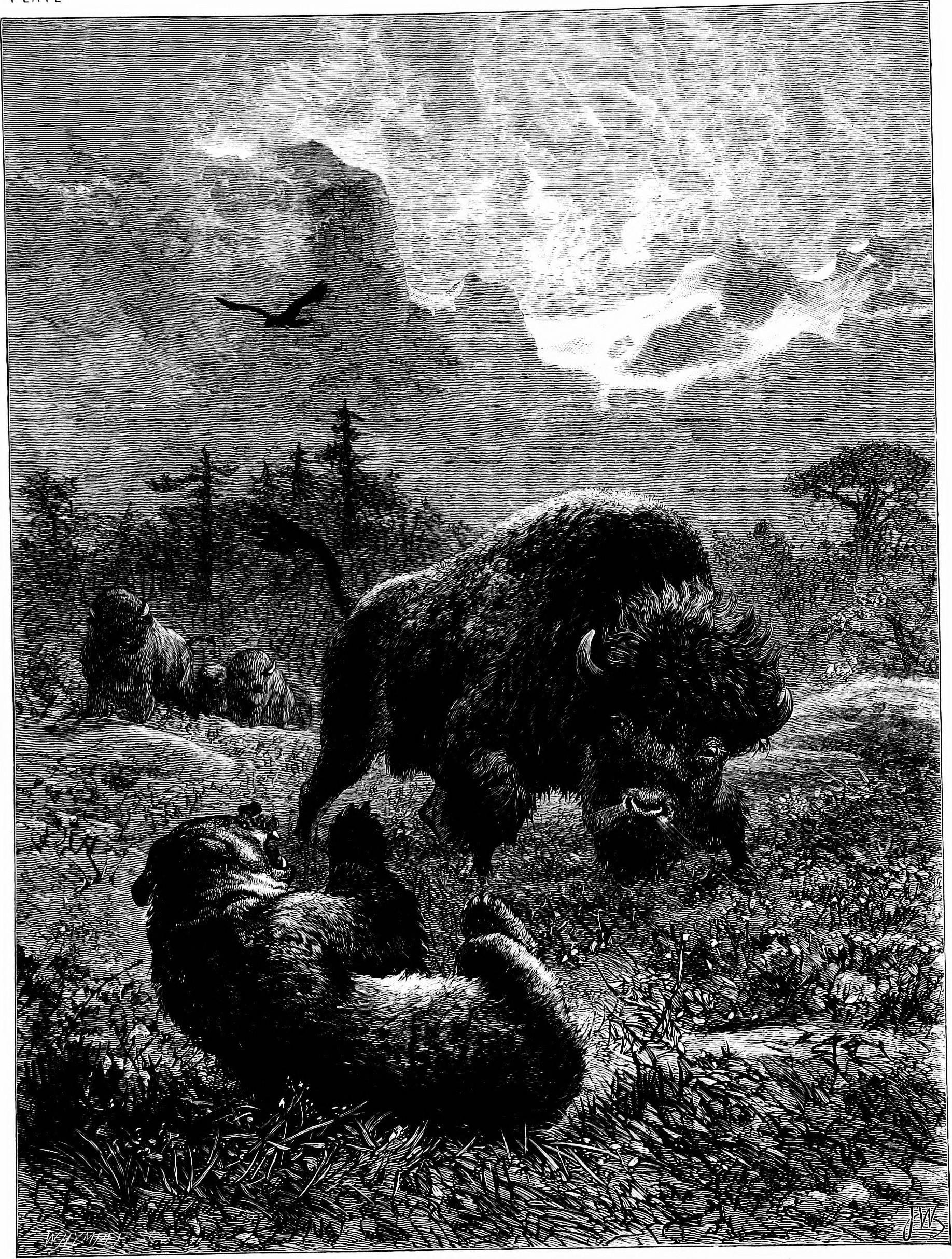
Plains grizzly bear and plains bison

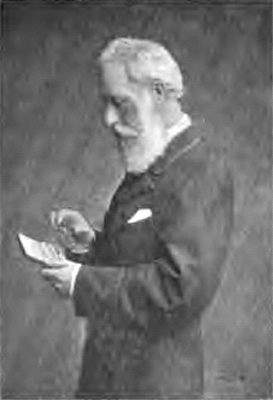
James, Earl of Southesk

In 1859, after the death of his first wife, the Earl was advised that to improve his health he should travel to a place where he could live an open-air life and hunt. In 1859, at the age of 32, he embarked on a trip to the Hudson's Bay Company (HBC) trading area, which later became western Canada. He travelled through the prairies to Fort Edmonton, then to the east slopes of the Rockies, seeing much of the western part of present-day north-central Alberta before returning to New York by way of Winnipeg.

Carnegie wrote that the reason for the expedition was to, "travel in some part of the world where good sport could be met with among the larger animals, and where, at the same time, I might recruit my health by an active open-air life in a healthy climate."

— James Carnegie, 9th Earl of Southesk

Southesk left Liverpool on 15 April 1859 on a Cunard paddle-wheeler called the Africa for North America. Eventually, he ended up in St. Paul, Minnesota, the jumping-off point for his expedition, and then continued on north to Fort Garry, the HBC's western headquarters in the Red River Colony, today's Winnipeg. He travelled with Sir George Simpson, governor of the HBC. The Earl received considerable support from Simpson who helped the Earl arrange for guides, supplies and horses. He gave the Earl a map and instructed HBC employees to show him "every attention".

In June, Southesk headed out west from Winnipeg. Over the next seven months, the expedition travelled more than 4,000 kilometres, across the northern prairies, through parts of the Rocky Mountains, then across the prairies once again back to Winnipeg. The plan was to head west out of Fort Garry west into Rupert's Land, to hunt bears and bison.

He arrived at Fort Edmonton on 1 August. At the fort he bought horses, hired a Métis, Antoine Blandoine, to be his guide, and built enough pack saddles to haul his outfit.

The party went into the mountains west of the future site of Cadomin to pursue bighorn sheep. The expedition went up the Athabasca River to the McLeod River and the Medicine Tent River (in present-day Jasper National Park). In September he noted that he was now in country that, "no European had ever seen, where bears and wild sheep were certain to be abundant."

On September 6, he wrote in his journal, "I am the first European who has visited this valley [at the head of the Medicine Tent and North Saskatchewan rivers], and if I might have the geographic honour of giving my name to some spot of earth, I should choose the mountain near which the two rivers rise."

Worried that that mountain (Mount Southesk) had already been named and therefore could not carry his name, he climbed a mountain located 6 km north of Mount Southesk and erected a cairn on top that can still be seen today. This mountain is named Southesk Cairn in his honour. As well, Southesk Pass, Southesk River and Southesk Lake, all nearby, bear his name.

The expedition then crossed over Southesk Pass, also known as Cairn Pass, and pressed on to the Kootenay Plains of the North Saskatchewan River valley. The expedition followed the Siffleur River, crossed over the Pipestone Pass, and followed the Pipestone River to the Bow River. The Earl nearly crossed paths with another explorer, James Hector, at a time when there were very few Europeans in the Rockies. The two passed through the same route going in opposite directions about a month apart in time.

The Southesk party then travelled back to Fort Edmonton, arriving October 12. Southesk made his way east, arriving at Fort Garry (Winnipeg) on January 8, 1860. He travelled on to New York and made the voyage home to England on the Cunard liner Etna, arriving in February 1860.

For the expedition he employed several Métis guides and helpers: James McKay, John McKay, George Klyne, John "Piscan" Munroe, Baptiste La Grace, James "Little Dog" Short, Antoine Blandion, Pierre Desnomme, Thomas Arinwakena, and Duncan Robertson. These men were experienced buffalo hunters. During this trip which took him west to Fort Edmonton and into the Rocky Mountains he commissioned and collected several Métis and aboriginal artifacts.

He wrote an account of his trip, Saskatchewan and the Rocky Mountains (published in 1874). His research on the Cree language was published that same year, under the title The Cree syllabic characters, terminations, &c.

An exhibit dedicated to the Earl's prairie and mountain trip, including a life-sized statue of a large plains grizzly bear he killed while on a bison hunt on the nearby prairie, is at Ancient Echoes Interpretive Centre in Herschel, Saskatchewan.

=== The Southesk Collection at the Royal Alberta Museum ===
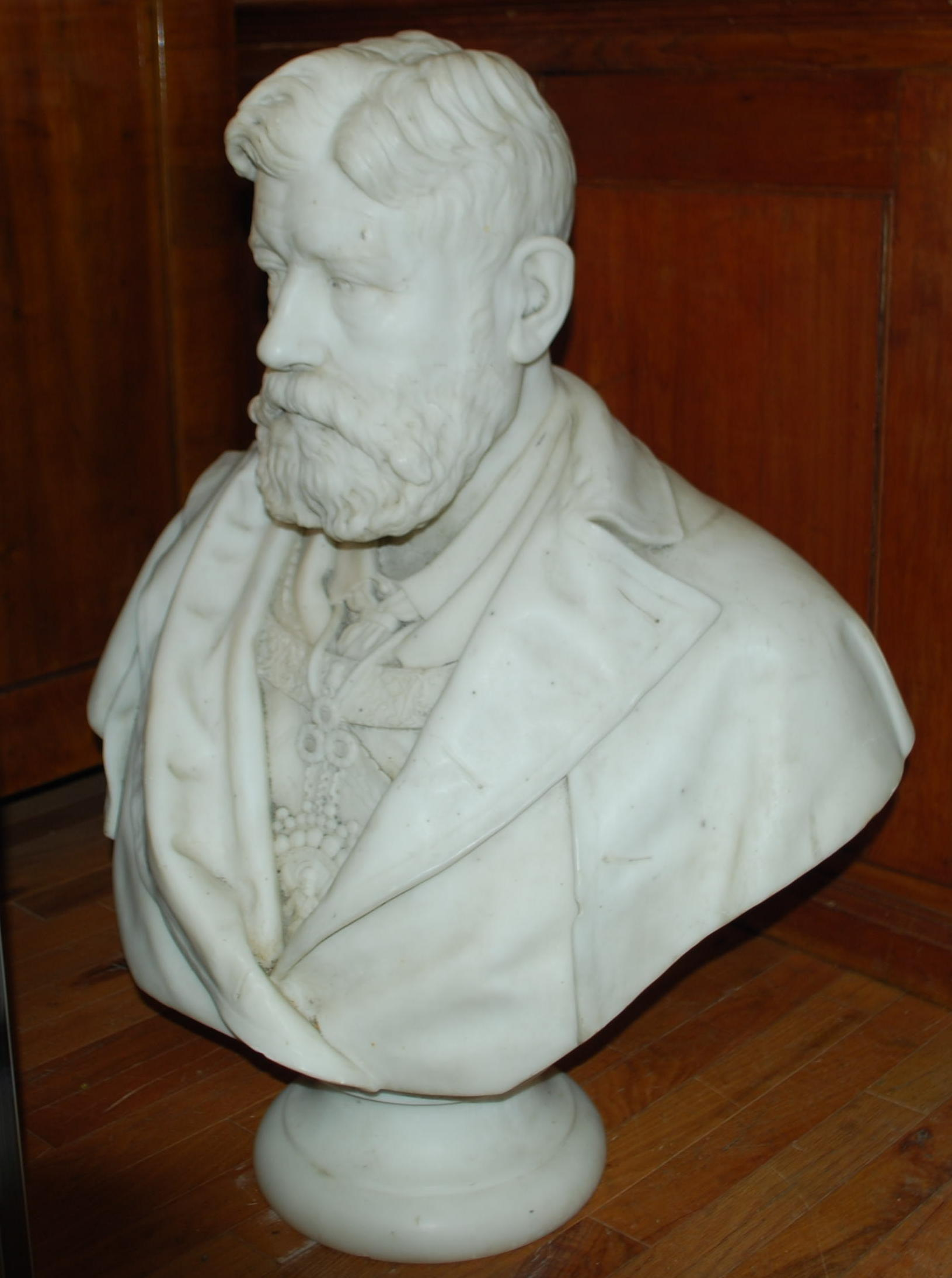
Bust of the Earl, by William Grant Stevenson

Throughout the 1859 Canadian expedition, Southesk collected objects made by First Nations and Métis people whom he met in the course of his travels. The artifacts returned home with Southesk to Kinnaird Castle, the family estate in Scotland where they remained for the next 146 years, until 2006, when the earl's descendants put them up for auction at Sotheby's in New York.

The Royal Alberta Museum purchased many of the items put up for sale. for $1.1 million. Although relatively small, the Southesk collection is historically significant given that objects from the northern Plains dating to the 1850s are rare and that many of the artifacts are of exceptional quality. Although modest in size, the collection includes work from at least five distinct cultures: Plains Cree, Blackfoot, Métis, Nakoda and Anishnaabe. The current Earl of Southesk subsequently donated five additional items linked with the collection.

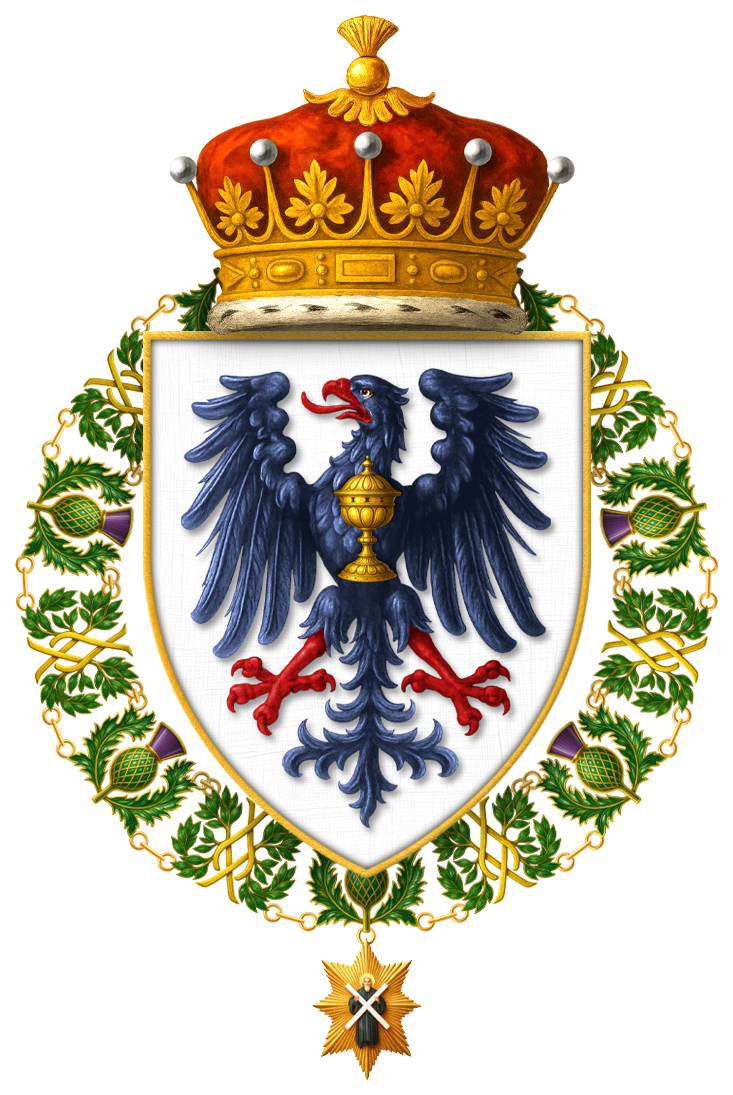
Shield of Arms of James Carnegie, 9th Earl of Southesk, KT, DL, FRGS

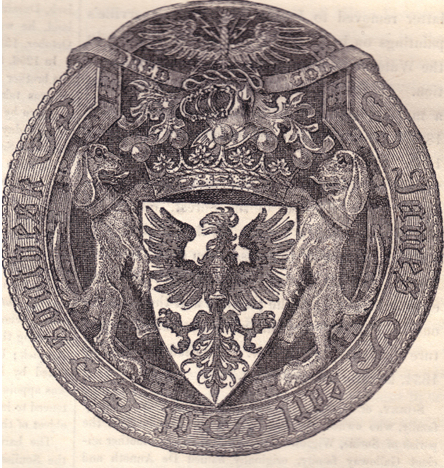
His seal

=== Publications ===
==== Novels ====
- Herminius: a romance. (1862)
- Suomiria: a fantasy (1899)

==== Short fiction ====
- Some Sort of Madness [excerpt] (1982) [only as by Earl of Southesk]

==== Non-Fiction ====
- Saskatchewan and the Rocky Mountains: a diary and narrative of travel, sport, and adventure, during a journey through the Hudson's Bay Company's territories, in 1859 and 1860. (1875)
- Origins of Pictish symbolism; with notes on the sun boar and a new reading of the Newton inscriptions. (1893)
- The Ogham Inscriptions of Scotland. (1885)
- Britain's art paradise; or, Notes on some pictures in the Royal Academy, (1871)

==== Poetry ====
(His poetry is said to tend to the occult.)

- Lurida lumina. (1876)
- The Burial of Isis, and other poems. (1884)
- Jonas Fisher, a poem in brown and white. (1875)
- Greenwood's farewell and other poems. (1876)
- The Meda Maiden, and other poems. (1877)

==== Catalogues ====
- Catalogue of the collection of antique gems formed by James, ninth earl of Southesk, K.T.; edited by his daughter Lady Helena Carnegie. (1908)
- The letter archive of James Carnegie, 9th Earl of Southesk, and the Pictish symbol stones of Aberdeenshire; Lynda McGuigan. (2020)

== Personal life ==
On 19 June 1849, Sir James married Lady Catherine Hamilton Noel (1829–1855) at Exton Park, Rutland, England. Lady Catherine was the second daughter of Charles Noel, 1st Earl of Gainsborough and, his third wife, Annabella Hamlyn-Williams (second daughter of Sir James Hamlyn-Williams, 2nd Baronet of Clovelly Court). Before Catherine's death in 1855, at the age of twenty-six, they had one son and three daughters:

- Lady Arabella Charlotte Carnegie (1850–1907), who married Samuel Romilly, DL, the paternal grandson of Samuel Romilly and maternal grandson of Gilbert Elliot-Murray-Kynynmound, 2nd Earl of Minto. They had four children.
- Lady Constance Mary Carnegie (1851–1909), who married Victor Bruce, 9th Earl of Elgin. They had issue.
- Lady Beatrice Diana Cecilia Carnegie (1852–1934), who married Rev. Henry Holmes Stewart, Rector of Michaelston-le-Pit and son of James Stewart of Cairnsmore.
- Charles Noel Carnegie, 10th Earl of Southesk (1854–1941), who married Ethel Mary Elizabeth Bannerman, the only child of Sir Alexander Bannerman, 9th Baronet and Lady Arabella Diana Sackville-West (the youngest daughter of Lord Chamberlain George Sackville-West, 5th Earl De La Warr and Elizabeth Sackville-West, Countess De La Warr).

In 1860, Lord Southesk married Lady Susan Catherine Mary Murray (1837–1915), eldest daughter of Alexander, Earl of Dunmore. They had three sons and four daughters, including:

- Sir Lancelot Douglas Carnegie (1861–1933), who married Marion Alice de Gournay Barclay, youngest daughter of Henry Ford Barclay in 1890, and had issue.
- Lady Dora Susan Carnegie (1863–1952), who married Maj. Ernest de Rodakowski-Rivers, son of General Josef de Rodakowski by his wife Ottilia, Countess Wrangel.
- Lady Elizabeth Erica Carnegie (1864–1897), who died unmarried.
- Lady Helena Mariota Carnegie (1865–1943), who died unmarried.
- Lady Katherine Agnes Blanche Carnegie (1867–1949), who married Courtenay Morgan, 1st Viscount Tredegar. Had issue.
- Hon. Robert Francis Carnegie (1869–1947), who married Violet Mabel Fraser, second daughter of Philip Affleck Fraser, 18th of Reelig, and Augusta Zella Webb (eldest daughter and heiress of William Frederick Webb).
- Hon. David Wynford Carnegie (1871–1900), an explorer who died unmarried.

Lord Southesk died on 21 February 1905, aged seventy-seven while at his home in Kinnaird Castle in Scotland. He was succeeded by his son from his first marriage, Charles Noel Carnegie.

== Legacy and honours ==
- Fellow of the Royal Geographical Society (1860)
- Knight of the Order of the Thistle. (1869) on Prime Minister Gladstone's recommendation.
- Honorary LL.D. from St. Andrews. (1872)
- Honorary LL.D. from Aberdeen University. (1875)

Honorary titles
Preceded by Sir Thomas Burnett	Lord Lieutenant of Kincardineshire; 1849–1856	Succeeded by The Earl of Kintore
Peerage of Scotland
Preceded by James Carnegie as de jure earl	Earl of Southesk; 1855–1905	Succeeded by Charles Carnegie
Peerage of the United Kingdom
New creation	Baron Balinhard; 1869–1905	Succeeded by Charles Carnegie
Baronetage of Nova Scotia
Preceded by James Carnegie	Baronet (of Pittarrow, Kincardineshire); 1849–1905	Succeeded by Charles Carnegie
