= David Carnegie, 4th Duke of Fife =

Scottish duke

His Grace The Duke of Fife
- Full name: David Charles Carnegie
- Born: David Charles Carnegie; 3 March 1961 (age 65); Marylebone, London, England
- Spouse: Caroline Anne Bunting (m. 1987)
- Issue: Charles Carnegie, Earl of Southesk; Lord George Carnegie; Lord Hugh Carnegie
- Parents: James Carnegie, 3rd Duke of Fife; Caroline Dewar
- Occupation: Landowner
- Education: Eton College; Pembroke College, Cambridge; Royal Agricultural University; University of Edinburgh

David Charles Carnegie, 4th Duke of Fife (born 3 March 1961) is a British and Scottish peer, landowner, and business man. He was styled Earl of Macduff until 1992, and then Earl of Southesk until succeeding his father on 22 June 2015 as the fourth Duke of Fife and Chief of the Clan Carnegie.

He is also Earl of Macduff and Baron Balinhard, in the peerage of the United Kingdom; Earl of Southesk and Lord Carnegie of Kinnaird, in the peerage of Scotland; and a Baronet, of Pittarrow in the County of Kincardine, in the Baronetage of Nova Scotia.

== Early life ==
The only surviving son of the late James Carnegie, 3rd Duke of Fife, and his former wife Caroline Dewar, Carnegie was educated at Eton College, Pembroke College, Cambridge, where he graduated in 1982 with a BA degree, and the Royal Agricultural College, Cirencester. In 1986, he received the Cambridge MA degree by seniority.

A great-grandson of Louise, Princess Royal (1867–1931), eldest daughter of Edward VII, he is the highest in the line of succession to the British throne who is not a descendant of George V. He is a third cousin of Charles III.

== Career ==
While still styled Earl of Macduff, Fife was employed by London-based stock brokerage firm Cazenove between 1982 and 1985. Between 1988 and 1989, he was with the Edinburgh-based investment management firm of Bell, Lawrie and Company. He graduated from the University of Edinburgh Business School in 1990 with an MBA degree. Between 1992 and 1996, he was with chartered accountants and financial advisers Reeves and Neylan. As of 2003, he was living at Kinnaird Castle in Angus, Scotland, one of his father's family seats.

== Marriage and issue ==
Carnegie married on 16 June 1987 in London, Caroline Anne Bunting (born Windsor, 1961), only daughter of Martin Brian Bunting and his wife Veronica Mary Cope. They have three sons:

- Charles Duff Carnegie, Earl of Southesk (born Edinburgh, Midlothian, 1 July 1989), married on 5 September 2020 at Kinnaird Castle, Brechin, Camille Ascoli (born Paris, 6 March 1990), daughter of Roberto Ascoli (born Milan, June 1961) and wife Valérie Marie Christine Ledoux, daughter of Marc Ledoux (Soissons, 20 June 1932 – Villers-Cotterêts, 24 December 2012) and wife Françoise Marie Jolicoeur. They have two daughters:
  - Lady Chloe Françoise Carnegie (b. 15 December 2022)
  - Lady Chiara Louise Carnegie (b. 21 April 2025)
- Lord George William Carnegie (born Edinburgh 23 March 1991), married on 7 June 2025 at St. Paul's Church, Ashford Hill with Headley, Matilda Elizabeth St Aubyn (born 19 January 1994) a descendant of the first Baron St Levan.
- Lord Hugh Alexander Carnegie (born Dundee 10 June 1993), married on 30 August 2025 at Kinnaird Castle, Brechin, Catherine Morgan (born in July 1993).

The Duchess of Fife is a Deputy Lieutenant (DL) for Angus.

== Titles, styles, honours and arms ==
- 3 March 1961 – 16 February 1992: Earl of Macduff
- 16 February 1992 – 22 June 2015: Earl of Southesk
- 22 June 2015 – present: His Grace The Duke of Fife

Coat of arms of David Carnegie, 4th Duke of Fife
Coronet A Coronet of a Duke Crest A Thunderbolt proper, winged Or. Escutcheon Or, a Lion rampant Gules, armed and langued Azure (the Dukedom of Fife), and on an Inescutcheon Argent, ensigned of an Earl's Coronet proper, an Eagle displayed Azure, armed, beaked and membered Gules, and charged on its breast with an Antique Covered Cup Or (Carnegie) Supporters Dexter: a Lion guardant Gules, langued Azure, collared with a Label of five-points Argent, charged with two Thistles proper, between three Crosses of St George Gules. Sinister: a Talbot Argent, collared and langued Gules Motto Above the crest, on a Scroll DRED GOD; beneath the shield DEO JUVANTE

== Notes and sources ==
Peerage of the United Kingdom
Preceded by James Carnegie	Duke of Fife; 2nd creation 2015–present	Incumbent
Lines of succession
Preceded by Maximillian Lascelles	Succession to the British throne descended from Louise, daughter of Edward VII	Succeeded by Charles Carnegie, Earl of Southesk
Peerage of Scotland
Preceded by James Carnegie	Earl of Southesk; 2015–present	Incumbent
Orders of precedence in the United Kingdom
Preceded by The Duke of Westminster	Gentlemen; The Duke of Fife	Succeeded by Earl of Ulster
