= Sir James Carnegie, 3rd Baronet =

Scottish politician and soldier

Sir James Carnegie of Pittarrow, 3rd Baronet (1716 – 30 April 1765) was a Scottish politician, soldier and (but for the attainder of the 5th Earl) 6th Earl of Southesk, 6th Baron Carnegie of Kinnaird and 6th Baron Carnegie, of Kinnaird and Leuchars.

== Background ==
He was the eldest son of Sir John Carnegie, 2nd Baronet and his wife Mary Burnett, daughter of Sir Thomas Burnett, 3rd Baronet. In 1729, aged only thirteen, he succeeded his father as baronet. A year later, with the death of his cousin, the forfeited James Carnegie, 5th Earl of Southesk, he would have succeeded to that title also, but for the attainder. His guardians until his majority Andrew Fletcher, Lord Milton and Sir Alexander Ramsay of Balmain sent Carnegie to the University of Glasgow for education.

== Career ==
Carnegie joined the British Army in 1737 and served under Prince William, Duke of Cumberland in the Battle of Fontenoy in 1745. A year later he fought for the House of Hanover in the Battle of Culloden, while his younger brother supported the Jacobite side. Carnegie entered the British House of Commons in 1741, representing Kincardineshire until his death in 1765.

== Family ==
On 5 July 1752, he married Christian Doig, eldest daughter of David Doig, and by her had two daughters and four sons. Carnegie died and was buried at Stamford, Lincolnshire. He was succeeded in the baronetcy by his oldest son David.

Parliament of Great Britain
| Preceded by John Falconer | Member of Parliament for Kincardineshire; 1741 – 1765 | Succeeded by Sir Alexander Ramsay-Irvine |
Baronetage of Nova Scotia
| Preceded by John Carnegie | Baronet (of Pittarrow); 1729–1765 | Succeeded by David Carnegie |
Titles in pretence
Peerage of Scotland
| Preceded by James Carnegie | Earl of Southesk (forfeit 1716); 1730–1765 | Succeeded by David Carnegie |
