= James Carnegie, 2nd Earl of Southesk =

Scottish nobleman

James Carnegie, 2nd Earl of Southesk (c. 1600–1669) was a Scottish nobleman. He inherited the Earldom of Southesk from David Carnegie, 1st Earl of Southesk.

His son, Robert Carnegie, 3rd Earl of Southesk, succeeded him.

Peerage of Scotland
Preceded by David Carnegie	Earl of Southesk; 1658–1669	Succeeded by Robert Carnegie
