= Sir David Carnegie, 1st Baronet =

Scottish politician and noble

Sir David Carnegie of Pitcarrow, 1st Baronet (died November 1708) was a Scottish politician and baronet.

== Background ==
He was the eldest son of Hon. Alexander Carnegie, himself fourth son of David Carnegie, 1st Earl of Southesk, and his wife Margaret Arbuthnot, daughter of Sir Robert Arbuthnot.

== Career ==
Carnegie sat in the Parliament of Scotland for Kincardineshire in 1667 and from 1669 until 1674. He was created a Baronet, of Pitcarrow, in the County of Kincardine on 20 February 1663. In 1690 by commission of George Melville, 1st Earl of Melville, Carnegie raised one hundred men to appease rebellious Highlanders in Kincardineshire. As a revenge his estate and his fields were devastated. Carnegie petitioned for compensation, however received never a restitution.

== Family ==
On 29 October 1663, he married firstly Catherine Primrose, daughter of Sir Archibald Primrose, 1st Baronet and had by her five sons and five daughters. She died in 1677, and Carnegie married next Catherine Gordon, daughter of Robert Gordon and widow of Robert Arbuthnot, 2nd Viscount of Arbuthnott, on 29 October 1684. His second wife bore an only son and died in 1692. Carnegie married finally Jean Burnett, daughter of James Burnett about 1696, and had by her three sons and three daughters. He died in 1708 and was succeeded in the baronetcy by his oldest son John.

Baronetage of Nova Scotia
New creation	Baronet (of Pitcarrow); 1663 – 1708	Succeeded by John Carnegie
