= Sir James Carnegie, 5th Baronet =

Scottish politician (1799–1849)

Sir James Carnegie of Kinnaird and of Pitarrow, 5th Baronet DL (1799 – 30 January 1849) was a Scottish politician and de jure 8th Earl of Southesk, 8th Baron Carnegie of Kinnaird and 8th Baron Carnegie of Kinnaird and Leuchars.

== Early life and education ==
Born at Kinnaird, Angus, he was the son of Sir David Carnegie, 4th Baronet and Agnes Murray Elliot, daughter of Andrew Elliot. In 1805 at the age of six, he succeeded his father as baronet. He was educated at home and at Eton College. In 1818, Carnegie began his Grand Tour, first visiting France, Germany and Italy, then Spain and Holland in the following year.

== Career ==
Carnegie entered the British House of Commons in 1830 and sat as Member of Parliament (MP) for Aberdeen Burghs until the following year. He was a Deputy Lieutenant of Forfarshire. In 1847, he petitioned the restoration of the forfeited titles Lord Carnegie and Earl of Southesk, however after assessment by the Committee of Privileges his claim was not followed up.

== Family ==
While again on travels through France and Italy, Carnegie met Charlotte Lysons, second daughter of Reverend Daniel Lysons. They married at the house of the British Ambassador to Italy in Naples on 14 November 1825, and had two daughters and three sons. Carnegie died intestate at Kinnaird Castle, Brechin. His eldest son, James, succeeded to the baronetcy and was later confirmed in his de jure titles.

His third son, Charles, represented Forfarshire in the Parliament of the United Kingdom. His daughter, Lady Charlotte Elliot (married name), was a published poet.

== Sources ==
- Anderson, William (1867), The Scottish Nation: Or the Surnames, Families, Literature, Honours, and Biographical History of the People of Scotland, Vol. III, A. Fullarton & Co.
- Reilly, Catherine W. (2000), Mid-Victorian Poetry, 1860-1879: An annotated biobibliography, Continuum International Publishing Group, ISBN 978-0720123180
- Sage, Lorna; Greer, Germaine; Showalter, Elaine, eds. (1999), The Cambridge Guide to Women's Writing in English, Cambridge University Press, ISBN 978-0521668132

Parliament of the United Kingdom
Preceded by Joseph Hume	Member of Parliament for Aberdeen Burghs; 1830 – 1831	Succeeded by Horatio Ross
Peerage of Scotland
Preceded by David Carnegie	Earl of Southesk de jure 1805 – 1849	Succeeded by James Carnegie
Baronetage of Nova Scotia
Preceded by David Carnegie	Baronet (of Pittarrow); 1805 – 1849	Succeeded by James Carnegie
