= James Carnegie, 3rd Duke of Fife =

British nobleman

His Grace The Duke of Fife
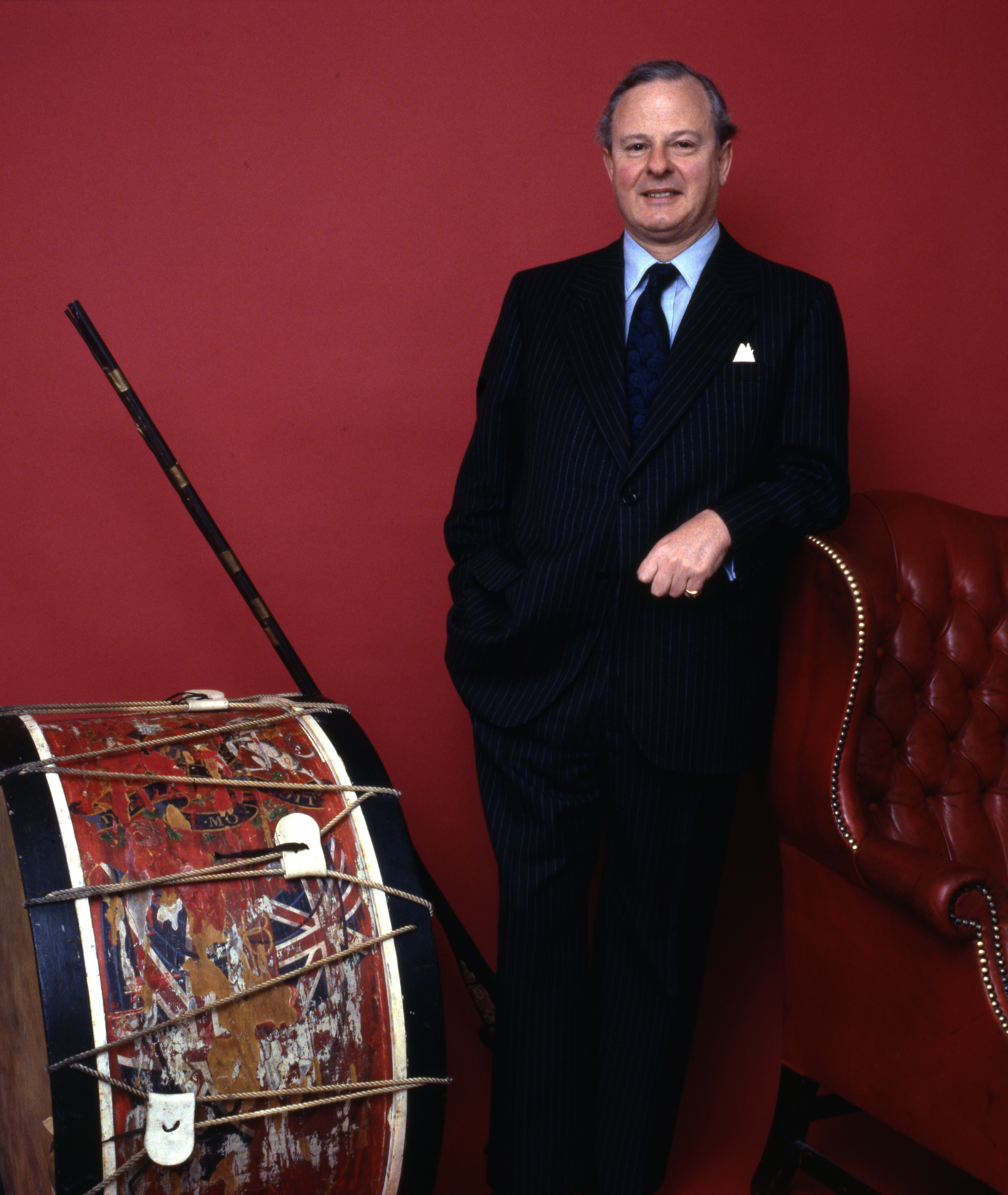
- Portrait by Allan Warren, 1985
- Born: James George Alexander Bannerman Carnegie; 23 September 1929; London, England
- Died: 22 June 2015 (aged 85); Angus, Scotland
- Spouse: Caroline Dewar (m. 1956; div. 1966)
- Issue: Lady Alexandra Etherington; David Carnegie, 4th Duke of Fife
- Parents: Princess Maud; Charles Carnegie, 11th Earl of Southesk

James George Alexander Bannerman Carnegie, 3rd Duke of Fife (23 September 1929 – 22 June 2015) was a British landowner, farmer and peer. He was the grandson of Louise, Princess Royal, a daughter of King Edward VII and Queen Alexandra. As a female-line great-grandson of a British sovereign, he did not carry out royal or official duties or receive any funds from the Civil List. He was the second cousin of Queen Elizabeth II and King Harald V of Norway. Through his maternal grandfather, he was also a descendant of King William IV and Dorothea Jordan.

== Early life ==
The Duke was the only son of the 11th Earl of Southesk (1893–1992) and his wife, Princess Maud (1893–1945), the younger daughter of the 1st Duke of Fife and Louise, Princess Royal. One of his godparents was George V, his mother's maternal uncle, who was represented at the christening by his eldest son and heir, the Prince of Wales.

The Duke was educated at Ludgrove, Gordonstoun School, and at the Royal Agricultural College, Cirencester. He served with the Scots Guards in Malaya in 1948–50. He served as vice patron of the Braemar Royal Highland Society and of the British Olympic Association.

== Duke of Fife ==
The Dukedom of Fife was first granted in 1889 to the Duke's grandfather, the 6th Earl of Fife, by Queen Victoria on his marriage to Princess Louise of Wales, the eldest daughter of the Prince of Wales. In April 1900, the first Duke received a new patent as Duke of Fife and Earl of Macduff in the Peerage of the United Kingdom, this time with a special remainder to his daughters by Princess Louise and their male issue. As the only surviving children of the Duke and Princess Louise were two daughters, the dukedom passed to Princess Alexandra, who became Princess Arthur of Connaught.

On 26 February 1959, the duke succeeded his maternal aunt, Princess Arthur of Connaught, Duchess of Fife, as Duke of Fife and Earl of Macduff, because her only child, Alastair Windsor, 2nd Duke of Connaught and Strathearn, had predeceased her and died without issue. On 16 February 1992 the third Duke also succeeded his father as Earl of Southesk and as chief of the Clan Carnegie.

He lived at Elsick House, on his estate near Stonehaven in Kincardineshire and also farmed the family estate around Kinnaird Castle, Brechin. His interests included sports cars, driving a Ford Zephyr 6 in the 1955 Monte Carlo Rally. He owned a 20,000-acre estate in Angus.

== Tsar Nicholas II ==
In the 1990s, Fife's mitochondrial DNA (mDNA) was used to help identify bones recovered west of Siberia in 1979 as the remains of Tsar Nicholas II of Russia, who was killed in 1918 by the Communists along with his wife and children. Queen Alexandra, the Duke of Fife's maternal great-grandmother, was the older sister of Nicholas II's mother, Dagmar. The test required a female line descendant, as mDNA is passed unchanged from mother to child, unless there is a mutation. In Fife's case, mDNA from Queen Alexandra passed to his grandmother, Louise, Princess Royal, and then to his mother, Princess Maud, and then to him. Fife's mDNA was a 98.5% match with the bones, a rare imperfect match that scientists suspected was caused by a genetic mutation on the Russian side called a heteroplasmy. In 1994, the remains of Nicholas's younger brother, Grand Duke George Alexandrovich, were exhumed in Saint Petersburg. The mDNA from Grand Duke George also revealed the heteroplasmy, confirming the theory of the mutation and conclusive proof that the bones indeed belonged to the last tsar of Russia.

== Marriage and family ==
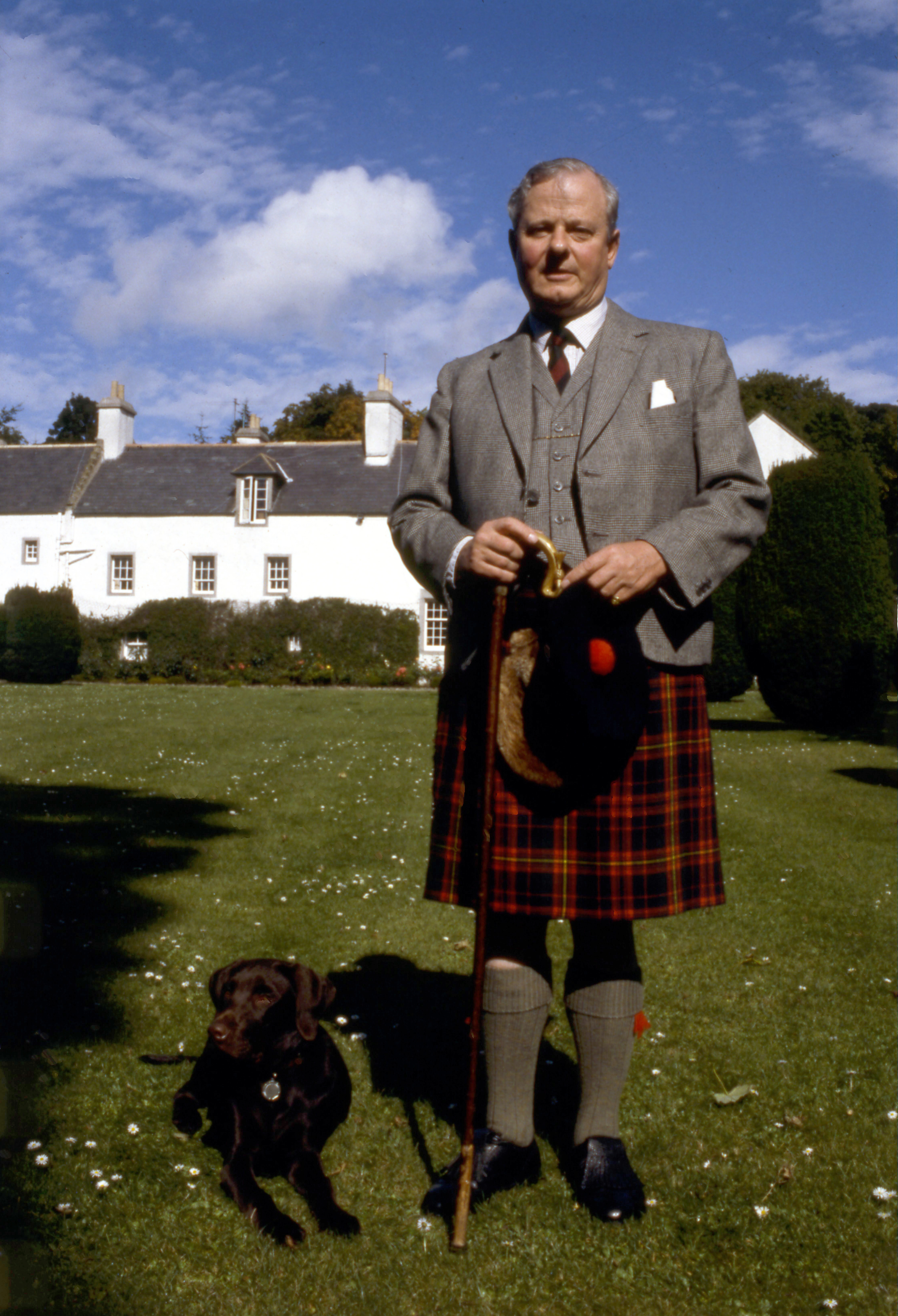
The Duke in front of Elsick House (photograph by Allan Warren, 1984)

As a young man, the Duke's name was variously linked with Princess Margaret, ballerina Mary Drage, and sportswoman Divina Galica.

On 11 September 1956, the then Lord Carnegie married The Hon. Caroline Dewar (born 12 February 1934), the elder daughter of the 3rd Baron Forteviot at St Ninian's Cathedral, Perth, Scotland. Guests at the wedding included Queen Elizabeth the Queen Mother. The reception was held at the Dewar family residence, Dupplin Castle.

The marriage produced two children before they divorced in 1966:

- Lady Alexandra Clare Carnegie (born 20 June 1959), who married Mark Fleming Etherington on 11 May 2001. They have one daughter, Amelia Mary Etherington (born 24 December 2001).
- David Carnegie, 4th Duke of Fife (born 3 March 1961), who married Caroline Anne Bunting on 16 June 1987, and succeeded as the 4th Duke of Fife in 2015. They have three sons, including Charles Duff Carnegie, Earl of Southesk (born 1989), heir to the dukedom.

== Arms ==
Coat of arms of James Carnegie, 3rd Duke of Fife
Coronet A Coronet of a Duke Crest Centre: a Thunderbolt proper winged Or (Carnegie); Dexter: a Knight denoting the ancient MacDuff armed at all points on a Horse in full speed in his dexter hand a Sword erect all proper his Jupon Argent on his sinister arm a Shield Or charged with a Lion rampant Gules the visor of his helmet shut over which on a Wreath of his liveries with a long Mantling flowing therefrom behind him and ending in a Tassel of the fourth doubling of the third is set a Lion rampant issuing out of a Wreath of the third and fourth the Caparisons of the horse Gules fimbriated Or and thereon six Shields of the last each charged with a Lion rampant of the fourth (Dukedom of Fife); Sinister: a Man in armour issuing from the loins and wearing a Tabard emblazoned of the arms Argent on a Fess between three Boars' Heads erased Gules three Mascles Or sustaining with his dexter hand a Banner developed Argent having a Canton Azure charged with a Saltire of the first (Ethel, Countess of Southesk) Escutcheon Quarterly: 1st, Or a Lion rampant Gules armed and langued Azure (Dukedom of Fife); 2nd, the arms of the United Kingdom as borne by King Edward VII differenced by a Label of five points Argent the points charged with two Thistles between three Crosses of St George Gules (The Princess Royal, Duchess of Fife); 3rd, grandquarterly: 1st and 4th, Vert a Fess dancetty Ermine between a Hart's Head cabossed in chief and two Escallops in base Or (Duff of Braco); 2nd and 3rd, Gules three Skeans paleways Argent hafted and pommelled Or surmounted by as many Wolves' Heads couped of the third (Skene of that Ilk); 4th, Gules a Banner displayed Argent charged with a Canton Azure a Saltire of the second (Bannerman of Elsick); over all ensigned of an Earl's Coronet proper an Inescutcheon Argent an Eagle displayed Azure armed beaked and membered Gules on its breast an Antique Covered Cup Or (Carnegie) Supporters Dexter: a Lion rampant guardant Gules langued Azure collared with a Label of five points Argent the points charged with two Thistles between three Crosses of St George Gules; Sinister: a Talbot Argent collared Gules the Collar charged with a Label of three points Argent Motto Above the centre crest: Dred God; Above the dexter crest: Deo Juvante; Above the sinister crest: Pro Patria; Beneath the shield: Virtute Et Opera

== See also ==
- Carnegie (disambiguation)

Peerage of the United Kingdom
Preceded by Princess Arthur of Connaught	Duke of Fife; 2nd creation 1959–2015	Succeeded by David Carnegie
Peerage of Scotland
Preceded by Charles Carnegie	Earl of Southesk; 1992–2015	Succeeded by David Carnegie
