= Robert Carnegie, 3rd Earl of Southesk =

Robert Carnegie, 3rd Earl of Southesk (b. before 1649–1688) was a Scottish nobleman.

== Life ==
Commissioned as a captain in Louis XIV's Scottish Guards at Chantilly, Oise, France in 1659, he was later a colonel in the Forfarshire militia. He attended the Parliament of Scotland sporadically in the 1670s but attended more regularly through the 1680s.

In 1666 he was imprisoned in Edinburgh Castle for wounding George Livingston, 3rd Earl of Linlithgow in a duel.

He inherited the earldom from James Carnegie, 2nd Earl of Southesk in 1669.

King James VII of Scotland granted a charter for an area of moorland to the west of Kinnaird, Angus and Farnell, Angus called Monrommon to Carnegie.

== Family ==
Southesk married before 1664, Lady Anna Hamilton, eldest daughter of William Hamilton, 2nd Duke of Hamilton and had issue:

- Charles Carnegie, 4th Earl of Southesk (1661–1699)
- William Carnegie, (1662–1681) killed in Paris during a duel by William Tollemache youngest son of Sir Lionel Tollemache, 3rd Baronet.

Peerage of Scotland
Preceded by James Carnegie	Earl of Southesk; 1669–1688	Succeeded by Charles Carnegie
