= Princess Alexandra, 2nd Duchess of Fife =

Princess Arthur of Connaught (1891–1959)

Princess Alexandra
- Princess Arthur of Connaught; Duchess of Fife
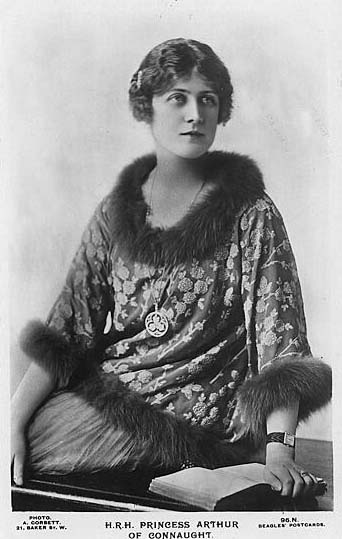
- Photograph, 1918
- Born: Lady Alexandra Victoria Alberta Edwina Louise Duff; 17 May 1891; East Sheen Lodge, Richmond-upon-Thames, Surrey, England
- Died: 26 February 1959 (aged 67); St John's Wood, London, England
- Burial: 3 March 1959; St Ninian's Chapel, Braemar, Scotland
- Spouse: Prince Arthur of Connaught (m. 1913; died 1938)
- Issue: Alastair Windsor, 2nd Duke of Connaught and Strathearn
- Father: Alexander Duff, 1st Duke of Fife
- Mother: Louise, Princess Royal

Princess Alexandra, 2nd Duchess of Fife (born Lady Alexandra Victoria Alberta Edwina Louise Duff; 17 May 1891 – 26 February 1959), known as Princess Arthur of Connaught after her marriage, was the eldest grandchild of Edward VII and also a first cousin of Edward VIII and George VI. Alexandra and her younger sister, Maud, had the distinction of being the only female-line descendants of a British sovereign officially granted both the title of Princess and the style of Highness.

== Lineage and early life ==
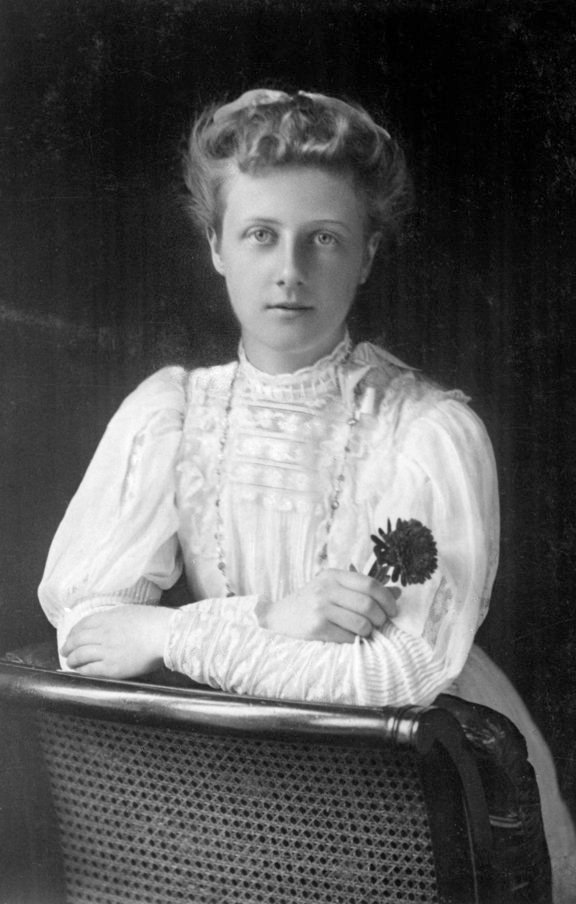
Princess Alexandra

Alexandra's father was Alexander Duff, 1st Duke of Fife. Having succeeded his father as the 6th Earl Fife, he was elevated to Duke of Fife and Marquess of Macduff in the Peerage of the United Kingdom on his marriage in 1889 to Princess Louise of Wales, the eldest daughter of the future Edward VII. Princess Louise accordingly became the Duchess of Fife, and succeeded as the head of many Scottish Feudal Baronies, including MacDuff, named for James Duff, 2nd Earl Fife.

Alexandra was born at East Sheen Lodge, Richmond, Surrey, on 17 May 1891. After ten years of marriage and the birth in 1893 of Alexandra's younger sister Maud, no more children would be born to Alexandra's parents and the dukedom and marquessate of Fife were headed toward extinction since only a male heir could inherit those titles. On 24 April 1900, Queen Victoria granted Alexander Duff a second dukedom of Fife, along with the earldom of Macduff, stipulating by special remainder that these two titles would jointly devolve, in default of sons born to him and the Queen's granddaughter, upon their daughters in order of seniority of birth, and upon their respective agnatic male descendants in the same order. After her father's death in 1912, therefore, she inherited the Dukedom of Fife in her own right.

Although Alexandra was born fifth in line of succession to the British throne, she was not entitled to the title of "Princess" or the style of "Her Royal Highness" because she was a female-line granddaughter of the reigning monarch. Instead, as the daughter of a duke, she was styled Lady Alexandra Duff. Uniquely among British royals, Alexandra and her sister were descended from both King William IV —through his mistress, Dorothea Jordan—and from his niece, Queen Victoria, who inherited the throne due to William IV's lack of legitimate heirs.

She was baptised at the Chapel Royal, St James's Palace on 29 June 1891 by the Archbishop of Canterbury, Edward White Benson. Her godparents were Queen Victoria and the Prince and Princess of Wales.

== Princess ==
On 9 November 1905, King Edward VII declared his eldest daughter Princess Royal. He further ordered Garter King of Arms to gazette Lady Alexandra Duff and her sister Lady Maud Duff with the style and attribute of Highness and the style of Princess prefixed to their respective Christian names, with precedence immediately after all members of the British royal family bearing the style of Royal Highness. From that point, Her Highness Princess Alexandra held her title and rank, not from her ducal father, but from the decree issued by will of the sovereign (her maternal grandfather).

In August 1910, Alexandra became secretly engaged to her first cousin once removed, Prince Christopher of Greece and Denmark, a son of King George I of Greece, the brother of her maternal grandmother Queen Alexandra. The engagement was terminated when their disapproving parents learned of the liaison and forbade the union.

In November 1911, Alexandra and her family were travelling by boat to a winter holiday in Egypt when their liner, the P&O's SS Delhi, ran aground ashore at Cape Spartel in fog and heavy seas. The passengers were rescued, but the rescue boat also sank. Alexandra was struck by a wave in the face and later wrote that she felt the water rush up her nose and swallowed it in gulps. She was rescued by a doctor who pulled her onto the beach. Her sister and mother also nearly died and her father, Alexander Duff, 1st Duke of Fife, subsequently died as a result of his injuries a few weeks later at Aswan.

Because of her position in the Commonwealth's order of succession she served as a Counsellor of State in the 1930s and 1940s.

== Marriage and children ==
In 1910, she was briefly engaged to Prince Christopher of Greece, her first cousin, once removed. (Alexandra's mother, Princess Louise, Duchess of Fife, was a daughter of Queen Alexandra, herself an older sister of George I of Greece, Christopher's father). The engagement was terminated when her furious father learned of the liaison.

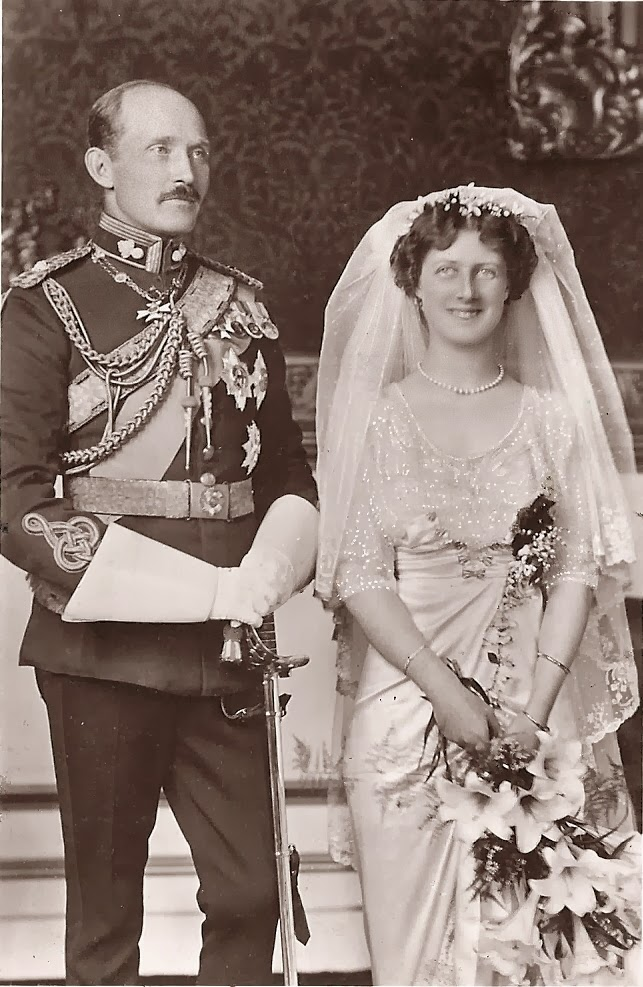
The wedding day of Prince Arthur of Connaught and Princess Alexandra, Duchess of Fife

On 15 October 1913, Princess Alexandra married her first cousin, once removed, Prince Arthur of Connaught at the Chapel Royal, St. James's Palace, London.

The bride's attendants were:

- Princess Maud, the bride's sister.
- Princess Mary of the United Kingdom, the bride's maternal first cousin and daughter of King George V.
- Princess Mary of Teck and Princess Helena of Teck, daughters of Prince Adolphus, Duke of Teck (brother of Queen Mary).
- Princess May of Teck, the bride's maternal second cousin and daughter of Prince Alexander of Teck (brother of Queen Mary) and Princess Alice of Albany.

Prince Arthur of Connaught was the only son of the Duke of Connaught and Strathearn, third son of Queen Victoria and thus a younger brother of her maternal grandfather, King Edward VII.

After their marriage, Alexandra was referred to as HRH Princess Arthur of Connaught, in accordance with the tradition that a wife normally shares the title and style of her husband.

=== Residences ===
Following their marriage the couple initially lived at 54 Mount Street, Mayfair, which Prince Arthur reportedly leased from Robert Windsor-Clive, 1st Earl of Plymouth. They continued to occupy 54 Mount Street until September 1916, when they took a new London residence at No. 17 Hill Street, Mayfair. By January 1920 they were residing at No. 42 Upper Grosvenor Street, Mayfair. Later in the same year they moved to 41 Belgrave Square, which Prince Arthur had reportedly purchased in 1920. 41 Belgrave Square continued to be their London residence until Prince Arthur's death in 1938; the house was subsequently sold to Mrs Edward Baron in 1939.

In November 1938 Princess Alexandra purchased a newly-built house at 64 Avenue Road, St John's Wood, London, where she continued to live until her death.

== Nursing career ==
World War I gave to Princess Arthur an opportunity to embrace her vocation of nursing in which she subsequently made a successful career. In 1915 she joined the staff of St. Mary's Hospital, Paddington, as a full-time nurse and worked in this capacity until the armistice. After the war she continued her training at St. Mary's, becoming a state registered nurse in 1919. She was awarded a first prize for a paper on eclampsia. Princess Arthur also practised at Queen Charlotte's Hospital, specialising in gynaecology, where she received a certificate of merit. Throughout these years Princess Arthur increasingly impressed her superiors by her technical skill and practical efficiency.

When her husband was appointed governor-general of the Union of South Africa in 1920, Princess Arthur accompanied him and shared in his popularity. Her tact and friendliness made her friends among the South Africans, who also admired the interest she displayed in hospitals, child welfare, and maternity work throughout the Union. To these subjects she brought her personal knowledge and experience, which enabled her to make effective and valuable suggestions. Despite this, she found life in South Africa restricting.

On her return to London in 1923, Princess Arthur resumed her nursing career at University College Hospital, where she was known as Nurse Marjorie, and subsequently at Charing Cross Hospital. At this time she specialised in surgery and worked as a theatre sister. She performed minor operations herself, such as an amputation of a patient's thumb. Her services to the nursing profession were recognized in July 1925, when she was awarded the badge of the Royal Red Cross by George V.

The outbreak of World War II in 1939 afforded Princess Arthur further scope for her nursing abilities. She refused the offer of a post as matron of a hospital in the country, preferring to become sister-in-charge of the casualty clearing station of the Second British General Hospital set up to treat the troops retreating from Dunkirk. Shortly thereafter, she opened the Fife Nursing Home in Bentinck Street which she personally equipped, financed, and administered as matron for ten years.

Princess Arthur was the first member of the royal family to register as a nurse with the GNC and was president of the Royal British Nurses Association (RBNA) from 1924 through to the NHS planning and launch years (1946–1948). She remained president until her death in 1959. During this time she was actively engaged with national nursing policy, registration issues, Ministry of Health discussions and legislation affecting nurses. The RBNA archives, held at King's College, London, contain her correspondence with government departments and nursing bodies during this period

On 26 April 1943 her only child, Alastair, Duke of Connaught and Strathearn, died unexpectedly (and in ill-defined circumstances) whilst staying at Rideau Hall in Ottawa with his relative the Governor-General of Canada, the Earl of Athlone.

== Later life and death ==
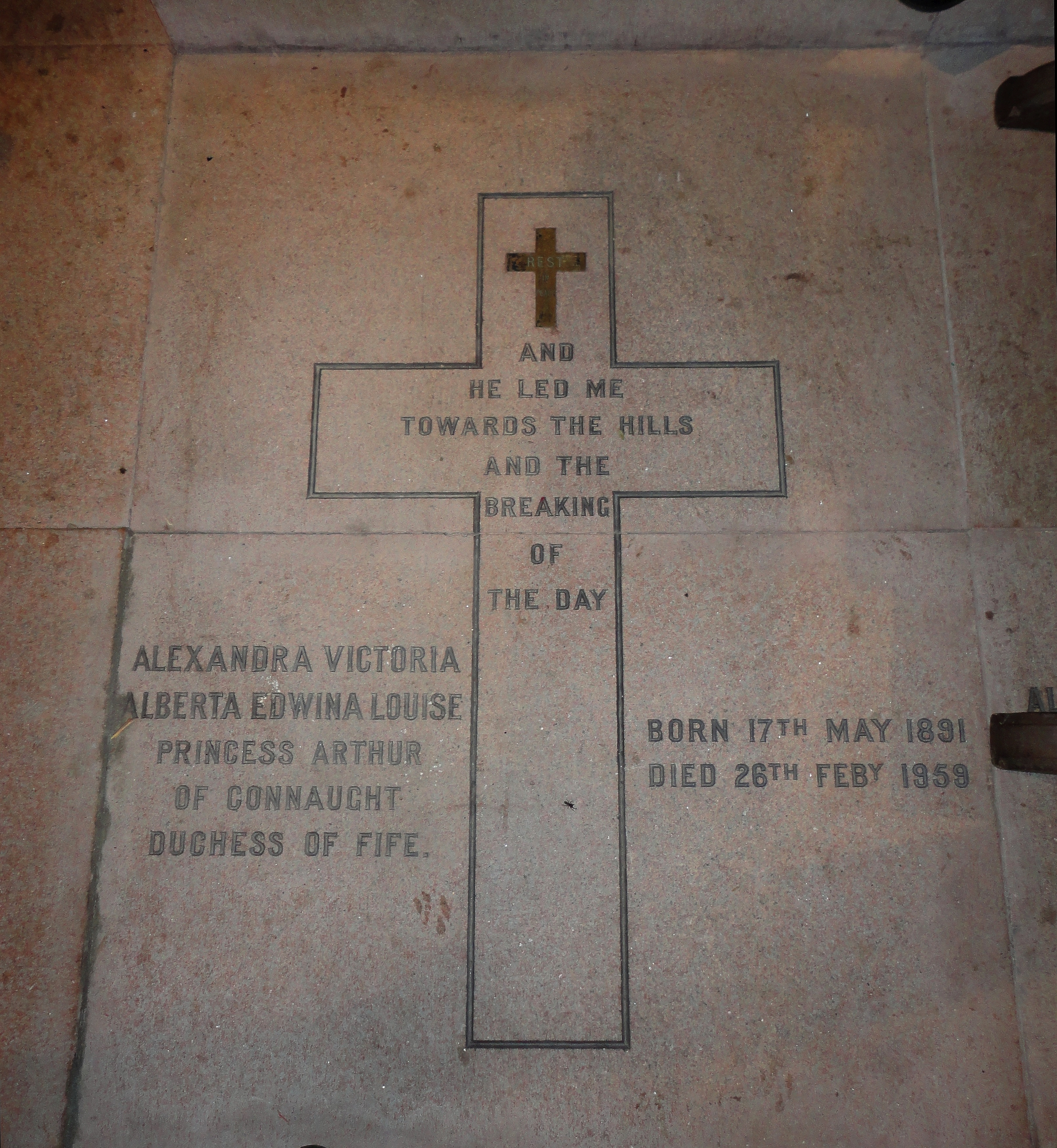
Braemar, Mar Lodge Estate, St Ninian's Chapel – Grave of the 2nd Duchess of Fife (1891–1959)

In 1949 the rheumatoid arthritis, from which Princess Arthur had suffered for many years, rendered her bedbound and so necessitated the closing of her nursing home. She retired to her London home at 64 Avenue Road, St John's Wood, London where she wrote for private circulation two autobiographical fragments in a vivid and entertaining style: A Nurse's Story (1955) and Egypt and Khartoum (1956), in which she gave a graphic account of the shipwreck of SS Delhi. She was engaged on a further volume on big-game hunting in South Africa when she died at home on 26 February 1959 from pneumonia, aged 67.

At her request she was cremated, and her ashes laid in St Ninian's Chapel, Braemar, on the Mar Lodge estate alongside her parents and son. Her will was sealed in London after her death in 1959. Her estate was valued at £86,217 (or £1.4 million in 2022 when adjusted for inflation).

== Titles, styles, honours and arms ==
Coat of arms of Princess Alexandra, 2nd Duchess of Fife

=== Titles and styles ===
Despite the fact that Alexandra and her sister were not daughters of a royal duke, they were sometimes unofficially referred to with the territorial designation of Fife but in official documents, until their marriages, they were always styled Her Highness Princess Alexandra or Maud, without the territorial designation "of Fife".

=== Honours ===
- Royal Red Cross
- Dame Grand Cross of the Most Venerable Order of St John of Jerusalem
- King George VI Coronation Medal

==== Honorary military appointments ====
- Colonel-in-chief, Royal Army Pay Corps

== Ancestry ==
Ancestors of Princess Alexandra, 2nd Duchess of Fife

8. Sir Alexander Duff
4. James Duff, 5th Earl Fife
9. Anne Stein
2. Alexander Duff, 1st Duke of Fife
10. William Hay, 18th Earl of Erroll
5. Lady Agnes Hay
11. Lady Elizabeth FitzClarence
1. Princess Alexandra, 2nd Duchess of Fife
12. Prince Albert of Saxe-Coburg and Gotha
6. Edward VII of the United Kingdom
13. Victoria of the United Kingdom
3. Louise, Princess Royal
14. Christian IX of Denmark
7. Princess Alexandra of Denmark
15. Princess Louise of Hesse-Kassel

== References and notes ==
- Ronald Allison and Sarah Riddell, eds., The Royal Encyclopedia (London: Macmillan, 1991); ISBN 0-333-53810-2
- Marlene A. Eilers, Queen Victoria's Descendants (New York: Atlantic International Publishing, 1987); ISBN 91-630-5964-9
- Alison Weir, Britain's Royal Families: the Complete Genealogy, rev. ed. (London: Pimlico, 1996); ISBN 0-7126-4286-2

Peerage of the United Kingdom
Preceded by Alexander Duff	Duchess of Fife; 2nd creation 1912–1959	Succeeded by James Carnegie
