= Charles Carnegie, 4th Earl of Southesk =

Scottish nobleman

Charles Carnegie, 4th Earl of Southesk (April 7, 1661– August 9, 1699) was a Scottish nobleman. Carnegie attended the University of St Andrews along with his younger brother, William. He married Mary Maitland, daughter of Charles Maitland, 3rd Earl of Lauderdale.

He inherited the earldom from Robert Carnegie, 3rd Earl of Southesk.

Peerage of Scotland
Preceded by Robert Carnegie	Earl of Southesk; 1688–1699	Succeeded by James Carnegie
