= James Carnegie, 5th Earl of Southesk =

Scottish nobleman

James Carnegie, 5th Earl of Southesk (1692–1730) was a Scottish nobleman. He inherited the earldom 14 May 1700. He was attainted of the earldom in 1716.

Peerage of Scotland
Preceded by Charles Carnegie	Earl of Southesk; 1699–1716	Attainted de jure successor James Carnegie
