= Kinnaird Castle, Brechin =

15th-century castle near Brechin in Angus, Scotland

Kinnaird Castle
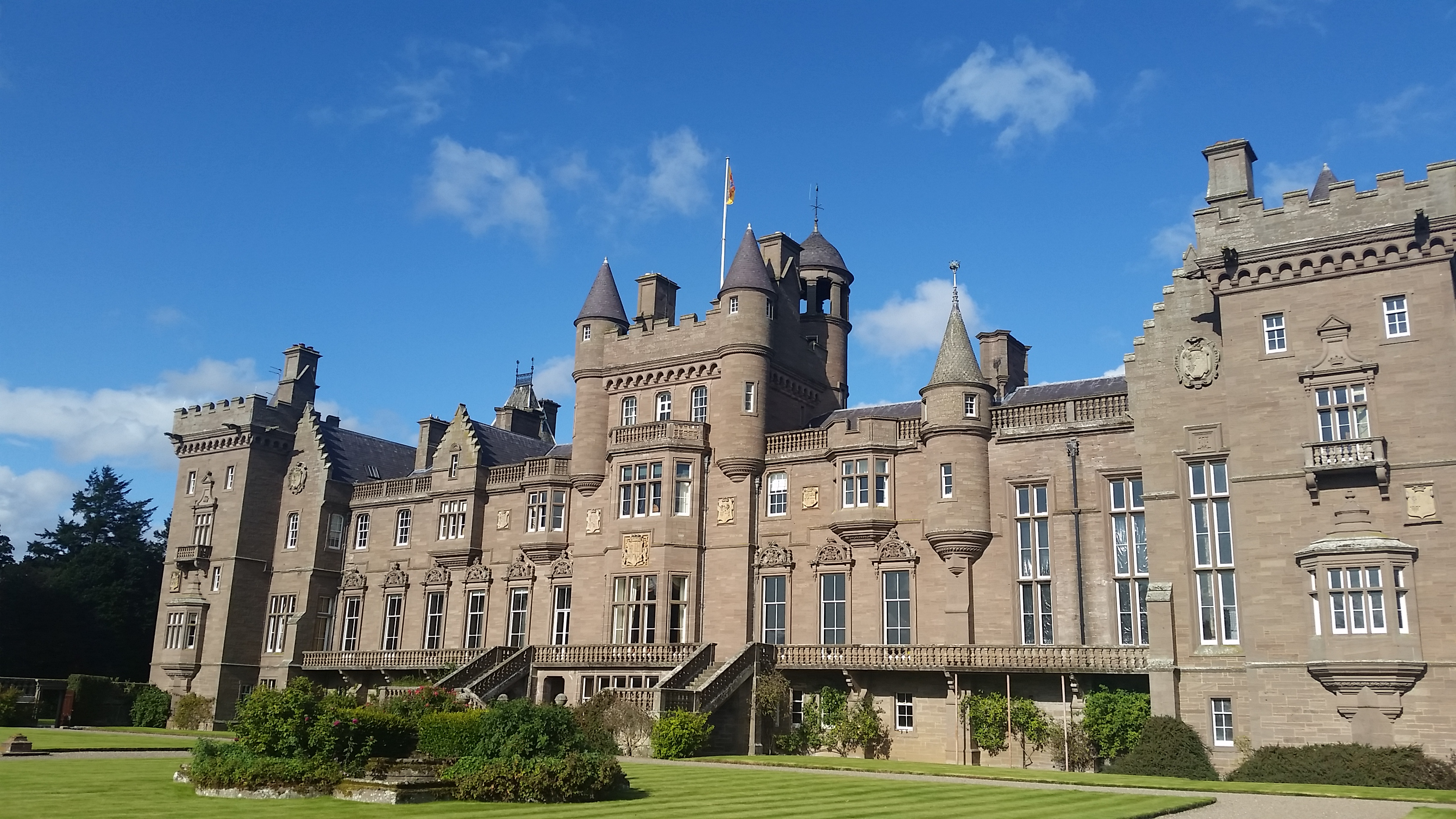
- The castle in 2018

Location
- Coordinates: 56.7043°N 2.5992°W

Site history
- Built: 15th century

Designations

Inventory of Gardens and Designed Landscapes in Scotland
- Official name: Kinnaird Castle
- Designated: 30 June 1987
- Reference no.: GDL00245

Kinnaird Castle is a 15th-century castle near Brechin in Angus, Scotland. The castle has been home to the Carnegie family, the Earls of Southesk, for more than 600 years. It is a Category B listed building and the grounds are included in Inventory of Gardens and Designed Landscapes in Scotland.

== History ==
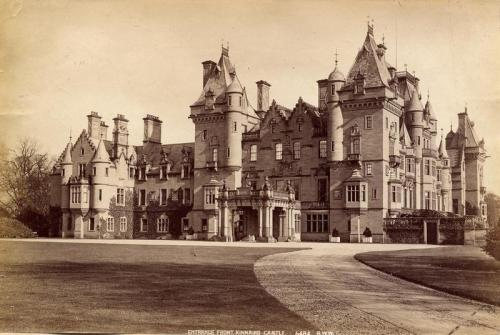
Kinnaird Castle - photographic print

=== 14th century ===
Charters show a mansion had existed on the property.

=== 15th century ===
A castle was listed onsite in 1409, when the estate was granted to the Clan Carnegie. After the Battle of Brechin on 18 May 1452, the castle was burned by Alexander Lindsay, 4th Earl of Crawford as Clan Carnegie had supported King James II of Scotland.

=== 17th century ===
In 1617, King James VI stayed at Kinnaird. Kings Charles I and Charles II also visited the castle. James Graham, 1st Marquess of Montrose spent 3 years at Kinnaird from 1629.

=== 18th century ===
During the winter of 1715, James Francis Edward Stuart (The Old Pretender) spent some time at the castle. As punishment for supporting the Jacobite rising of 1715, the estate was confiscated. The castle was transformed by the architect, James Playfair in 1791 into a large house.

=== 19th century ===
The castle returned to Clan Carnegie ownership in 1855 and was remodeled in Victorian baronial style.

=== 20th century ===
The castle was extensively damaged by a fire in 1921 and was partially rebuilt.

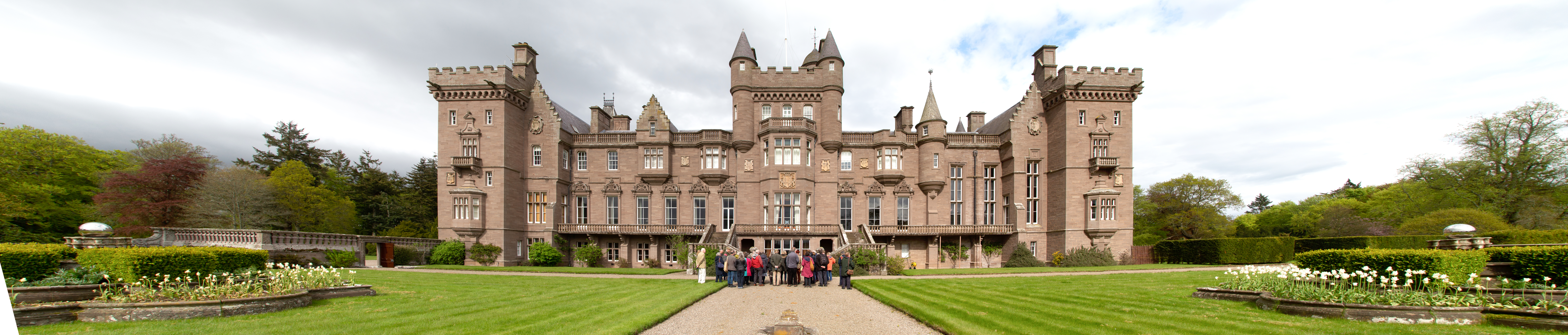
Kinnaird Castle
