= HMS Prince =

Six ships of the Royal Navy have been named HMS Prince, including:

- HMS Prince (1670) was a 100-gun first-rate ship of the line launched in 1670 and renamed HMS Royal William in 1692. Broken up in 1813.
- HMS Prince was a 90-gun second rate launched in 1682 as HMS Ossory. She was renamed HMS Prince in 1705, HMS Princess in 1711 and HMS Princess Royal in 1728. She was broken up in 1773.
- HMS Prince (1750) was a 90-gun second rate launched in 1698 as HMS Triumph. She was renamed HMS Prince in 1714. She was rebuilt in 1750, and broken up in 1773.
- HMS Prince (1788) was a 98-gun second rate launched in 1788. She was rebuilt in 1796 and was broken up in 1837.
- HMS Prince (1854) was a storeship hired in 1854 and lost later that year in the Crimean War.
- HMS Prince (1916) was an Admiralty M-class destroyer launched in 1916 and sold in 1921.

In addition many ships have been named after specific princes, including:

- HMS Prince Albert
- HMS Prince Arthur
- HMS Prince Augustus Frederick
- HMS Prince Consort
- HMS Prince Edward
- HMS Prince Eugene
- HMS Prince Frederick
- HMS Prince George
- HMS Prince Henry
- HMS Prince de Neuchatel
- HMS Prince of Orange
- HMS Prince Regent
- HMS Prince Royal (1610) also known as Royal Prince
- HMS Prince Rupert
- HMS Prince of Wales
- HMS Prince William
- HMS Young Prince

== See also ==
- HMS Princess
