= HMS Princess =

Seven ships of the Royal Navy have been named HMS Princess, HMS Princesse or HMS Princessa:

- HMS Princess (1660) was a 54-gun fourth rate launched in 1660 and broken up in 1680.
- HMS Princess was a 90-gun second rate launched in 1682 as HMS Ossory. She was renamed HMS Prince in 1705, HMS Princess in 1716 and HMS Princess Royal in 1728. She was broken up in 1773.
- HMS Princess (1740) was a 70-gun third rate, originally the Spanish ship Princessa. She was captured in 1740, hulked in 1760 and sold in 1784.
- HMS Princessa (1780) was a 70-gun third rate, originally the Spanish ship Princessa. She was captured in 1780, became a sheer hulk in 1784 and was broken up in 1809.
- HMS Princess (1795) was rated as a 28-gun sixth rate, originally the Dutch East Indiaman Williamstadt en Boetzlaar. She was captured on 18 August 1795 at the Capitulation of Saldanha Bay, and became a 26-gun floating battery in 1800. She was sold in 1816.
- HMS Princess (1915) was the former SS Kronprincess Cecilie, launched in 1905. Captured in 1914, she was renamed as Princess and used as a dummy for HMS Ajax.
- HMS Princess (1939) was a hired patrol vessel which sank in 1940 after a collision

In addition, many ships have been named after specific princesses, including:

- HMS Princess Alice
- HMS Princess Amelia
- HMS Princess Anne
- HMS Princess Augusta
- HMS Princess Carolina
- HMS Princess Caroline
- HMS Princess Charlotte
- HMS Princess Louisa
- HMS Princess Margaret
- HMS Princess Maria
- HMS Princess Mary
- HMS Princess of Orange
- HMS Princess Royal
- HMS Princess Sophia Frederica
