= Louise, Princess Royal =

British princess (1867–1931)

Louise
- Princess Royal; Duchess of Fife
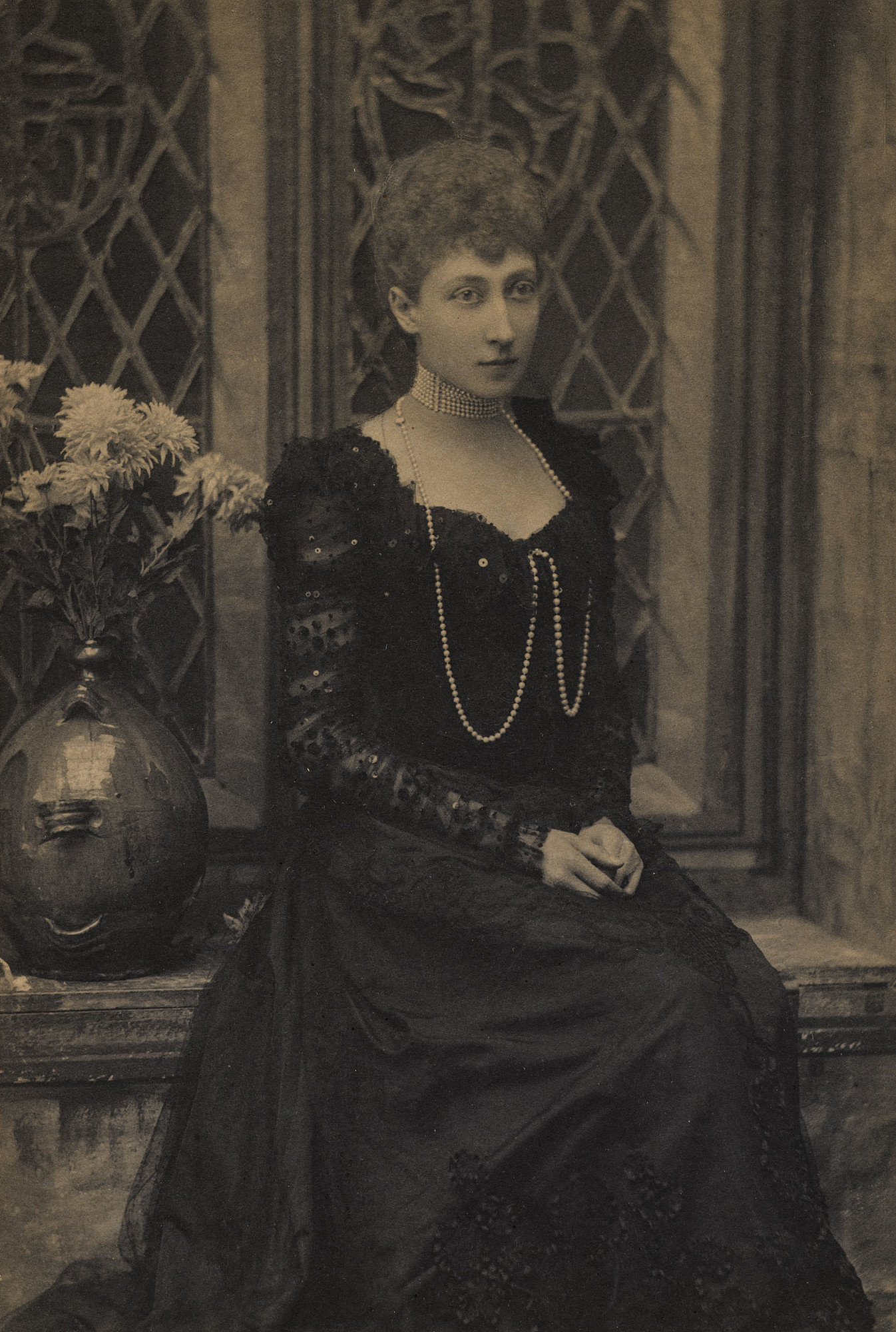
- Portrait by Alice Hughes, c. 1899
- Born: Princess Louise of Wales; 20 February 1867; Marlborough House, London, England
- Died: 4 January 1931 (aged 63); Portman Square, London, England
- Burial: 10 January 1931; Royal Vault, St George's Chapel, Windsor Castle; 22 May 1931; St Ninian's Chapel, Braemar
- Spouse: Alexander Duff, 1st Duke of Fife (m. 1889; died 1912)
- Issue: Alastair Duff, Marquess of Macduff; Princess Alexandra, 2nd Duchess of Fife; Princess Maud, Countess of Southesk
Names
- Louise Victoria Alexandra Dagmar
- House: Windsor (from 1917); Saxe-Coburg and Gotha (until 1917)
- Father: Edward VII
- Mother: Alexandra of Denmark

Louise, Princess Royal (Louise Victoria Alexandra Dagmar; 20 February 1867 – 4 January 1931) was the third child and eldest daughter of King Edward VII and Queen Alexandra of the United Kingdom. She was a younger sister of King George V. Louise was granted the title of Princess Royal in 1905. Known for her reserved and quiet nature, she remained a low-profile member of the royal family throughout her life.

== Early life ==
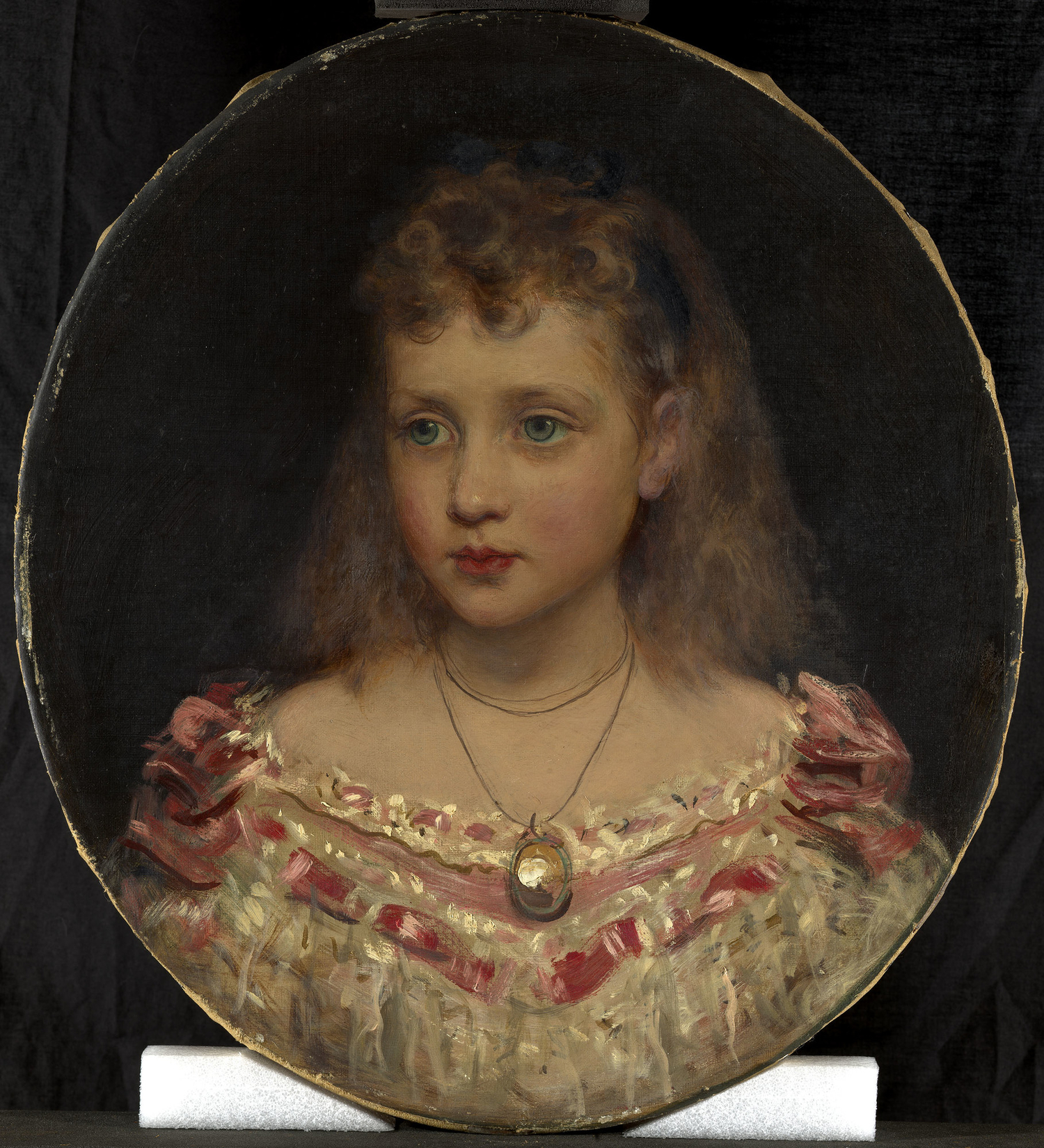
Portrait of Louise by James Sant, 1872

Louise was born at 6:30 am on 20 February 1867 at Marlborough House, the London residence of her parents, Albert, Prince of Wales (later Edward VII), and Alexandra, Princess of Wales (later Queen Alexandra). Her father was the eldest son of Queen Victoria and Prince Albert, and her mother was the eldest daughter of Christian IX and Queen Louise of Denmark. She was named Louise Victoria Alexandra Dagmar, after her maternal grandmother Queen Louise; her paternal grandmother, Queen Victoria; her mother, Alexandra; and her aunt, the Tsesarevna of Russia. From birth, as a male-line granddaughter of the British monarch, she had the title Her Royal Highness Princess Louise of Wales. She was baptised at Marlborough House on 10 May by Charles Longley, Archbishop of Canterbury. (Note: Her godparents were her paternal aunts – Alice, Princess Louis of Hesse, Helena, Princess Christian of Schleswig-Holstein and Princess Louise, Duchess of Argyll; her paternal uncle (by marriage), Crown Prince Frederick William of Prussia; her first cousin once removed – Grand Duchess Augusta of Mecklenburg-Strelitz; her maternal granduncle – Prince Frederick William of Hesse-Kassel (or Hesse-Cassel); her maternal grandmother: Queen Louise of Denmark; her children, Louise's uncle, George I of Greece; and aunt, The Tsarevna of Russia; Karl, Duke of Schleswig-Holstein-Sonderburg-Glücksburg; and Prince Edward of Saxe-Weimar-Eisenach.)

Her birth occurred under difficult circumstances. Her mother had been seriously ill with rheumatic fever late in pregnancy, making Louise's arrival precarious and causing concern for both mother and child. Although both survived, her mother was left with a permanent limp. Louise herself was regarded as a delicate child and was frequently unwell. The Wales children were raised largely at Marlborough House and Sandringham, where they enjoyed a relatively informal and happy childhood. In her youth, Louise was described as a very withdrawn girl.

Louise and her sisters, Princess Victoria and Princess Maud were educated at home under private tutors and studied guitar under Catharina Pratten. They were noted for spirited and playful behaviour, often engaging in pillow fights and other "unladylike pastimes." Their mother's strong influence meant the girls remained close to home.

As a child, Louise accompanied her mother and siblings on several extended family visits to Copenhagen and to Bernstorff Palace, where her mother had grown up. Like her sisters, she was a bridesmaid at the wedding of her paternal aunt Princess Beatrice to Prince Henry of Battenberg in 1885.

Louise was an accomplished musician and sometimes played the organ during services at St Mary Magdalene Church, Sandringham. She was known within the family as Lulu or Toots.

== Marriage and children ==
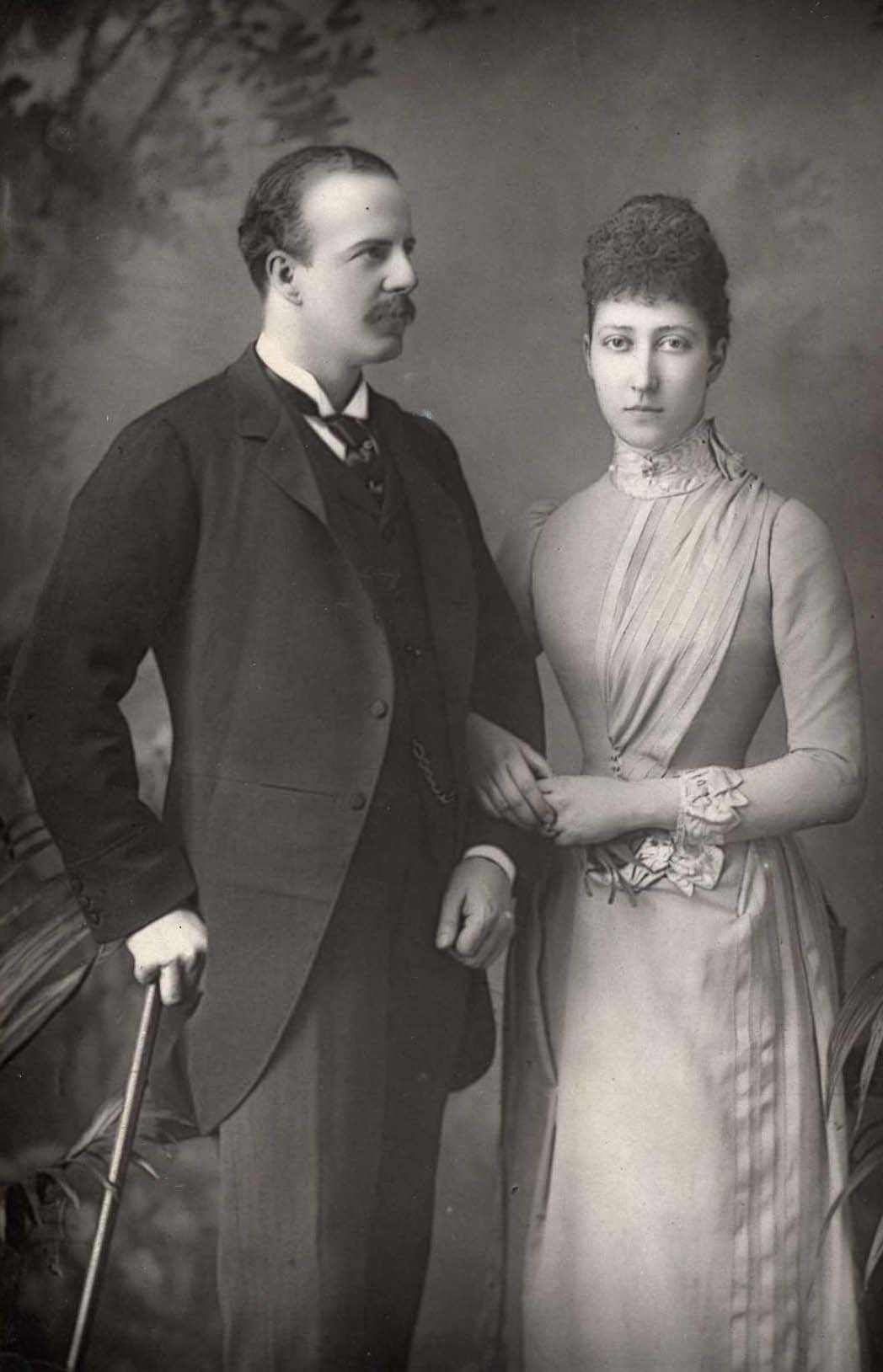
Louise and Alexander in 1889

As daughter of the Prince of Wales, Louise was regarded as a highly desirable match. She had grown tired of her over‑protective mother and longed for independence, yet without making a "grand marriage" to a European prince, following the example of her aunt the Duchess of Argyll, who had married outside royalty. Louise was introduced to Alexander Duff, 6th Earl of Fife, at the wedding of her aunt Beatrice in 1885. He was a regular companion of her father and 18 years her senior. Four years later, she asked her grandmother Queen Victoria for permission to marry him, insisting that if she were not allowed to marry him she would surely die an old maid.

Queen Victoria recorded in her journal that she gladly gave her consent: "I was much pleased, and readily gave my consent, and kissed her and wished her all possible happiness." Their engagement was announced in June 1889. There was criticism at court, where it was thought improper for a princess to marry someone not of royal blood. Princess Victoria Mary of Teck wrote to her aunt Augusta, Grand Duchess of Mecklenburg-Strelitz, that "for a future Princess Royal to marry a subject seems rather strange." Alexander was a very wealthy landowner; he inherited the Duff family estates in Scotland, which included large tracts of land in Aberdeenshire. At his death, he held about 249,000 acres.

Despite her mother's attempts to keep her daughters unmarried and by her side, on 27 July 1889 Louise married Alexander in the Private Chapel at Buckingham Palace, with the Archbishop of Canterbury officiating at the service. They were third cousins through an illegitimate line, as Alexander was a great-grandchild of William IV and his mistress Dorothea Jordan. Her bridesmaids were Maud and Victoria, Victoria Mary of Teck, Marie Louise and Helena Victoria of Schleswig-Holstein, and the Countesses Feodora, Helena and Valda Gleichen. "O Perfect Love, all human thought transcending", was written by Dorothy Blomfield for her sister's marriage in 1883 and was intended to be sung to Strength and Stay in Hymns Ancient & Modern, No. 12. It was subsequently set as an anthem by J. Barnby for the marriage of Louise and Alexander that day. The Duchess of Teck wrote soon after the wedding, "They both seem so thoroughly happy and contented that it does one's heart good to see them."

Louise was the first of the Prince of Wales's children to marry; this union, combined with the approach of the 25th birthday of her elder brother Prince Albert Victor of Wales, prompted a formal request from the Queen to the Prime Minister for financial provision to be made from the Civil list for both Louise and her brother. This ultimately lead to the enactment of the Prince of Wales's Children Act 1889.

Two days after the wedding, Queen Victoria created Alexander Duke of Fife and Marquess of Macduff in the Peerage of the United Kingdom. The letters patent creating this dukedom contained the standard remainder to heirs male of the body lawfully begotten. After the birth of their two daughters, on 24 April 1900, Queen Victoria signed letters patent creating a second Dukedom of Fife, along with the Earldom of Macduff in the Peerage of the United Kingdom, with a special remainder: in default of a male heir, these peerages would pass to the daughters of the 1st Duke, and then to their male descendants.

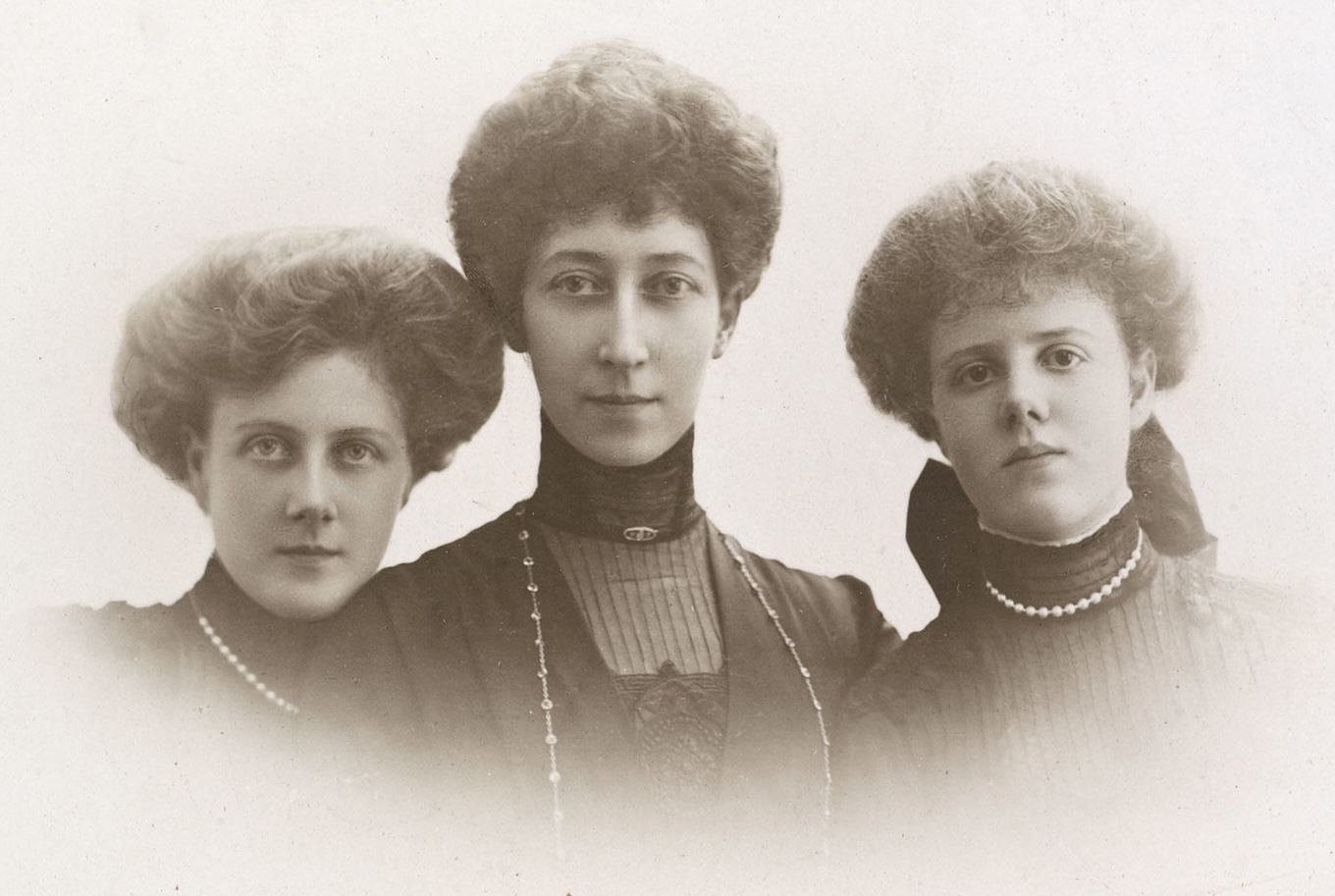
Louise with her daughters, Maud and Alexandra, 1911

Louise and Alexander had three children:

- Alastair Duff, Marquess of Macduff (stillborn 16 June 1890)
- Princess Alexandra, 2nd Duchess of Fife (17 May 1891 – 26 February 1959); married her first cousin once removed Prince Arthur of Connaught (13 January 1883 – 12 September 1938), and had issue.
- Princess Maud (3 April 1893 – 14 December 1945); married Charles Carnegie, 11th Earl of Southesk, and had issue.

=== Family homes and interests ===
Despite the age difference, the couple were happily married. They spent much time in Scotland, where Louise participated in leisure activities such as salmon fishing. Before her marriage, her principal artistic pursuits were music and the family hobby of photography. After her marriage, she developed a previously untapped talent for painting and interior design, which she first applied in planning the interior decoration of Fife House. When a plumber's candle accidentally caused a fire that destroyed the original Mar Lodge, the new Mar Lodge, comprising 120 rooms, was constructed from a rough sketch drawn by Louise and further elaborated by their architect.

Though happiest in the countryside, Louise was an avid theatre and opera-goer when in London. She supported the performing arts throughout her life and, in her youth at Balmoral, took part as an amateur actress in many plays and tableaux vivants. On one occasion, she was coached by Ellen Terry.

Louise and Alexander made their main home at Mar Lodge, a sporting lodge built for them by Alexander Marshall Mackenzie. They owned Fife House in Brighton, where they sometimes lived, and East Sheen Lodge in Richmond from 1889 until they sold the Lodge in 1908.

==== London residence ====
In the lead-up to their marriage, Alexander purchased the lease of a London townhouse at 15 Portman Square, London in July 1889. Louise continued to live at 15 Portman Square following her husband's death in 1912 until her own death in 1931, after which a large auction of the contents of the house was held in February 1932. In December 1933, newspapers reported that Louise's younger daughter, Maud, had agreed to loan the house for an exhibition of English needlework in aid of the Artists' Benevolent Institution, to be held during February and March 1935. The houses at 15 to 18 Portman Square were demolished in 1935, and a large apartment building was constructed on the site by May 1936.

== Princess Royal ==
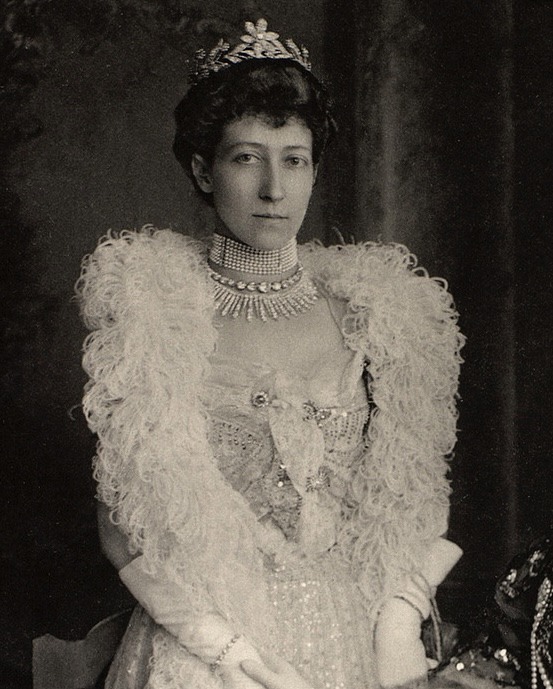
Louise in 1905

On 9 November 1905, Edward VII created Louise the Princess Royal, the highest honour bestowed on a female member of the royal family, succeeding her aunt, Victoria, German Empress, who died in 1901. At the same time, the King declared that the two daughters of Louise would be styled as princesses, with the style and attribute of "Highness" and with precedence immediately after all members of the royal family bearing the style of "Royal Highness".

In November 1905, Louise inaugurated the King's Labour Tents in Kingsway, London, a charitable initiative organised by the Church Army to provide temporary employment, food, and shelter to unemployed and destitute men. The tents offered men the opportunity to earn modest wages or meals by performing simple manual labour, such as preparing firewood, while also providing basic lodging and sustenance. Accompanied by Alexander, Louise visited the tents, spoke with the men, and sampled the soup provided, demonstrating her personal engagement with social welfare and her support for the Church Army's work in alleviating poverty in London.

In August 1910, Louise's daughter Alexandra secretly became engaged to Prince Christopher of Greece and Denmark. Upon hearing the news, Alexander disapproved of the match and forbade the union. On 15 October 1913, Alexandra married Louise's first cousin, Prince Arthur of Connaught.

Louise was noted for her steady involvement in charitable and public-service work throughout her life. She supported a wide range of organisations, taking a particular interest in the activities of the Church Army and serving as patron of the Alexandra Girls' Club. In addition to her regular charitable visits and engagements, she held roles in several civic and philanthropic bodies, including serving as President of the London branch of the British Red Cross Society and supporting groups such as the Theatrical Ladies' Guild, the Greater London Fund for the Blind, the RSPCA, and the British and Foreign Sailors' Society. She also served as patron of the Ladies' Association in aid of Princess Christian's Fund for the Deaf and Dumb, a charitable organisation established under her aunt, Princess Christian. Although known for her generally reserved public profile, she maintained a consistent commitment to charitable causes.

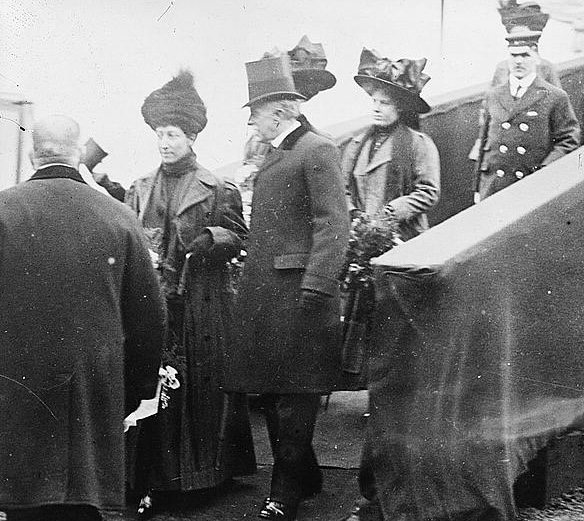
Louise at the launch of the battlecruiser HMS Princess Royal, April 1911

In 1911, Louise served as Lady Sponsor of the battlecruiser HMS Princess Royal, taking part in its ceremonial launch by breaking a bottle of champagne on the ship's bow. During the First World War, she supported the armed forces, including presenting a Union Jack flag and shield, given by the League of Empire, to Australian troops stationed in England at Wellington Barracks on 29 July 1916.

Louise became Colonel-in-Chief of the 7th Dragoon Guards in June 1914, a regiment historically tied to the title "Princess Royal." Earlier, on 5 April 1906, she presented a new regimental standard to the 7th Dragoon Guards, the first occasion on which a Princess Royal attended a parade of the regiment. The 7th Dragoon Guards were merged with the 4th Dragoon Guards in 1922; as the 4th had no Colonel‑in‑Chief, Louise accepted the position for the combined 4th/7th Dragoon Guards on 20 November 1922 and remained in the post until her death. The next Colonel‑in‑Chief of the regiment was the Duchess of Kent, appointed in 1977.

Louise held a strong association with Braemar, Scotland, through her marriage to Alexander. He donated part of his Mar Estate to provide a permanent venue for the Braemar Gathering, one of Scotland's most prestigious Highland Games. Louise was patron of the Braemar Royal Highland Society and annually attended these events, along with other members of the royal family. The grounds were later named the Princess Royal and Duke of Fife Memorial Park in recognition of the Fife family.

On 12 December 1911, she attended the coronation of her brother King George V. Later that month, while sailing aboard the P&O's SS Delhi to Egypt, Louise and her family were shipwrecked off the coast of Morocco. She and her husband refused to leave until all the women and children had been rescued and were among the last to depart. During the rescue, Louise lost her jewel case, and both Alexandra and Maud were thrown into the sea by a large wave. Although they were otherwise unharmed, Alexander fell ill with pleurisy, probably contracted as a result of the shipwreck. He died at Assuan, Egypt, in January 1912, and Alexandra succeeded to his dukedom, becoming Duchess of Fife in her own right.

== Later life and death ==
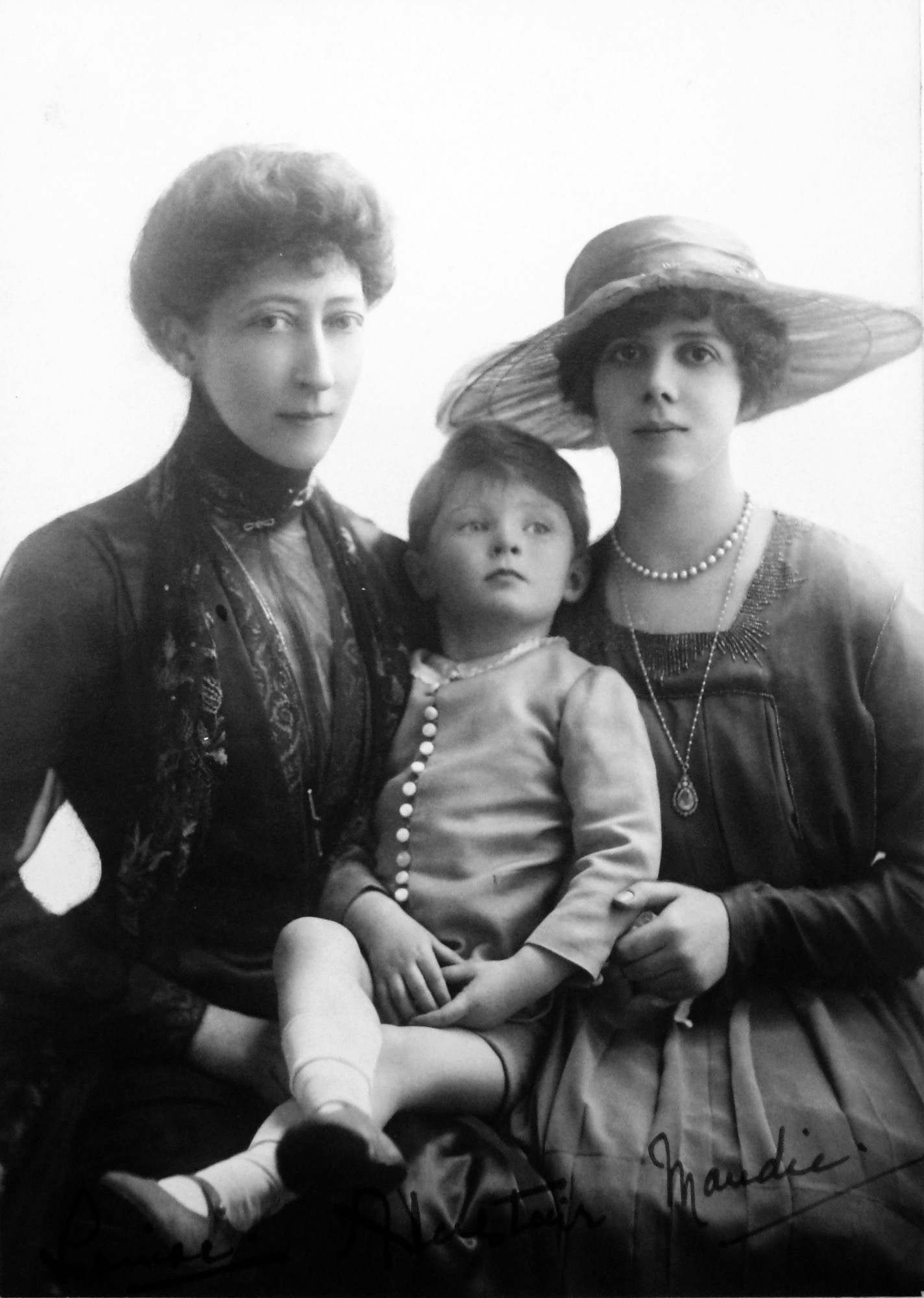
Louise with her daughter Maud and grandson Alastair, 1918

After the death of her husband, Louise led a reclusive life, yet remained an active member of the royal family. She divided her time between Mar Lodge in Braemar and her London residence at Portman Square. In her later years, Louise faced financial difficulties stemming from the mismanaged affairs of her family friend Horace Farquhar, 1st Earl Farquhar, who had been involved in investments connected to the Fife family. In his final years Farquhar reportedly suffered mental decline, and when he died in 1923 his estate was found to be disordered and heavily indebted. Although not legally liable, Louise sold part of her art collection, including several Romneys, as well as furnishings from her London residence, to protect her finances and the family's reputation.

In later life, Louise suffered from recurring gastric haemorrhages, including serious attacks in April 1925 and October 1929 at Mar Lodge, and was brought back to London for nursing care at her home in Portman Square, where she was largely confined to bed. Her last letter to Queen Mary spoke of going out in the morning and then returning to bed. Spending so much time resting, she was grateful for the regular gifts of flowers, "which make my room so light."

In December 1930, shortly before her death, Louise made one final public engagement by presenting badges at the Haymarket Theatre to members of the Theatrical Ladies' Guild, an organisation of which she was patron.

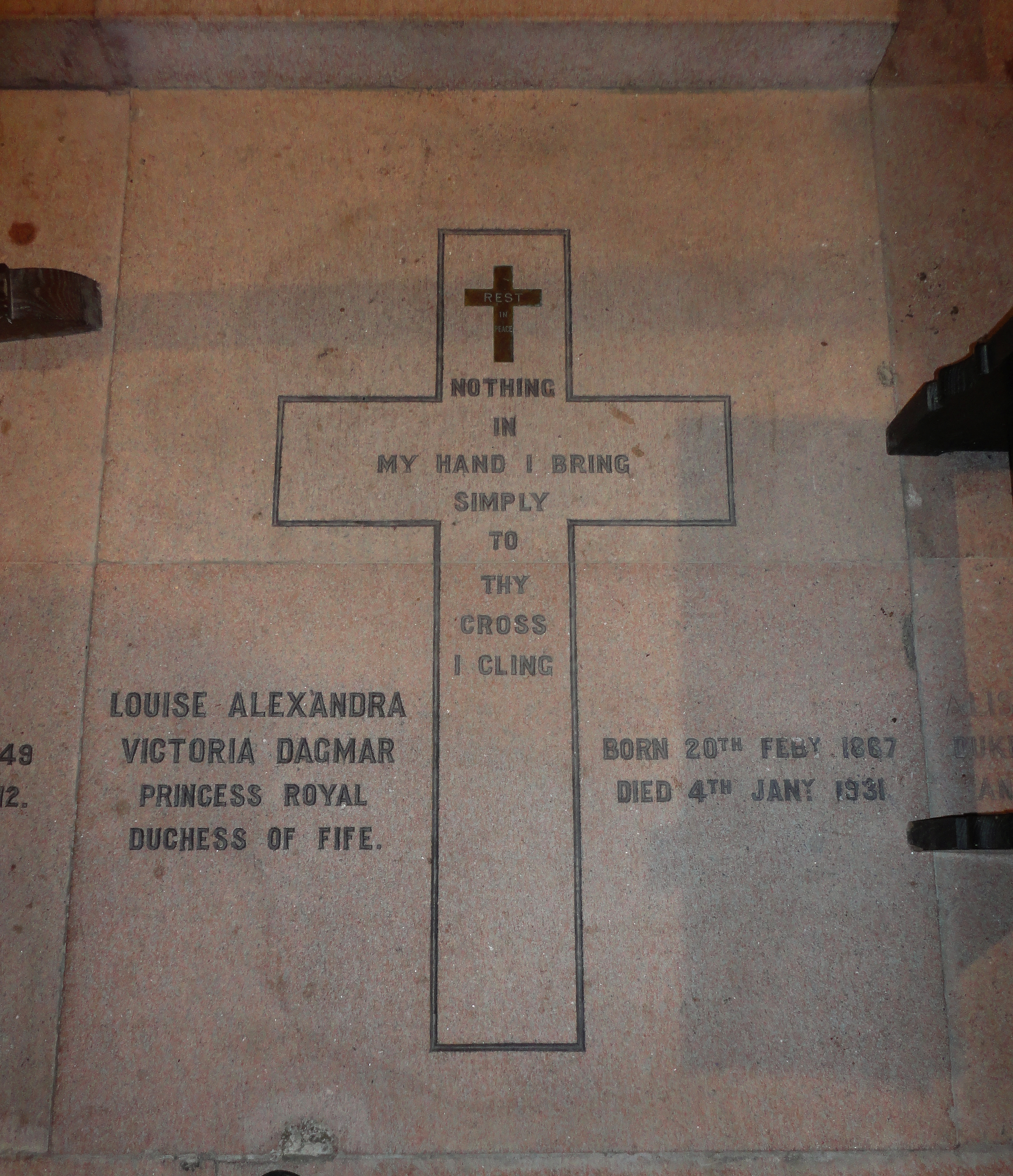
Louise's grave in St Ninian's Chapel, Braemar

On 4 January 1931 at 2:30 pm, Louise died in her sleep at her home at 15 Portman Square, London, with her two daughters, Alexandra and Maud, at her bedside. She was 63 years old. Per her death certificate, her cause of death was attributed to valvular heart disease leading to heart failure. She was 10th in line to the throne at the time of her death. Her sister Victoria saw her death as a release and wrote to their sister Maud; "Louise suffered so terribly these last few months that one can but thank God. She is at peace with her dear ones. But it's sad for us, and the loss of a sister comes very near one's heart."

A simple funeral took place at St. George's Chapel, Windsor Castle, on 10 January 1931. The funeral was the first burial service to be held in the chapel since its restoration. A Scots Guards piper led the procession, playing "The Lament", while six non-commissioned officers of the 4th/7th Dragoon Guards, of which Louise had been Colonel-in-Chief, bore her coffin. It was draped with the Union Jack and adorned with arum lilies and white heather tied with the Duke of Fife's tartan. King George V, Queen Mary, the Prince of Wales, the Duke and Duchess of York, and other members of the Royal Family were present as the Dean of Windsor pronounced the words "Grant us safe lodging, holy rest, and peace at last." At Louise's own request, the organ played the triumphal march from Verdi's Aida as her coffin was lowered into the royal vault beneath the chapel. Her remains were later removed to the Private Chapel, Mar Lodge, Braemar, Aberdeenshire. Her will was sealed and her estate was valued at £46,383 (or £2.2 million in 2022 when adjusted for inflation).

== Honours and arms ==
- 1885: Royal Order of Victoria and Albert
- 6 August 1887: Imperial Order of the Crown of India
- 1929: Dame Grand Cross of the Venerable Order of St John of Jerusalem (GCStJ)
  - 1888–1929: Lady of the Venerable Order of St John of Jerusalem (LJStJ)

=== Honorary military appointments ===
- 1911: Lady Sponsor of HMS Princess Royal
- 1914: Colonel-in-chief of the 7th Dragoon Guards
- 1922: Colonel-in-chief of the 4th/7th Royal Dragoon Guards

=== Arms ===
Upon her marriage, Louise was granted a coat of arms, being the Royal Arms of the United Kingdom with an inescutcheon for Saxony, all differenced with a label argent of five points, the outer pair and centre bearing crosses gules, and the inner pair bearing thistles proper. The inescutcheon was dropped by royal warrant in 1917.

Princess Louise's coat of arms until 1917

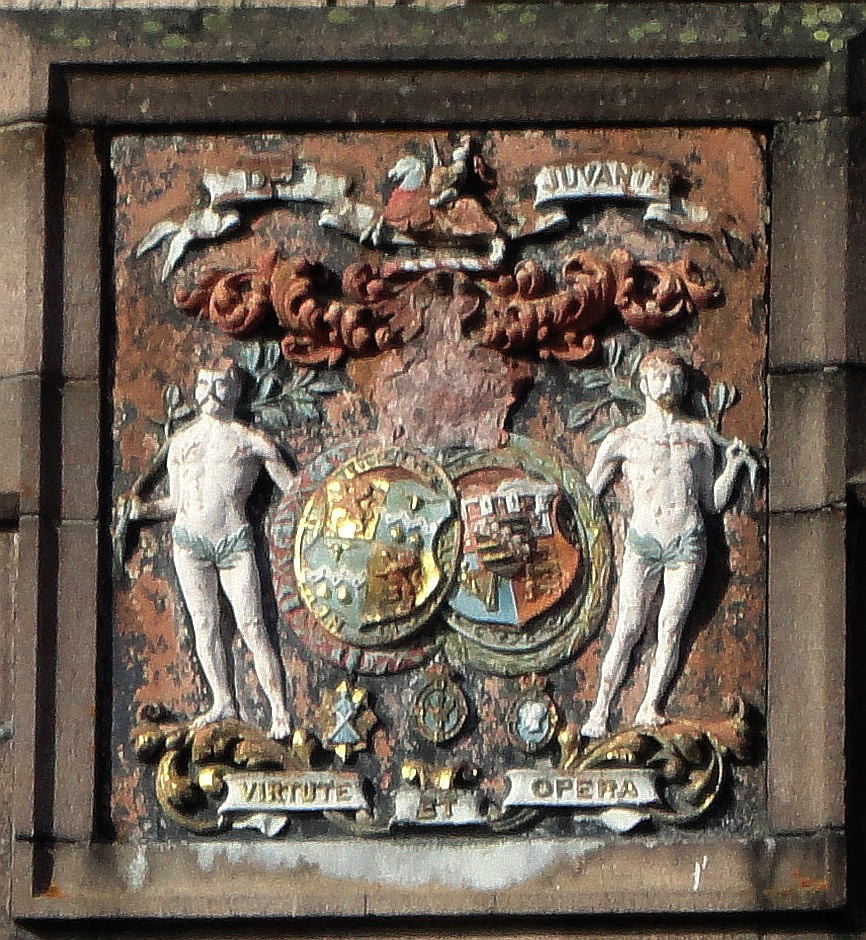

Fife Arms Hotel, Braemar: Arms of the Duke and Duchess of Fife

== Ancestors ==
Ancestors of Louise, Princess Royal

8. Ernest I, Duke of Saxe-Coburg and Gotha
4. Prince Albert of Saxe-Coburg and Gotha
9. Princess Louise of Saxe-Gotha-Altenburg
2. Edward VII of the United Kingdom
10. Prince Edward, Duke of Kent and Strathearn
5. Victoria of the United Kingdom
11. Princess Victoria of Saxe-Coburg-Saalfeld
1. Louise, Princess Royal
12. Frederick William, Duke of Schleswig-Holstein-Sonderburg-Glücksburg
6. Christian IX of Denmark
13. Princess Louise Caroline of Hesse-Kassel
3. Princess Alexandra of Denmark
14. Prince William of Hesse-Kassel
7. Princess Louise of Hesse-Kassel
15. Princess Charlotte of Denmark

== Notes ==
Louise, Princess Royal House of Saxe-Coburg and Gotha Cadet branch of the House of Wettin Born: 20 February 1867 Died: 4 January 1931
British royalty
Vacant Title last held by Victoria, German Empress	Princess Royal; 1905–1931	Vacant Title next held by Princess Mary, Countess of Harewood
