= Prince (ship) =

Several vessels have been named Prince.

- Prince (1785 ship), of 52, or 56, or 70 tons (bm), was launched in 1785 at Liverpool, for the slave trader John Dawson. She first appeared in Lloyd's Register (LR), in the issue for 1786 with Molineux, master, Dawson, owner, and trade Liverpool–Africa. Initially she may have served as a feeder vessel, trading captives on the African coast but without making the Middle Passage, i.e., without carrying captives from Africa to the West Indies. In 1790, Prince, James Hunter, master made her first voyage transporting enslaved people in the triangular trade. In 1790–1791 she made a second voyage transporting enslaved people. In 1791, Prince, Thomas Nixon, master, made a third voyage transporting enslaved people. She was lost in late 1792 or in 1793 homeward bound after she had landed her captives at Kingston, Jamaica.
- Prince (1787 ship) was launched at Bristol in 1785 as Alexander and then made two complete voyages as a slave ship in the triangular trade in enslaved people. Her owners changed her name to Prince in 1787. As Prince, she made six more complete voyages transporting enslaved people. She sailed for owners in Bristol, Liverpool, and London. She foundered in 1800 as she was returning to England from her ninth voyage transporting enslaved people, having delivered captives to Jamaica.

== See also ==
- HMS Prince – one of six vessels of the Royal Navy of that name
