= Thomas Grundy (sculptor) =

British sculptor and master mason

Thomas Grundy (died 1829) was a British sculptor and master mason who was builder of many of Sir John Soane's projects.

== Life ==
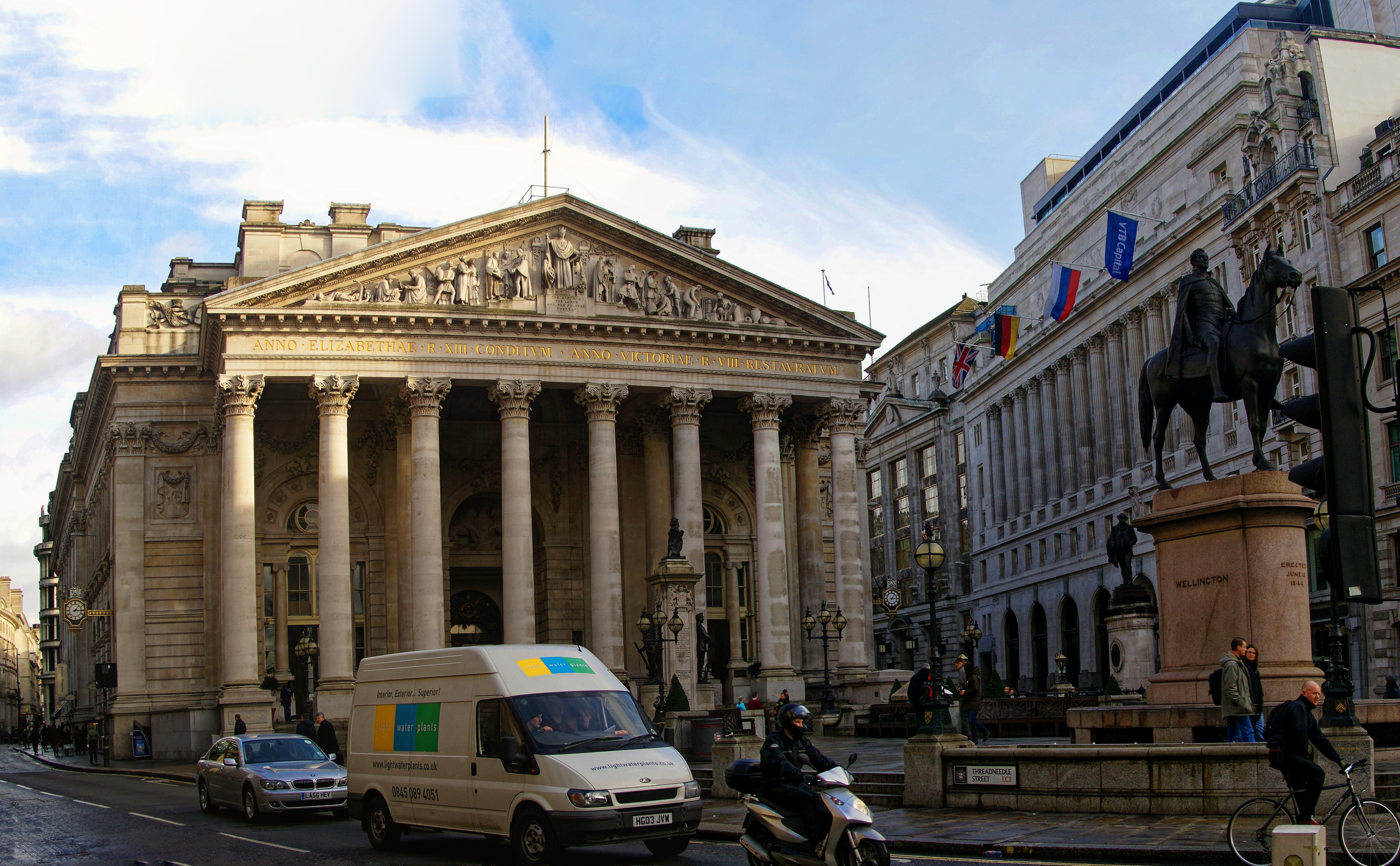
Bank of England on Threadneedle Street

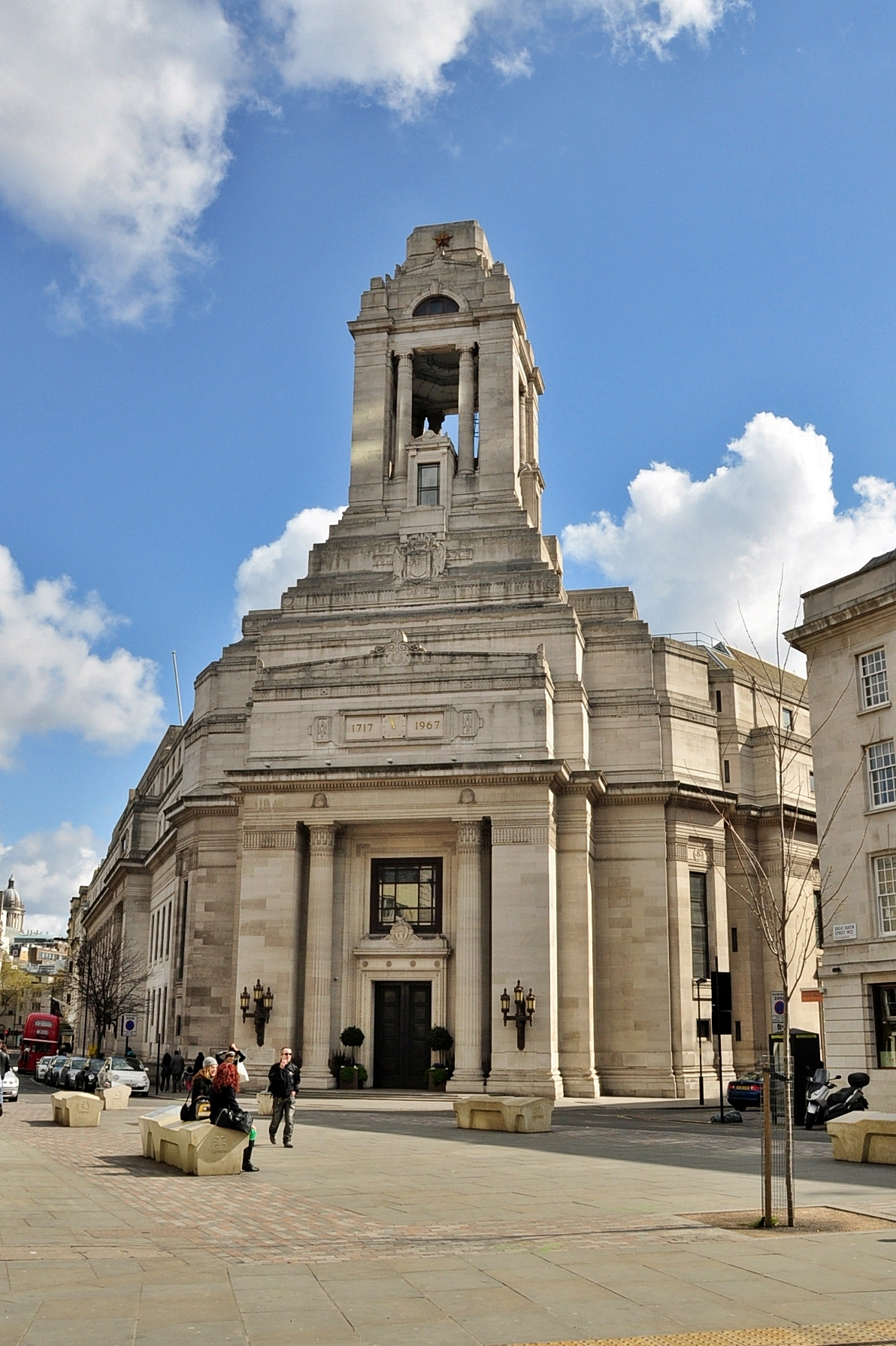
Freemasons' Hall, London

Grundy was probably born in or near London around 1775. He trained as a stonemason in London and became a Freeman of the Worshipful Company of Masons in 1802. From around 1810 he worked with Sir John Soane, who employed him on many projects.

Working with Soane became one of the principal builders for the Bank of England in 1807, building both their head office in Threadneedle Street, but also their main banks in England's other main cities.

== Collections ==
His work is in the collection of the Sir John Soane's Museum.

He died in London in 1829.

== Main projects ==
- Sarcophagus for the body of Francis Bourgeois to design of Soane (1807)
- Bank of England, Threadneedle Street (1807-1829) with Soane the "Old Soane"
- Monument to Signora Ann Storace (sister of Stephen Storace) in Lambeth Parish Church (1818) destroyed in remodelling
- House of Lord St Germans on St James's Square (1818) with Soane
- House of Samuel Thornton (MP) on St James's Square (1819) with Soane
- Fife House for Lord Liverpool the Prime Minister (c. 1813)
- Four houses on Regent Street (1821)
- New Courts of Juducature in Westminster (1825) for Soane
- Pell Wall Hall near Market Drayton for Purney Sillitoe (1826) also working with John Carline both under Soane
- Bank of England head branch in Bristol (1827)
- Freemasons' Hall, London (1828)
- Bank of England head branch in Liverpool (1828)
- Bank of England in Hull (1828)
- Bank of England in Newcastle-upon-Tyne (1828)
- Bank of England in Norwich (1829)

== Family ==
His wife Jane Grundy carried on the business after his death.
