= Henry Dawes =

Henry Dawes may refer to:

- Henry Dawes (Royal Navy officer) (d. 1667), captain in the English Royal Navy
- Henry L. Dawes (1816–1903), U.S. Senator and U.S. Representative
- Henry M. Dawes (1877–1952), American businessman and banker
