= The Theatrical Guild =

- Formation: 1891
- Founder: Kittie Carson
- Type: Charity
- Legal status: Registered charity
- Purpose: Welfare support for theatre staff
- Headquarters: London, United Kingdom
- Region served: United Kingdom
- Website: https://ttg.org.uk/

The Theatrical Guild (originally the Theatrical Ladies' Guild) is a charitable organisation in the United Kingdom that provides welfare support to theatre workers, particularly those working backstage and in front-of-house roles. The Guild offers grants, financial assistance, counselling, training, and other support to theatre staff facing illness, financial hardship, or personal emergencies.

== History ==
There is a long history of the theatre industry and charity culture being closely connected. The Theatrical Guild was founded in 1891 by actress Kittie Carson to support women in the theatre who were particularly vulnerable after losing employment due to pregnancy or illness. The Guild formed part of a wider network of women-led theatrical organisations that emerged to address economic insecurity among performers. Initially focused on female performers, it later expanded to include men and non-performing staff. In 2001, the charity formally adopted the name The Theatrical Guild to reflect this broader remit.

Princess Louise, Princess Royal, was a prominent patron of the charity, and regularly attended events.

== Organisation ==
The Theatrical Guild is a registered charity in England and Wales (charity number 206669), governed by a Board of Trustees responsible for overseeing its activities, grant allocation, and strategic direction.

The Guild provides financial aid, welfare support, and training to theatre workers including stage technicians, costume staff, set designers, and front-of-house employees. It is particularly known for supporting those without permanent employment, helping workers in precarious positions to maintain their livelihoods.

The Guild is recognised as a key support organisation for theatre staff across the United Kingdom. The Association of British Theatre Technicians identifies the Guild as one of the sector's principal support organisations. It has been associated with high-profile events, including being the official charity of the 2011 WhatsOnStage Awards.
