= Actors' Orphanage =

The Actors' Orphanage was started in 1896 and established as the Actors' Orphanage Fund in 1912. The fund continues but the orphanage closed in 1958.

== History ==
The charity was started in 1896 by "Kittie" Carson and Mrs Clement Scott The first building was in Croydon. It was established as the Actors' Orphanage Fund in 1912.

In 1915 the Orphanage moved to Langley Hall at Langley (was in Buckinghamshire - now in Berkshire). The orphanage was both a home and a school to approximately 60 children. At ages 15–17 pupils sat the School Leaving Certificate of Cambridge University and if 10 subjects were taken to Matriculation.

The home and school was moved to Silverlands at Chertsey, Surrey in 1938 where it remained until 1940. In September 1940 the Orphanage was evacuated to the USA where the children were housed in New York City at the Edwin Gould Foundation, and the children were sent to local schools.

After the war ended the Fund established a home (once again at Silverlands, Chertsey). This arrangement ended in 1958 when the costs became too high and the Actors' Orphanage ceased to exist. The remaining children were moved to new houses in Hemel Hempstead Road, Watford. Some were placed in private schools.

Over the years many from the theatrical profession gave time and money to the running of the Orphanage. Past presidents of the Orphanage included Sir Gerald du Maurier, Noël Coward, Sir Laurence Olivier and Richard Attenborough.

The 1912 fund was re-established as the Actors' Charitable Trust and financial and care help was offered to those in need. It continues to exist today as ACT, the Actors' Children's Trust, awarding £750,000 in grants each year to the children of professional actors.
