= The Stage =

British entertainment media outlet

- The Stage magazine [2024]
- Type: Online, app and monthly magazine
- Format: Web, media company, tablet
- Owner: The Stage Media Company Limited
- Founder: Charles Lionel Carson
- Publisher: The Stage Media Company Limited
- Editor: Matthew Hemley
- Founded: 1 February 1880; 146 years ago (as The Stage Directory – a London and Provincial Theatrical Advertiser)
- Language: English
- Headquarters: Stage House, 47 Bermondsey Street, London SE1 3XT
- Circulation: 400,000 per month (online); 20,000 per week (print readership)
- ISSN: 0038-9099
- Website: thestage.co.uk

The Stage is a British monthly magazine and website covering the entertainment industry and particularly theatre of the United Kingdom. Founded in 1880, The Stage contains news, reviews, opinion, features, and recruitment advertising, mainly directed at those who work in theatre and the performing arts.

== History ==
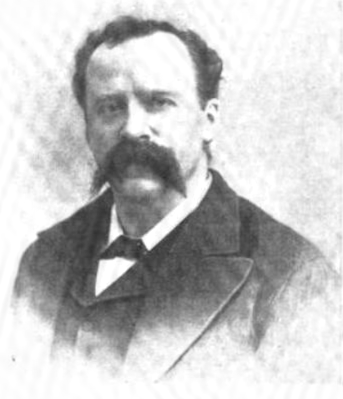
Charles Lionel Carson

The first edition of The Stage was published (under the title The Stage Directory – a London and Provincial Theatrical Advertiser) on 1 February 1880 at a cost of three old pence for twelve pages. Publication was monthly until 25 March 1881, when the first weekly edition was produced. At the same time, the name was shortened to The Stage and the publication numbering restarted at number 1.

The publication was a joint venture between founding editor Charles Lionel Carson and business manager Maurice Comerford. It operated from offices opposite the Theatre Royal, Drury Lane. Carson, whose real name was Lionel Courtier-Dutton, was cited as the founder. His wife Emily Courtier Dutton later founded several theatrical charities.

The Stage entered a crowded market, with many other theatre titles (including The Era) in circulation. Undercutting their rivals, Carson and Comerford dropped the price of the paper to one penny; soon it became the only remaining title in the field.

The newspaper has remained in family ownership. Upon the death in 1937 of Charles Carson's son Lionel, who had assumed the joint role of managing director and editor, control passed to the Comerford family.

In 1959, the newspaper was renamed The Stage and Television Today, incorporating the Television Today pull-out supplement dedicated to broadcasting news and features. Derek Hoddinott, who was the existing TV editor of The Stage, was retitled as editor of the Television Today supplement. The overall name and pull-out supplement remained until 1995, when broadcasting coverage was re-incorporated into the main paper. The name on the masthead reverted to The Stage, but in 2006, the paper introduced a blog concentrating on television, named TV Today.

From 1995, the newspaper has awarded The Stage Awards for Acting Excellence at the Edinburgh Festival Fringe.

In 2004, 96-year-old contributor Simon Blumenfeld was recognised by Guinness World Records as the world's oldest weekly newspaper columnist. The column continued until shortly before his death in 2005.

The Stage Awards were launched in 2010. They are given annually and recognise outstanding organisations working in theatre and beyond in the following categories: London theatre, regional theatre, producer, school, fringe theatre, theatre building, unsung hero and international.

In August 2013, The Stage launched The Stage Castings, an online casting service with a video audition function.

In May 2019, The Stage partnered with the Andrew Lloyd Webber Foundation and UK Theatre to launch Get Into Theatre, a website dedicated to theatre careers.

It was announced in November 2025 that The Stage would become a monthly magazine, instead of a weekly newspaper, from January 2026.

== Careers started via The Stage ==
In 1956, writer John Osborne submitted his script for Look Back in Anger in response to an advertisement by the soon-to-be-relaunched Royal Court Theatre.

Dusty Springfield responded to an advertisement for female singers in 1958.

Harold Pinter gained his first job after responding to an advert and Kenneth Branagh landed the lead in The Billy Trilogy, in the BBC Play for Today series, after it was advertised in the paper.

The creation of Internationalist Theatre by Angelique Rockas was first announced in the Stage editorial in April 1981.

Ricky Tomlinson responded to an ad for United Kingdom, another Play for Today, in 1981 and Sandi Toksvig landed her first television job playing the part of Ethel in No. 73 after answering an ad in The Stage.

Television presenter Maggie Philbin won her first major role, as a co-presenter of Multi-Coloured Swap Shop, after answering an advertisement in The Stage.

A number of pop groups have recruited all or some of their members through advertisements placed in the newspaper, most notably the Spice Girls in 1994, Scooch in 1998 and 5ive in 1997. Lee Mead (the actor who won BBC One talent show Any Dream Will Do to gain the lead role in Joseph and the Amazing Technicolor Dreamcoat) got his first professional job, working on a cruise ship, through a recruitment ad in the paper.

Television presenter Ben Shephard auditioned for GMTV children's show Diggit following an advert in The Stage. While he did not get the part, he met Andi Peters, who subsequently hired him for the Channel 4 youth strand T4.

Charles Dance landed his first role in a Welsh theatre, and Alexandra Burke stated in an interview "My mum used to buy The Stage all the time for auditions for me. That's how I got to go on [BBC TV talent show] Star for a Night with Jane McDonald."

Olivier Award-winning actor Sharon D. Clarke found her first role at Battersea Arts Centre through an audition advert in the paper.

Lisa Scott-Lee revealed that pop band Steps were formed through an advert in The Stage.

Michael Caine stated in an interview with Steve Wright on BBC Radio 2 that at the beginning of his career he applied for acting roles he found in The Stage.

== Editors ==
- 1880–1901: Charles Carson
- 1901–1904: Maurice Comerford
- 1904–1937: Lionel Carson
- 1937–1943: Bernard Weller
- 1943–1952: S. R. Littlewood
- 1952–1972: Eric Johns
- 1972–1992: Peter Hepple
- 1992–1994: Jeremy Jehu
- 1994–2014: Brian Attwood
- 2014–2017: Alistair Smith (print); Paddy Smith (online)
- 2017–2026: Alistair Smith
- 2026–present: Matthew Hemley

== Digital archive ==
The paper's full content from 1880–2007 is available digitally via subscription.

== Quotations ==
- "The moment you have arrived in the profession is when you realise you don't have to read The Stage" – Noël Coward (attributed)
- "The stage would not be the stage without The Stage" – Laurence Olivier (The Stage, 25 October 1976)
