= HMS Princess Royal =

Five ships of the Royal Navy have been named HMS Princess Royal:

- HMS Princess Royal (1728) was a 90-gun second rate launched in 1682 as HMS Ossory. She was renamed HMS Prince in 1705, HMS Princess in 1716 and HMS Princess Royal in 1728. She was broken up in 1773.
- HMS Princess Royal (1739) was the former East Indiaman of the same name that the Navy purchased in 1739 and used first as a hospital ship and then as a 24-gun storeship, before selling her in 1750.
- HMS Princess Royal (1773) was a 90-gun second-rate launched in 1773. She was rearmed to 98 guns in 1800, and then 74 guns in 1807, before being broken up in 1807.
- HMS Princess Royal (1853) was a 91-gun screw-propelled second-rate, originally to have been named HMS Prince Albert. She was launched in 1853 and sold in 1872.
- HMS Princess Royal (1911) was a Lion-class battlecruiser launched in 1911 and sold in 1922.

== Battle honours ==
Ships named Princess Royal have earned the following battle honours:

- Genoa, 1795
- Baltic, 1854
- Crimea, 1855
- Heligoland, 1914
- Dogger Bank, 1915
- Jutland, 1916

== See also ==
- Princess Royal (ship)
- HMS Princess
- Post Office Packet Service for an account of the packet Princess Royal's successful resistance against a French privateer.
