= HMS Princess Amelia =

Three ships of the Royal Navy have borne the name HMS Princess Amelia, after either Princess Amelia, daughter of George II or Princess Amelia, daughter of George III. Another ship was planned but never completed:

- HMS Princess Amelia was an 80-gun third rate launched in 1693 as HMS Humber. She was renamed HMS Princess Amelia in 1727 and was broken up in 1752.
- HMS Princess Amelia was an 80-gun third rate launched in 1693 as HMS Norfolk. She was renamed HMS Princess Amelia in 1755 and was broken up in 1757.
- HMS Princess Amelia (1757) was an 80-gun third rate launched in 1757. She was loaned to HM Customs in 1788 and sold in 1818.
- HMS Princess Amelia was to have been a 74-gun third rate. She was laid down in 1799 and cancelled in 1800.

== See also ==
- HMS Amelia
- HMS Princess
- Post Office Packet Service packet ship Princess Amelia
