= HMS Princess Caroline =

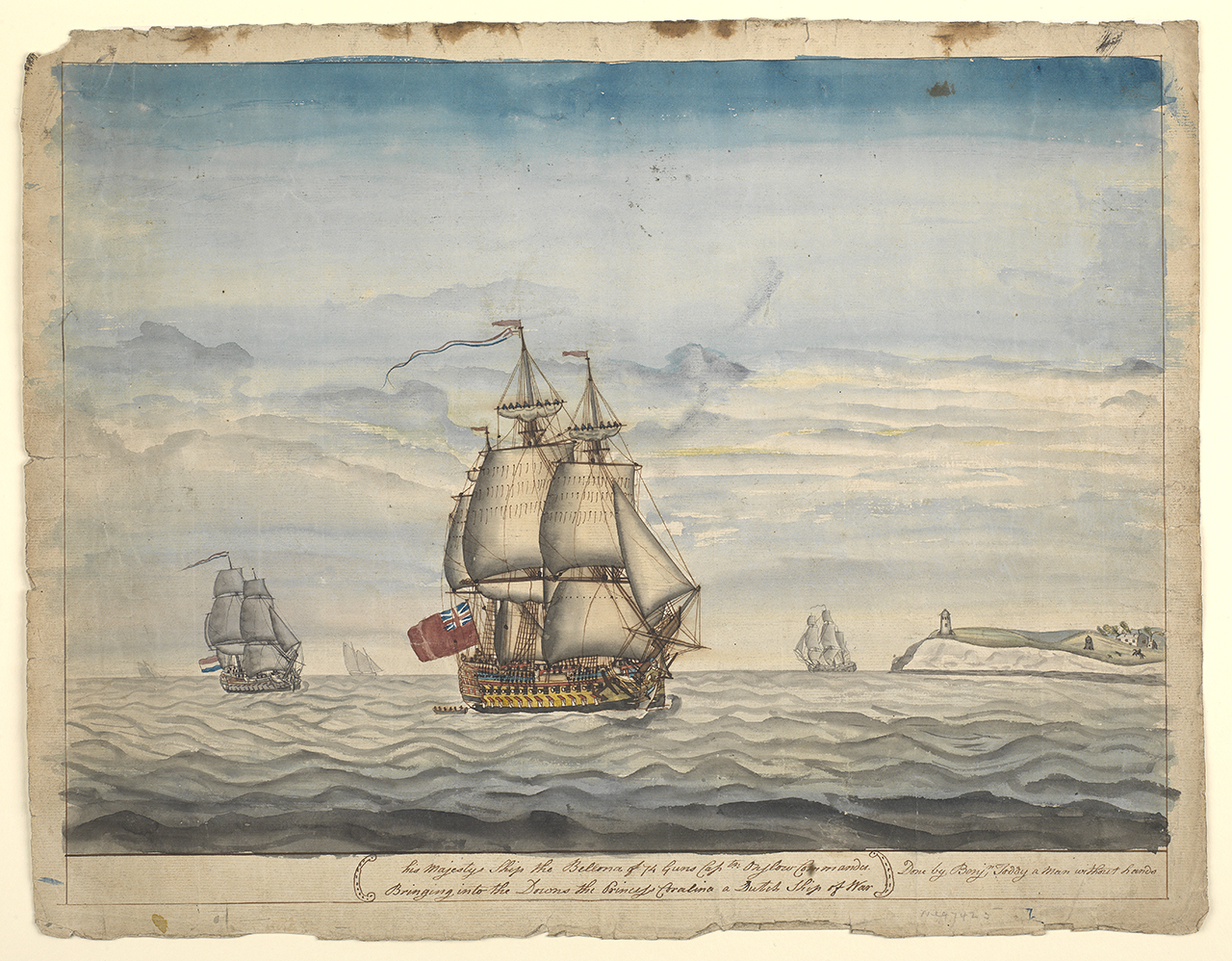
Princes Carolina (first from left) in 1781

Four ships of the Royal Navy have borne the name HMS Princess Caroline or HMS Princess Carolina:

- HMS Princess Caroline (1728) was an 80-gun second rate launched in 1697 as HMS Ranelagh. She was renamed HMS Princess Caroline in 1728, was rebuilt in 1731 and broken up in 1764.
- HMS Princess Caroline (1780) was a 44-gun fifth rate, previously the Dutch States Navy ship of the line Princes Carolina. She was captured on 30 December 1780 by HMS Marlborough, became a receiving ship in 1791 and was sunk as a breakwater in 1799.
- HMS Rotterdam was a 50-gun fourth rate, previously a Dutch ship. She was captured in 1781 by HMS Warwick and commissioned as HMS Rotterdam. She was renamed HMS Princess Caroline between 1799, reverting to HMS Rotterdam in 1806, before being sold that year.
- HMS Princess Carolina (1807) was a 74-gun third rate, also known as Princess Caroline. She was previously the Danish ship Prindsesse Carolina, but was captured at the Battle of Copenhagen in 1807. There were plans to rename her HMS Braganza, but this was never carried out and she was sold in 1815.

== See also ==
- HMS Princess
- HMS Caroline
