= HMS Amelia =

Four ships of the Royal Navy have borne the name HMS Amelia, whilst another was planned:

- HMS Amelia (1796) was a 38-gun fifth rate, previously the French frigate Proserpine, launched in 1785. She was captured in 1796 by HMS Dryad and was broken up in 1816.
- HMS Amelia (1856) was an Albacore-class wooden screw gunboat launched in 1856 and broken up in 1865.
- HMS Amelia was previously HMS Argus, a coastguard vessel launched in 1851, renamed HMS Amelia in 1872, HMS Fanny in 1889, used as a boom defence vessel from 1902, and sold in 1907.
- HMS Amelia was previously HMS Hawk a coastguard gunboat launched in 1869. She was renamed HMS Amelia in 1888, HMS Colleen in 1905, HMS Colleen Old in 1916, HMS Emerald in 1918 and HMS Cuckoo later in 1918 before being sold in 1922.
- HMS Amelia was to have been a Catherine-class minesweeper. She was launched in the United States in 1943, and was planned to be transferred to the Royal Navy, but was instead retained by the US Navy, where she served as USS Competent.

== See also ==
- HMS Princess Amelia
