= HMS Prince Frederick =

Several ships of the Royal Navy have borne the name HMS Prince Frederick:

- HMS Prince Frederick was a 70-gun third rate launched in 1679 as HMS Expedition. She was renamed HMS Prince Frederick in 1715. BU was completed at Portsmouth in June 1736.
- HMS Prince Frederick was a 70-gun third rate launched in 1740. She was sold in August 1784.
- HMS Prince Frederick was a 64-gun third rate, previously the Dutch ship Revolutie. She was captured in 1796, converted to a hospital ship by 1804, and was sold in 1817.
- HMS Prince Frederick was the Danish Royal Yacht Kronprindsens Lystfregat launched in 1785 and given by the King of England to his nephew, the Crown Prince of Denmark. After the Battle of Copenhagen (1807), the Danes sent her back to the British. The Royal Navy took her in as HMS Prince Frederick. She was renamed Princess Augusta in 1816, and sold in 1818.
