= Emily Courtier Dutton =

British actress and philanthropist

Kittie Claremont
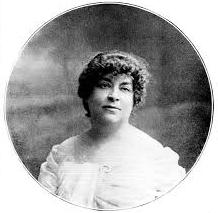
- "Mrs Kittie Carson"
- Born: Emily Courtier Dutton; 1862; London
- Died: 21 March 1919 (aged 56–57); Hove
- Other names: "Mrs Charles L. Carson"
- Known for: founding charities
- Spouse: Charles L. Carson

Emily Courtier-Dutton became Mrs Charles L. Carson and appeared as Kittie Claremont (1862 – 21 March 1919) was a British actor and theatrical philanthropist.

== Life ==
Courtier-Dutton was born in London in very probably 1862. He birth name is not known, but she became an actress appearing for the first time at the Garrick Theatre in Le voyage en Chine as Kittie Claremont. She enjoying good revues for other performances in the 1880s. She didn't act any further when she became the second wife of Lionel Courtier-Dutton and he already had three children. Her new husband was the founder of The Stage and he used the name "Charles L. Carson" when working. She decided that she would use the name "Charles L. Carson" professionally although she was sometimes referred to as "Kittie Carson".

In 1891 Carson had the idea of setting up The Theatrical Ladies Guild whose purpose was to look after actresses who became pregnant and lost their jobs. Fanny Brough became the guild's president. The group raised and distributed money and arranged for the creation of children's clothing by running sewing bees. The guild did not worry about whether the actresses were married or not. In 2010 the charity was still operating as the "Theatrical Guild" offering assistance to anyone in the theatre professions.

Later she also launched the "Theatrical Christmas Dinner Fund".

In 1896 she was concerned by the condition of the children of actors whose parents had died. The Actors' Orphanage Fund was created by her and Mrs Clement Scott. Sir Henry Irving was the first President. The first building was in Croydon. It was later established as the Actors' Orphanage Fund in 1912.

Courtier-Dutton died in 1919 in Hove.
