= HMS Prince William =

Two ships of the Royal Navy have borne the name HMS Prince William:

- HMS Prince William (1665) was a 4-gun flyboat captured in 1665 and captured again by the Dutch in 1666.
- HMS Prince William (1780) was a 64-gun third rate previously the Spanish ship Guispuscoano. She was captured in 1780, converted to a sheer hulk in 1791 and was broken up in 1816.

A third vessel served the Royal Navy as an HM hired armed ship Prince William.
