= HMS Princess Charlotte =

Three ships of the Royal Navy have been named HMS Princess Charlotte, after either Charlotte, Princess Royal, daughter of George III, or Princess Charlotte Augusta of Wales, daughter of George IV:

- HMS Princess Charlotte (1799) was a 32-gun fifth rate, previously the French frigate Junon. She was captured in 1799 and renamed Andromache in 1812. She was broken up in 1828.
- HMS Princess Charlotte (1814) was a 42-gun fifth rate, originally to have been named HMS Vittoria. She was launched in 1814, was renamed HMS Burlington in 1814 and was sold for breaking up in 1833.
- HMS Princess Charlotte (1825) was a 104-gun first rate launched in 1825. She was used as a receiving ship from 1858 and was sold in 1875.

== See also ==
- There appear to have been two hired armed schooners named Princess Charlotte, one of which served from 1804 to 1805, and the second of which was listed as being in service between 1805 and 1806, and possibly 1807, and more certainly in 1808 Jan-June, per ADM 41/78, Ships' Musters.
- The West Africa Squadron employed the services of the colonial armed schooner Princess Charlotte that between 1813 and 1816 captured some 20 slave trading vessels.
- Princess Charlotte (1796 EIC ship) was launched 1796 and an East Indiaman serving the British East India Company that the French captured in 1804.
