= Henry Dawes (Royal Navy officer) =

Royal Navy officer

Captain Henry Dawes
- Died: 17 May 1667 off Norwegian coast
- Military career
- Allegiance: Kingdom of England
- Service: Royal Navy
- Service years: 1665–1667
- Rank: Captain
- Commands: John and Thomas; Princess
- Wars: Second Anglo-Dutch War; Action of 17 May 1667 †

Captain Henry Dawes (d. 1667) was an officer in the English Royal Navy.

In 1665, he was appointed captain of the John and Thomas of forty-eight guns, and in the following year was promoted to command the Princess.

After taking several rich prizes, in April 1667 he sailed for Gottenburgh, and on 20 April fell in with a Dutch squadron of ships of war off the Dogger. (Note: The following account was given of this encounter in a letter written oy Captain Dawes himself: "On the second day after our departure from Berwick, which was on the 20th past, we discovered twenty-five sail of ships, which, upon our nearer approach, about the middle of the Dogger Bank, proved to be seventeen sail of Rotterdam men of War, with two fireships and six smacks. steering N.N.W. the wind at S.E. About six in the morning their rear admiral of sixty-four guns, attended by five frigates of forty-eight and fifty guns a-piece, came up with us, the rear-admiral several times attempting to lay us a-board, with great cries for the States of Holland, but received so warm a welcome that forced him to edge off, and keep on the weather quarter. About two in the afternoon, the admiral of seventy guns, being a good sailer, got close under our lee-bow, and two of his seconds on our weather-bow, attempting to cross our hause, our main-top-mast and mizen yard being shot in pieces, we bore up round and fought our way through them, still keeping them from coming a-board us. The vice-admiral, mounting sixty-six guns, being sternmost the squadron, intending then to cross our hause, having his decks full of men ready to enter; but our ship wearing round, we brought our broadside to his bow, and being all laden below with double and bar shot, and above with case and baggs, our shot did such good execution on them, that we brought his foreyard to the deck and laid him by the lee: by five in the afternoon we got clear of all the fleet, and stood to the eastward, they chacing us till night, and then steered on their course. The damage done to our hull was but small, having not received above thirty-eight shot; but our rigging and sails much torn: only four men killed and nine hurt.") Surrounded by such a host of foes, destruction appeared inevitable, yet he managed to fight his way through them all and escape. He reached Gottenburgh in safety; and having refitted his ship was on his return home, when he was attacked, on the coast of Norway, by two Danish men of war. He fell in the action. (Note: The following is the account given of the action by the officers who survived: Princess, May 23, 1667. On the 17th instant, about one o'clock in the afternoon, we engaged two Danish men of war of forty guns each, within sight of the coast of Norway, where, after an hour's fight, captain Dawes, commander of the frigate, lost his left thigh by a great shot, of which he died before he could be handed down to the plat-form; at his expiring saying, "for God's sake do not yield the ship to those fellows." The lieutenant succeeding in the command, was, about half an hour after, wounded in both leggs, and carried down to the plat-form. The master next taking up the sword, received a mortal wound by a great shot, [which] entering his back and coming out at his right shoulder, took away with it his arm. After him, by general consent, the gunner commanded the ship; who, perceiving the Danes to edge from us, ordered the helm to be put hard a-weather, until he came up to them within pistol shot, where, for three hours space, we lay battering each other till the Danes growing weary of the fight, stood away to their own shore. The next morning we were in readiness to receive the Danes, who were to windward of us, and had as well the advantage of the wind, as the current to assault us, but would not attempt it, though we fired a gun by way of defiance; so that seeing the Danes had weighed, and made use of the wind to get into the sound—not having above four day's provision left we bore up for England and this day came to an anchor at the buoy of the Nore.") Thus Dawes, who had proved himself against the avowed and declared enemies of his country, perished in a contest with the ships of a nation with whom England was not at war.

== Notes ==
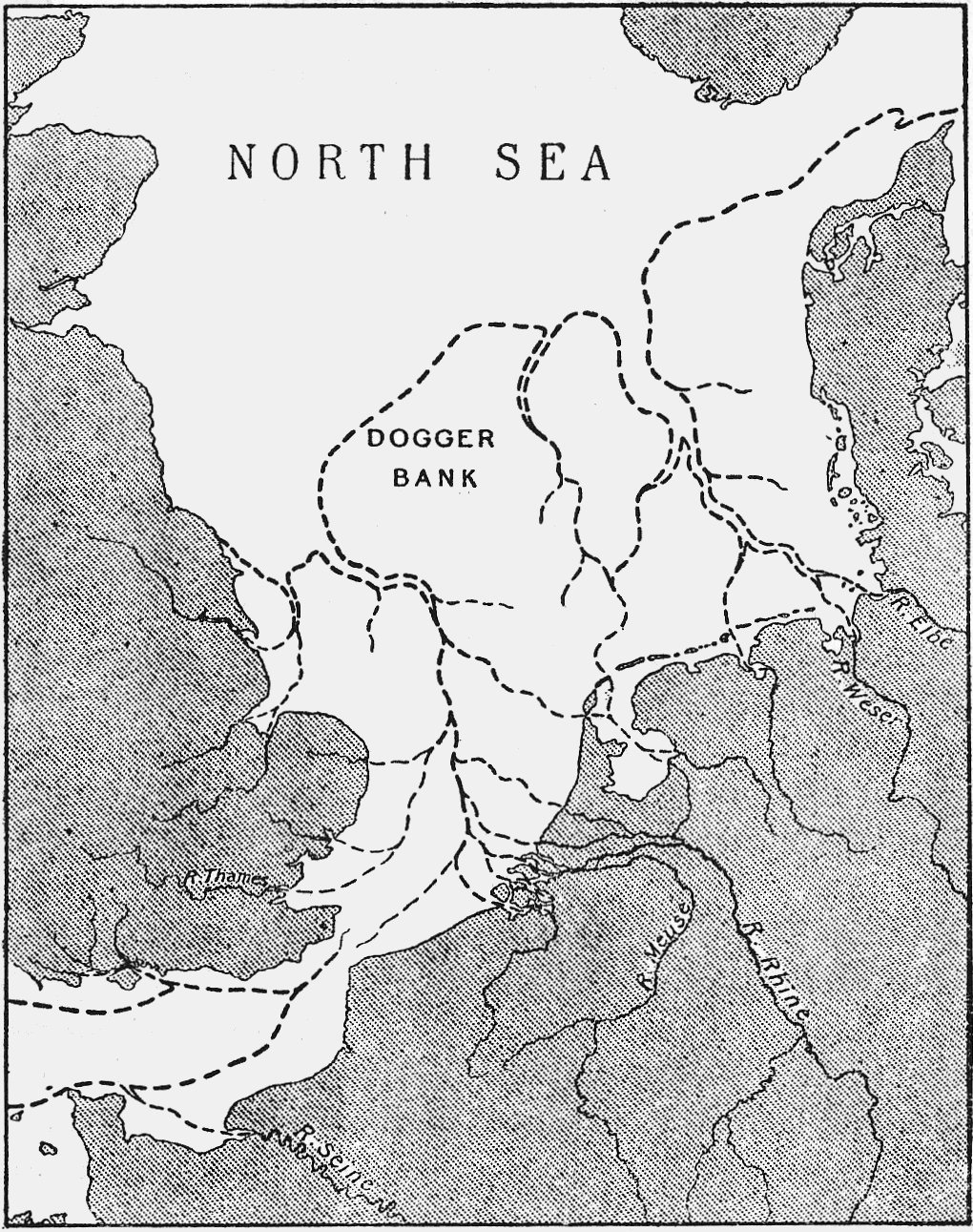
Map of the Dogger Bank

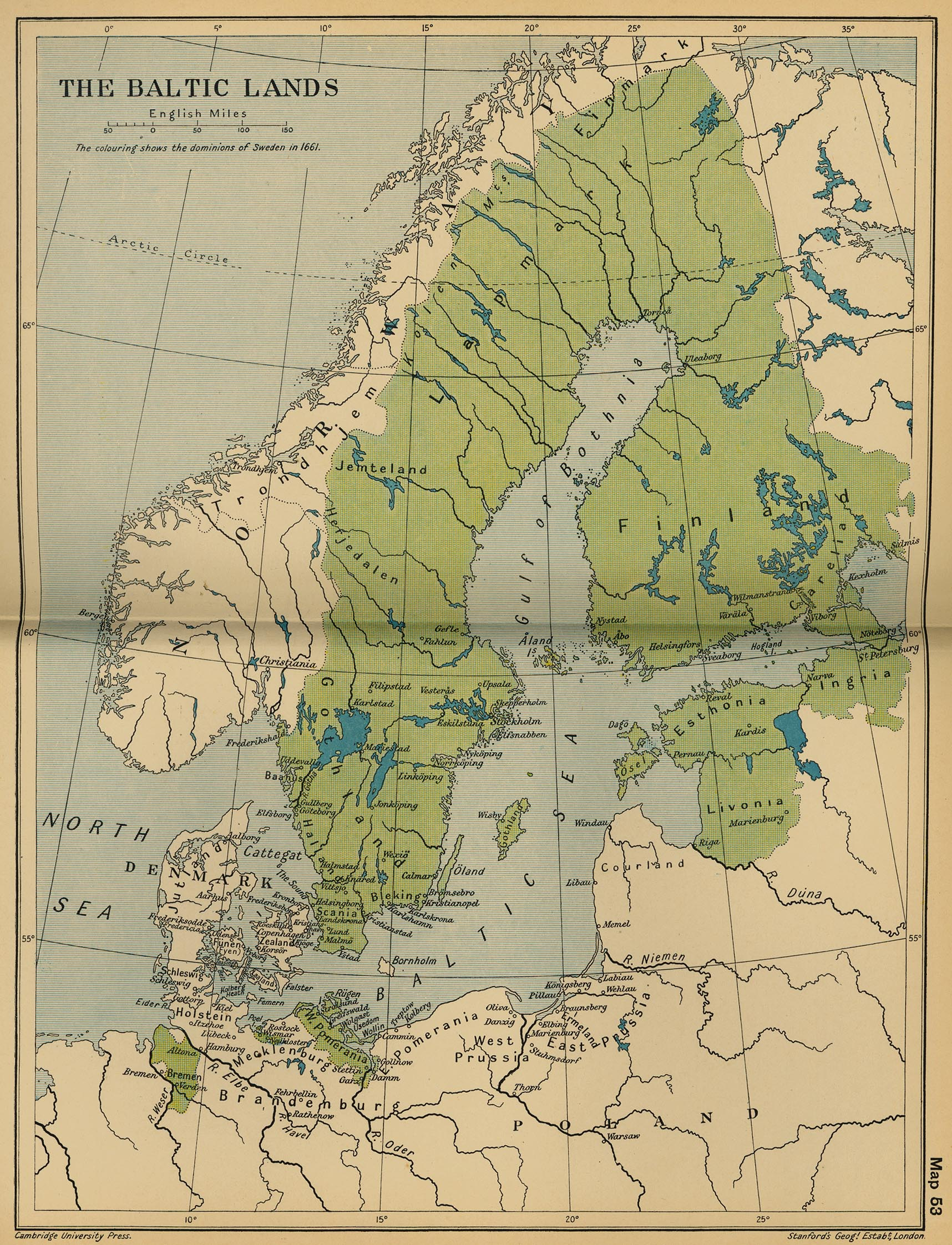
The Baltic Lands in 1661

== Bibliography ==
- Allen, Joseph (1852). Battles of the British Navy. Vol. 2. London: Henry G. Bohn. p. 65.
- Charnock, John (1794). "Dawes, Henry". Biographia Navalis. Vol. 1. London: R. Faulder. pp. 161–162.
- Clowes, William Laird (1898). The Royal Navy: A History From the Earliest Times to the Present. Vol. 2. London: Sampson Low, Marston and Company. pp. 435–436.
