= HMS Expedition (1679) =

Ship of the line of the Royal Navy

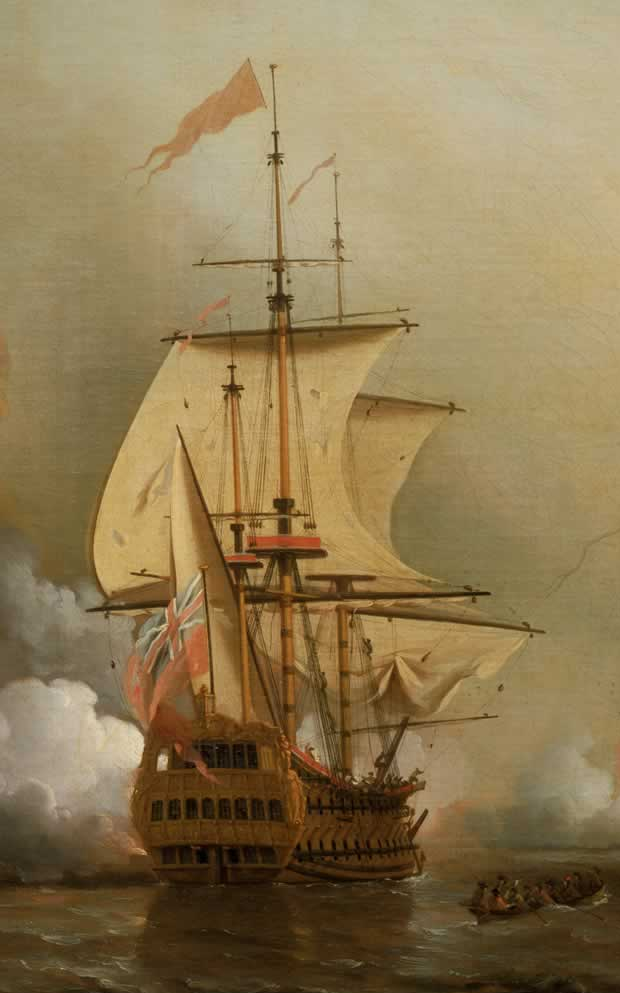
- HMS Expedition

History

Kingdom of England
- Name: HMS Expedition
- Ordered: April 1677
- Builder: Portsmouth Dockyard
- Launched: 10 September 1679
- Commissioned: 1689
- Renamed: HMS Prince Frederick, 2 January 1715
- Honours and awards: Barfleur 1692; Marbella 1705

History

Great Britain
- Name: HMS Prince Frederick
- Commissioned: 1718
- Renamed: HMS Prince Frederick, 2 January 1715
- Stricken: June/July 1764
- Honours and awards: Finisterre 1747; Louisburg 1758; Quebec 1759
- Fate: Sold 1784

General characteristics as built
- Class & type: 70-gun third-rate ship of the line
- Tons burthen: 1,05974/94 tons (bm)
- Length: 152 ft 2 in (46.38 m) gundeck; 121 ft 0 in (36.88 m) keel for tonnage
- Beam: 40 ft 9 in (12.42 m)
- Draught: 18 ft 0 in (5.49 m)
- Depth of hold: 17 ft (5.18 m)
- Sail plan: Full-rigged ship
- Armament: 1685 Establishment 72/60 guns; 26 × demi-cannons 54 cwt – 9.5 ft (LD); 26 × demi-culverins (UD); 10 × sakers 16 cwt – 7 ft (QD); 4 × sakers 16 cwt – 7 ft (Fc); 5 × 5 3-pdr guns 5 cwt – 5 ft (RH)

General characteristics 1699 rebuild
- Class & type: 70-gun third-rate ship of the line
- Tons burthen: 1,1161/94 tons (bm)
- Length: 152 ft 1 in (46.36 m) gundeck; 125 ft 10 in (38.35 m) keel for tonnage
- Beam: 40 ft 10 in (12.45 m)
- Depth of hold: 17 ft 1.5 in (5.22 m)
- Sail plan: Full-rigged ship
- Armament: 1685 Establishment 72/60 guns; 26 × demi-cannons (54 cwt – 9.5 ft (LD); 26 × demi-culverins (UD); 10 × sakers 16 cwt – 7 ft (QD); 4 × sakers 16 cwt – 7 ft (Fc); 5 × 5 3-pdr guns 5 cwt – 5 ft (RH)

General characteristics 1714 rebuild
- Class & type: 1706 Establishment 70-gun third-rate ship of the line
- Tons burthen: 1,11092/94 tons (bm)
- Length: 150 ft (45.72 m) gundeck; 124 ft (37.795 m) gundeck
- Beam: 41 ft (12.50 m)
- Depth of hold: 17 ft 4 in (5.28 m)
- Sail plan: Full-rigged ship
- Armament: 1719 Establishment 70 guns; 26 × 24-pdr guns (LD); 26 × 12-pdr guns (UD); 14 × 6-pdr guns (QD); 4 × 6-pdr guns (Fc)

General characteristics 1740 rebuild
- Class & type: 1733 proposals 70-gun third-rate ship of the line
- Tons burthen: 1,22564/94 tons (bm)
- Length: 151 ft (46.02 m) gundeck; 122 ft 2 in (37.24 m) keel for tonnage
- Beam: 43 ft 5 in (13.23 m)
- Depth of hold: 17 ft 9 in (5.41 m)
- Sail plan: Full-rigged ship
- Armament: 70 guns: 26 × 24-pdr guns (LD); 26 × 12-pdr guns (UD); 14 × 6-pdr guns (QD); 4 × 6-pdr guns (Fc)

HMS Expedition was a 70-gun third-rate ship of the line of the Royal Navy built at Portsmouth Dockyard in 1677/79. She was in active commission during the Nine Years' War participating in the battles of Beachy Head and Barfleur. She was rebuilt in 1699. Again, for the War of Spanish Succession she was in commission for the operation at Cadiz then returned to England where she sat for two years. She was in the Mediterranean for the Battle of Marbella in 1705. She then went to the West Indies and fought in Wager's action off Cartagena in 1708. She was rebuilt in 1709–14 to the 1706 Establishment. She spent her time split between the Baltic and as guard ship at Portsmouth before being broken at Portsmouth in 1736. She was rebuilt in 1736/40 at Deptford Dockyard.

She was the third vessel to bear the name Expedition since it was used for a 20-gun French ship, captured in 1618 and listed until 1652. She was the first vessel to bear the name Prince Frederick in the English and Royal Navy. Expedition was awarded the battle honours "Barfleur 1692", and "Marbella 1705". As HMS Prince Frederick, she was awarded the battle honours "Finisterre 1747", "Louisburg 1758", and "Quebec 1759".

== Construction and specifications ==
She was ordered in April 1677 to be built at Portsmouth Dockyard under the guidance of Master Shipwright Daniel Furzer. She was launched on 10 September 1679. Her dimensions were a gundeck of 152 feet 1 inch (46.36 metres) with a keel of 121 feet 0 inches (36.88 metres) for tonnage calculation with a breadth of 40 feet 9 inches (12.42 metres) and a depth of hold of 17 feet 0 inches (5.18 metres). Her builder's measure tonnage was calculated as 1,06872/94 tons (burthen). Her draught was 18 feet 0 inches (5.49 metres).

Her initial gun armament was in accordance with the 1677 Establishment with 70/62 guns consisting of twenty-six demi-cannons (54 cwt, (Note: "cwt", or "hundredweight" refers to the weight of the gun itself.) 9.5 ft) on the lower deck, twenty-six 12-pounder guns (32 cwt, 9 ft) on the upper deck, ten sakers (16 cwt, 7 ft) on the quarterdeck and four sakers (16 cwt, 7 ft) on the foc's'le with four 3-pounder guns (5 cwt, 5 ft) on the poop deck or roundhouse. By 1688 she would carry 70 guns as per the 1685 Establishment. Her initial manning establishment would be for a crew of 460/380/300 personnel.

== Commissioned service ==
=== Service 1679-1699 ===
She was commissioned in 1689 under the command of Captain John Clements. She partook in the Battle of Beachy Head in Centre (Red) Squadron on 30 June 1690 . In 1691 she was under command of Captain Edward Dover until his death on 16 November 1695. She fought in the Battle of Barfleur in Blue Squadron, Van Division from 19 to 22 May 1692 . Captain John Shovell was in command in November 1695 until he died on 11 April 1697. Captain James Stewart took over in April 1697. She was in action on 23 August 1697. In 1699 Captain Lord Archibald Hamilton was her commander. She was paid off in May 1699. She would be rebuilt at Chatham in 1699.

=== Rebuild Chatham Dockyard 1699 ===
She was ordered rebuilt after the end of the War of the English Succession at Chatham Dockyard under the guidance of Master Shipwright Daniel Furzer Jr. She was launched/completed in 1699. Her dimensions were a gundeck of 152 feet 1 inch (46.36 metres) with a keel of 125 feet 10 inches (38.35 metres) for tonnage calculation with a breadth of 40 feet 10 inches (12.45 metres) and a depth of hold of 17 feet 1.5 inches (5.22 metres). Her builder's measure tonnage was calculated as 1,1161/94 tons (burthen). She probably retained her armament as stated in the 1685 Establishment, though it is unclear if her armament was changed to the 1703 Establishment later. It is known that when completed her gun armament total at least 70 guns.

=== Service 1702-1709 ===
With the outbreak of the War of Spanish Succession (1702–1712), she was commissioned under Captain John Knapp for service in Rear-Admiral Sir Stafford Fairborne's Squadron for the expedition to Cadiz, Spain. Admiral Fairborne's Squadron was detached to reconnoiter Corunna for French ships on 22 July. Finding nothing they rejoined Sir George Rooke's Fleet at sea on 8 August. The Fleet arrived at the Bay of Bulls (north of Cadiz) on the 12th. After may meeting and indecision the Fleet departed on 18 September. On 21 September it was learned that a French Fleet and Spanish treasure ships were in the vicinity of Vigo Bay. On the 11th a council of war was held to determine the ships that would initially enter the bay. HMS Expedition was not chosen and remained off the entrance of the Bay of Vigo. She returned to England. In July 1704 she was lying at Portsmouth with no captain assigned.

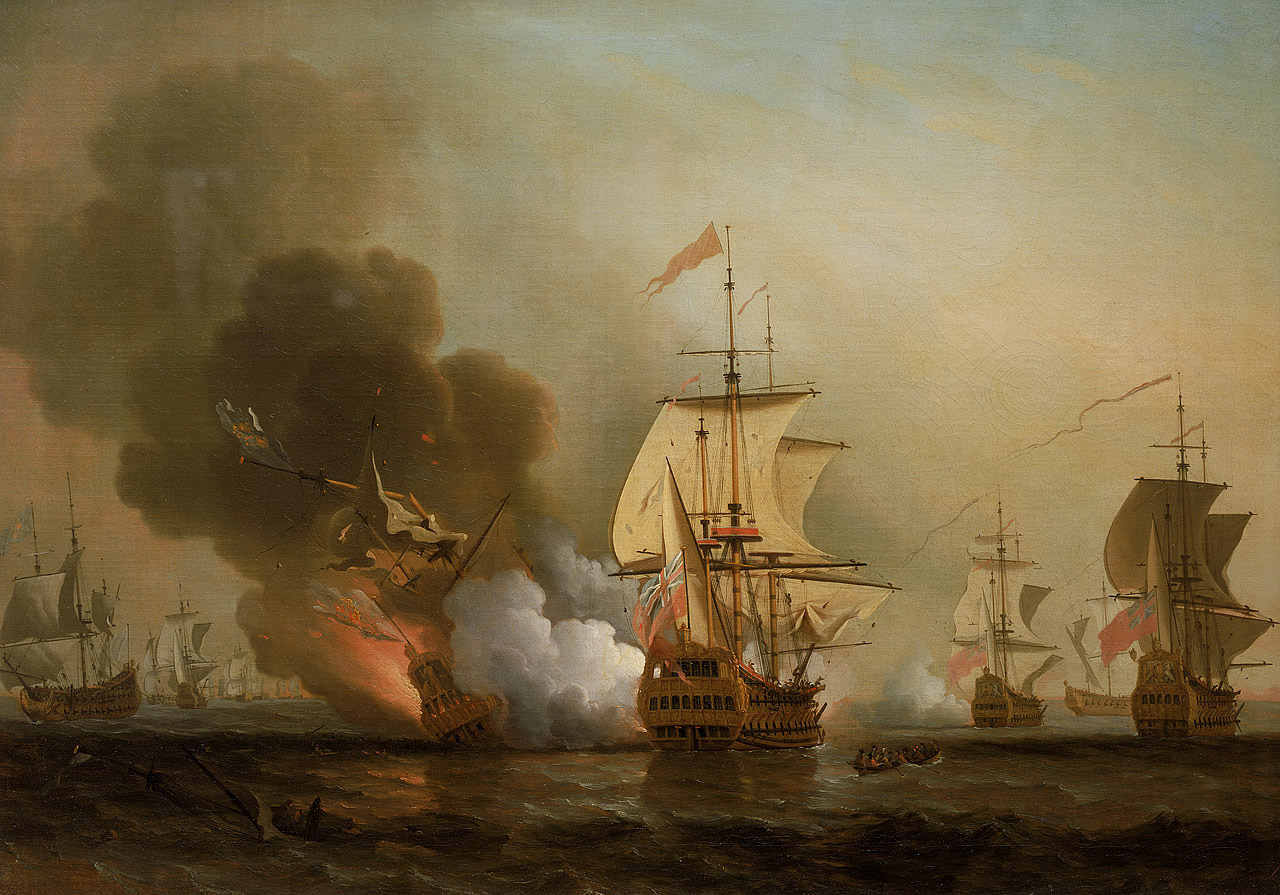
Wager's Action off Cartagena, 28 May 1708

In 1705 she was commissioned under Captain Thomas Coale sailing in Rear-Admiral Thomas Dilke's squadron. She fought at the Battle of Marbella on 10 March 1705. During the action two French ships the Magnanime (74) and the Lys (86) were driven ashore and burnt, three French ships were taken, the 60-gun Arrogant, the 66-gun Ardent and the 66-gun Marquis. In 1706 she sailed to Brazil.

She was under Captain Edward Windsor in 1707 as Commodore Charles Wager's Flagship for operations in the West Indies. The small squadron sailed from Plymouth on 10 April 1707. In 1708 she came under Captain Henry Long remaining as Wager's Flagship. With the intent of attacking the Spanish Treasure prior to it arriving at Havana, Cuba, Commodore Wager sailed in January 1708 to intercept these vessels. After two months it was discovered that the ships would not sail before 1 May. He returned to Port Royal, then sailed again on 14 April. The vessels were sighted on 28 May making for Cartagena, Venezuela. She fought in Wager's Action at Cartagena on 28 May 1708. Two Spanish 64-gun vessels were destroyed, and a 44-gun vessel was taken. After the action the captains of Portland and Kingston were court martialed and dismissed from their ships and never served againClowes (1898), Chapter XXIII, pages 373–376.

She arrived at Portsmouth on 11 March 1709 to be dismantle for rebuilding.

=== Rebuild Portsmouth 1709-1714 ===
She was ordered rebuilt under the 1706 Establishment at Portsmouth under the guidance of Master Shipwright Richard Stacey. Her keel was laid on 11 March 1709 and launched on 16 August 1714. She was renamed Prince Frederick in honour of King George I's son Prince Frederick, the Prince of Wales on 2 January 1715. Her dimensions were a gundeck of 150 feet 6 inches (45.87 metres) with a keel of 124 feet 3 inches (37.87 metres) for tonnage calculation with a breadth of 41 feet 0 inches (12.50 metres) and a depth of hold of 17 feet 4 inches (5.28 metres). Her builder's measure tonnage was calculated as 1,11092/94 tons (burthen).

Her armament was under the 1703 Establishment as 70 guns wartime/62 guns peacetime consisting of twenty-four/twenty-two 24-pounder guns of 9.5 feet in length on the lower deck, twenty-six/twenty-four demi-culverins of 9-foot length on the upper deck, twelve/ten 6-pounder guns of 8.5-foot length on the quarterdeck, and four/two 6-pounder guns of (2/2) 9-foot length and (2/0) of 7.5-foot length, with four 5.5 foot 3-pounder guns on the poop deck or roundhouse. She may have carried her demi-cannons on the lower deck for a few years more.

She was completed at a cost of £11,834.14.1.75d. (Note: A total cost accounting for inflation of approximately £1,998,300 in today's money)

=== Service 1718-1736 ===
She was commissioned as HMS Prince Frederick in 1718 under the command of Captain Covill Mayne for service with Sir John Norris's Fleet in the Baltic sailing on 28 April returning to England in October. Later in 1718 she was under Captain Robert Haward as Flagship of Rear-Admiral James Mighells in Home Waters. She was fitted for operations in the Baltic for the Spring of 1719, 1720 and 1721. In May 1719 Captain Edward St Lo was in command as the Flagship of Rear-Admiral Francis Hosier for service in the Baltic. On 16 April 1720 she again sailed for the Baltic with Sir John Norris, returning in November. She again returned to the Baltic in 1721 to cruise off Reveal. After peace was declared in 1721, Sir John Norris returned with his Fleet, anchoring at the Nore on 20 October. In 1723 she was fitted as a guard ship under the command of Captain Edward Falkingham on guardship duties at Portsmouth. She was again fitted for service in the Baltic in the Spring of 1726. In the Spring of 1727, she was fitted for service in the Mediterranean. She was off the coast of Spain in 1727. Her breaking was completed at Portsmouth in June 1736.

=== Rebuild Deptford Dockyard 1736-1740 ===
She was ordered rebuilt in 1736 at Deptford Dockyard under the guidance of Master Shipwright Richard Stacey. Her remains were moved from Portsmouth to Deptford and her keel was laid in December 1736. She was launched on 18 March 1740. Her dimensions were a gundeck of 151 feet 0 inches (46.02 metres) with a keel of 122 feet 2 inches (37.24 metres) for tonnage calculation with a breadth of 43 feet 5 inches (13.23 metres) and a depth of hold of 17 feet 9 inches (5.41 metres). Her builder's measure tonnage was calculated as 1,22464/94 tons (burthen).

Her armament was under the 1733 Establishment as 70 guns consisting of twenty-six 24-pounder guns on the lower deck (LD), twenty-six 12-pounder guns on the upper deck (UD), fourteen 6-pounder guns on the quarterdeck (QD), and four 6-pounder guns on the foc's'le (Fc). After her great repair in 1742/43, her 6-pounder guns were reduced by six guns (four from the QD and two from the Fc) and she was rerated as a 64-gun third rate ship.

She was completed for sea on 11 June 1740 at an initial cost to include fitting of £23,378.16.5d. (Note: A total cost accounting for inflation of approximately £3,946,000 in today's money)

=== Service 1740-1784 ===
With the outbreak of the War of Austrian Succession (1740–48), she was commissioned in the Spring or early Summer 1740 under the command of Captain George Clinton for service with Sir John Norris's Fleet. However, in the late summer/early fall of 1740, she was placed under Captain Lord Audrey Beauclerk for service in the West Indies. She sailed on 26 October 1740 for the West Indies as part of Rear-Admiral Sir Chaloner Ogle's Fleet escorting 9,000 troops for an operation at Cartagena, Venezuela. On 27 December, while sailing towards St Kitt's, four large ships were sighted and Admiral Ogle order six ships of the line to give chase. By 4 pm the strangers hoisted French colours and by 10 pm The Prince Frederick caught the French ships. The vessels were hailed then a gun was fired and answered with a broadside from the French vessels. Prince Frederick and Orford fought for 90 minutes when Weymouth arrived. The captain of the Weymouth expressed his conviction they were French, so Captain Beauclerk signalled the Orford to desist, though the French continued to fire their guns. The British re-engaged for a further 30 minutes. During the action Prince Frederick had lost four killed with nine wounded. The British ships then rejoined Admiral Ogle and arrived at Jamaica on 9 January and fell under the command of Vice-Admiral Edward Vernon.

She took part in the operations around Cartagena during March/April 1741. She was involved in the general attack carried out on 23 March which included a naval bombardment of the Spanish Fortifications. Captain Beauclerk was killed on 24 March 1741. The naval bombardment was ceased on the 24th. Captain the Honourable Edward Boscawen took command following the death of Captain Beauclerk. With mush dissent between the Army commander, General Wentworth and Vice-Admiral Vernon, the operation was abandoned by 16 April 1741.

In 1742 she was under command of Captain Curtis Barnet for service in the Bay of Biscay during July 1742. She underwent a fitting at Portsmouth for 6,161.6.11d (Note: A total cost accounting for inflation of approximately £1,170,700 in today's money) between October 1742 and April 1743. When completed she flew the Broad Pennant in the Bay of Biscay in October 1743. Captain Harry Norris took command in 1744 for service with Sir John Norris's Fleet in the English Channel and Bay of Biscay during 1745/46. She took four privateers during this time: Madonna la Portiere – 9 July 1745; Le Jupiter – 20 July 1745; La Fortune – 18 February 1746; and L’Intrepide – 5 January 1746. She partook in the Battle of Finisterre on 3 May 1747. Twelve of the fourteen French men-of-war were taken. All vessels were incorporated into the Royal Navy.

She was under the temporary command of Captain William Holburne sailing with Vice-Admiral Sir Peter Warren's Fleet in April 1748. She underwent a survey on 29 January 1749 then placed in Ordinary at Chatham. On 23 April 1751 she underwent another survey. Under Admiralty Order 2 May 1751 she underwent a great repair at Chatham costing 16,284.12.11d (Note: A total cost accounting for inflation of approximately £3,184,100 in today's money) between January 1751 and February 1752. She was recommissioned in April 1755 under the command of Captain Jervis Porter for service with Rear-Admiral Sir Edward Hawke's Fleet. In April 1756 she was sent to Admiral Hawke's Fleet as a reinforcement after the outbreak of the Seven Years War (1756–1763). In 1757 under Captain William Harman, she sailed for the Leeward Islands. In 1758 she was under Captain Robert Man and sailed for North America on 29 January 1758. In August 1758 Captain Robert Routh took command for the capture of Fortress Louisburg in Cape Breton. She was at the capture of Quebec on the Saint Lawrence in New France (Canada). In 1760 she was with the Western Squadron. Captain Routh died on 3 October 1760.She was surveyed on 3 February 1760 with no repair required. In October 1760, Captain Jervis Maplesden took command remaining with the Western Squadron. She was off Brest in 1761 and the blockade of the Basque Roads in 1762, then returned to Robert Man's squadron off Brest. With the end of the Seven Years War, she was paid off in March 1763. She was surveyed on 25 April 1763 with no repairs required.

== Disposition ==
She was fitted as a temporary Lazerette (Note: Lazaerette - a hulk adapted to be used as a floating hospital or isolation ward, often used as accommodation for men in quarantine) at Chatham for £1,730.18.10d (Note: A total cost accounting for inflation of approximately £272,800 in today's money) between June and July 1764., then transported to Stangate Creek. She was sold under Admiralty Order (AO) 27 August 1784.
