= HMS Prince Edward =

Five vessels of the Royal Navy have borne the name HMS Prince Edward:

- HMS Prince Edward (1745) was a 44-gun fifth rate launched in 1745 and sold in 1766.
- HMS Prince Edward (1780) was a 14-gun brig-sloop purchased in 1780. Seized by mutineers & American prisoners in September 1782.
- HMS Prince Edward (1781) was a 62-gun third rate, previously the Dutch ship Mars. She was captured in 1781, placed on harbour service and was sold in 1802.
- Prince Edward was a 10-gun cutter on the North America station in 1795, under the command of Lieutenant J.G. Saville. She was present at the capture of Prévoyante.
- HMS Prince Edward (1915) was a paddle steamer, operating as a boom defence and anti-submarine vessel, requisitioned by the Admiralty from the Isle of Man Steam Packet Company where she had previously operated as PS Prince of Wales. Launched 14 April 1887 Gross Tonnage 1,547.2 Length (OA) 341.6 ft' Pass, Acc Ist Class 1088. 3rd Class 458 Trial speed 24:25 knots. Bought by the Steam Packet Co on 23–11–1888, she was faster than her sister ship PS Queen Victoria sailing in 1897 from the Rock Light, New Brighton to Douglas Head in 2 hours 59 minutes. an average speed of 23.5 knots. Her war duties took her as far away as the Eastern Mediterranean and she saw action in the Gallipoli Campaign at one time accompanying another Steam Packet Co ship SNAEFELL. Eventually broken up 1920.
