= HMS Princess Alice =

British iron paddle packet ship

HMS Princess Alice was an iron paddle packet ship purchased by the Admiralty in 1844. The vessel was named for Queen Victoria's third child, Princess Alice Maud Mary (born 25 April 1843).

== Career ==
HMS Princess Alice had a short and uneventful naval career. Based at Dover, the vessel's role was to provide a cross-Channel mail and passenger service.

From 1864 to 1878, Princess Alice acted as tender to HMS Royal Adelaide (1828), the flagship at Devonport (Plymouth) and was used as a yacht for the Commander-in-Chief.

The ship was taken apart at Devonport Dockyard in 1878.

== Figurehead ==
The figurehead was described by The Society for Nautical Research as a 'bust of a young woman inclining forward, very pretty face. Brown bodice with red rose at breast opening'. It is clear from this description that the figurehead has undergone several paint transformations since it was attached to the ship.

It formed part of the Devonport Dockyard collection, recorded at the Fire Engine House, Devonport, Plymouth, in the 1911 Admiralty Catalogue amongst 68 other figureheads.

In 1957, it was placed at the entrance to the Wardroom on HMS Phoenicia (Fort Manoel), Malta. It was later accessioned into the then Royal Naval Museum's collection following the withdrawal from Malta in the early 1970s.

HMS Princess Alice was shipped home to the UK and added to the Portsmouth collection alongside HMS Caradoc, HMS Cruizer and HMS Hibernia in 1974.

The figurehead, at just over a metre high, is one of the smallest figureheads in the collection at the National Museum of the Royal Navy, Portsmouth, where she can be seen today. It can also be viewed alongside other figureheads within the collection on the Bloomberg Connects website.
