= Fife House =

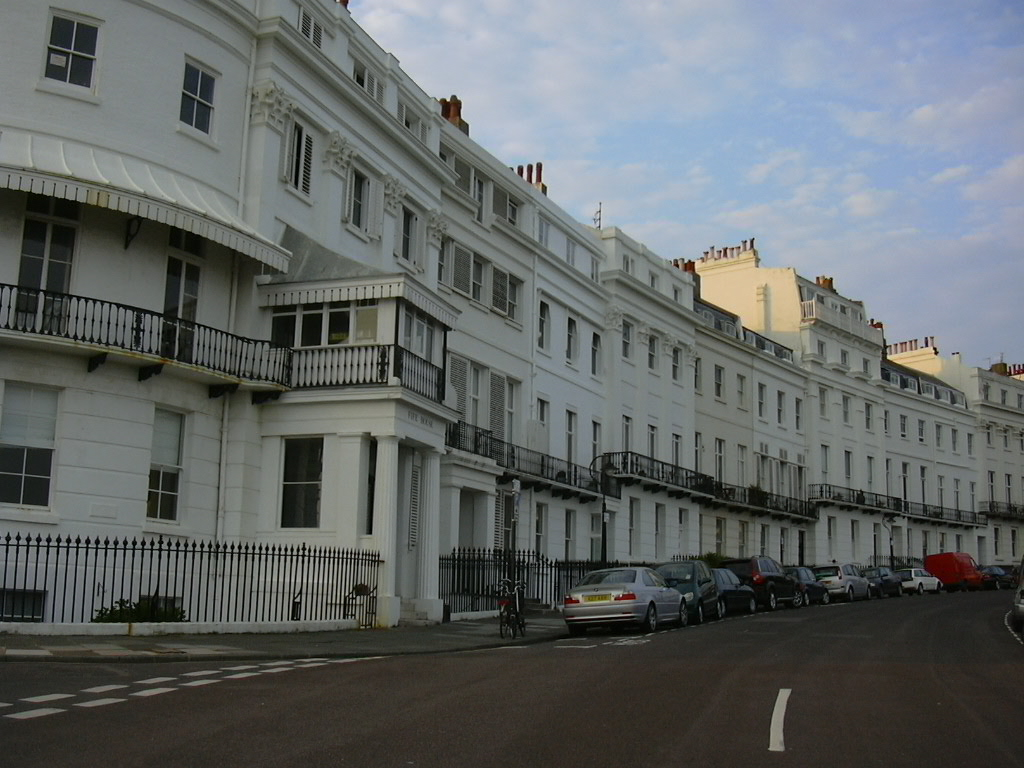
- Fife House (in foreground) at west end of Lewes Crescent
- Interactive map of the Fife House area

General information
- Type: Terraced house
- Architectural style: Regency
- Location: Kemp Town, Brighton, England
- Coordinates: 50.8159°N 0.1129°W
- Construction started: 1828

Technical details
- Floor count: 5

Design and construction
- Architects: Charles Busby, Amon Wilds
- Main contractor: Thomas Cubitt
- Awards: Grade I listed

Fife House, No 1, Lewes Crescent, is a Grade I listed building in Kemp Town, Brighton, United Kingdom, which was previously owned by the Duke of Devonshire and the Duke of Fife.

== History ==
Fife House was originally built in 1828 by Thomas Cubitt, as part of the Kemp Town estate planned by Thomas Read Kemp, and designed by Charles Busby and Amon Wilds. It was bought in 1829 by the William Cavendish, 6th Duke of Devonshire. He had the property, situated at 1, Lewes Crescent, joined internally by Thomas Cubitt, using workmen from Chatsworth, to an adjacent property he also owned at 14, Chichester Terrace. The Duke had the property redecorated by John Gregory Crace in 1848, and lived there until his death in 1858.

The Duke of Fife lived in the property from 1896, with his wife, Princess Louise, the daughter of King Edward VII. The house was named Fife House at that time. King Edward visited the house on a number of occasions, most notably staying there during his convalescence in 1908. It was for this reason that the King's toilet was installed in the house. Princess Louise lived in the property until 1924.

From 1947 and for most of the rest of the 20th century, Fife House was the home of the Weston family, who founded and ran the nearby Nevill House Hotel.

== Recent history ==
During renovation work carried out under the supervision of new owners Todd Cooper and Giuseppe Sironi in 2001 the decoration by Crace was rediscovered under several layers of wallpaper.

Telecommunications millionnaire Patrick Naughton bought the property in 2002 for £2.85 million. The bathrooms in Fife House were renovated in 2002 by Emily Swift-Jones and Joseph Atkinson of Aurum Design.

The property was featured in 2005 in House Detectives, a BBC series which investigated the histories of domestic properties. It was revealed that Baker, the Bachelor Duke of Devonshire's butler, occupied a small house at the rear of the property for twenty five years.

The property was sold in 2008, to an unknown buyer, for £1.75 million. It was reported that the property had been occupied by squatters during December 2008, but they had moved out by mid-January 2009.
