= HMS Prince Albert =

Two ships of the Royal Navy have been named HMS Prince Albert, after Prince Albert, husband of Queen Victoria:

- HMS Prince Albert was to have been a 91-gun screw-propelled second rate. She was renamed HMS Princess Royal before her launch in 1853 and was sold in 1872.
- HMS Prince Albert (1864) was an iron screw turret ship launched in 1864 and sold in 1899.

See also:

- HMS Prins Albert (1940) was a hired Belgian cross-Channel ferry, built in 1937, which served as a landing ship between 1941 and 1946.
