= English ship Princess (1660) =

Ship of the line of the Royal Navy

History

England
- Name: HMS Princess
- Ordered: 9 September 1658
- Builder: Daniel Furzer, Lydney
- Launched: 27 August 1660
- Fate: Broken up, 1680

General characteristics
- Class & type: Fourth-rate frigate
- Tons burthen: 602 40/94 (bm)
- Length: 105 ft (32.0 m) (keel)
- Beam: 31 ft 6 in (9.6 m)
- Depth of hold: 14 ft 6 in (4.4 m)
- Sail plan: Full-rigged ship
- Armament: 44 guns (1660); 54 guns (1677)

HMS Princess was a 44-gun fourth-rate frigate of the English Royal Navy, built at Lydney and launched in August 1660. By 1666 her armament had been increased to 52 guns.

Princess was broken up in November 1680.

== See also ==
- Henry Dawes (Royal Navy officer)

== Bibliography ==
- Allen, Joseph (1852). Battles of the British Navy. Vol. 2. London: Henry G. Bohn. p. 65.
- Clowes, William Laird (1898). The Royal Navy: A History From the Earliest Times to the Present. Vol. 2. London: Sampson Low, Marston and Company. pp. 435–436.
