= HMS Ossory (1682) =

Ship of the line of the Royal Navy

History

Great Britain
- Name: HMS Ossory
- Namesake: Thomas Butler, 6th Earl of Ossory; Prince George Augustus; Anne, Princess Royal and Princess of Orange
- Builder: Furzer, Portsmouth Dockyard
- Launched: 24 August 1682
- Renamed: HMS Prince, 1705; HMS Princess, 1716; HMS Princess Royal, 1728
- Fate: Broken up, 1773

General characteristics as built
- Class & type: 90-gun second rate ship of the line
- Tons burthen: 1,415
- Length: 161 ft (49.1 m) (gundeck)
- Beam: 44 ft 6 in (13.6 m)
- Depth of hold: 18 ft 2 in (5.5 m)
- Propulsion: Sails
- Sail plan: Full-rigged ship
- Armament: 90 guns of various weights of shot

General characteristics after 1711 rebuild
- Class & type: 1706 Establishment 90-gun second rate ship of the line
- Tons burthen: 1,551
- Length: 162 ft (49.4 m) (gundeck)
- Beam: 47 ft (14.3 m)
- Depth of hold: 18 ft 6 in (5.6 m)
- Propulsion: Sails
- Sail plan: Full-rigged ship
- Armament: 90 guns: Gundeck: 26 × 32-pdrs; Middle gundeck: 26 × 18-pdrs; Upper gundeck: 26 × 9-pdrs; Quarterdeck: 10 × 6-pdrs; Forecastle: 2 × 6-pdrs

HMS Ossory was a 90-gun second rate ship of the line of the Royal Navy, launched on 24 August 1682 at Portsmouth Dockyard. She was renamed HMS Prince in 1705.

Prince was rebuilt as a 90-gun second rate of the 1706 Establishment at Deptford Dockyard, from where she was relaunched on 21 July 1711. She was renamed HMS Princess on 2 January 1716, and subsequently renamed HMS Princess Royal on 26 July 1728.

Princess Royal continued to serve until 1773, when she was broken up.

Half plans of HMS Ossory
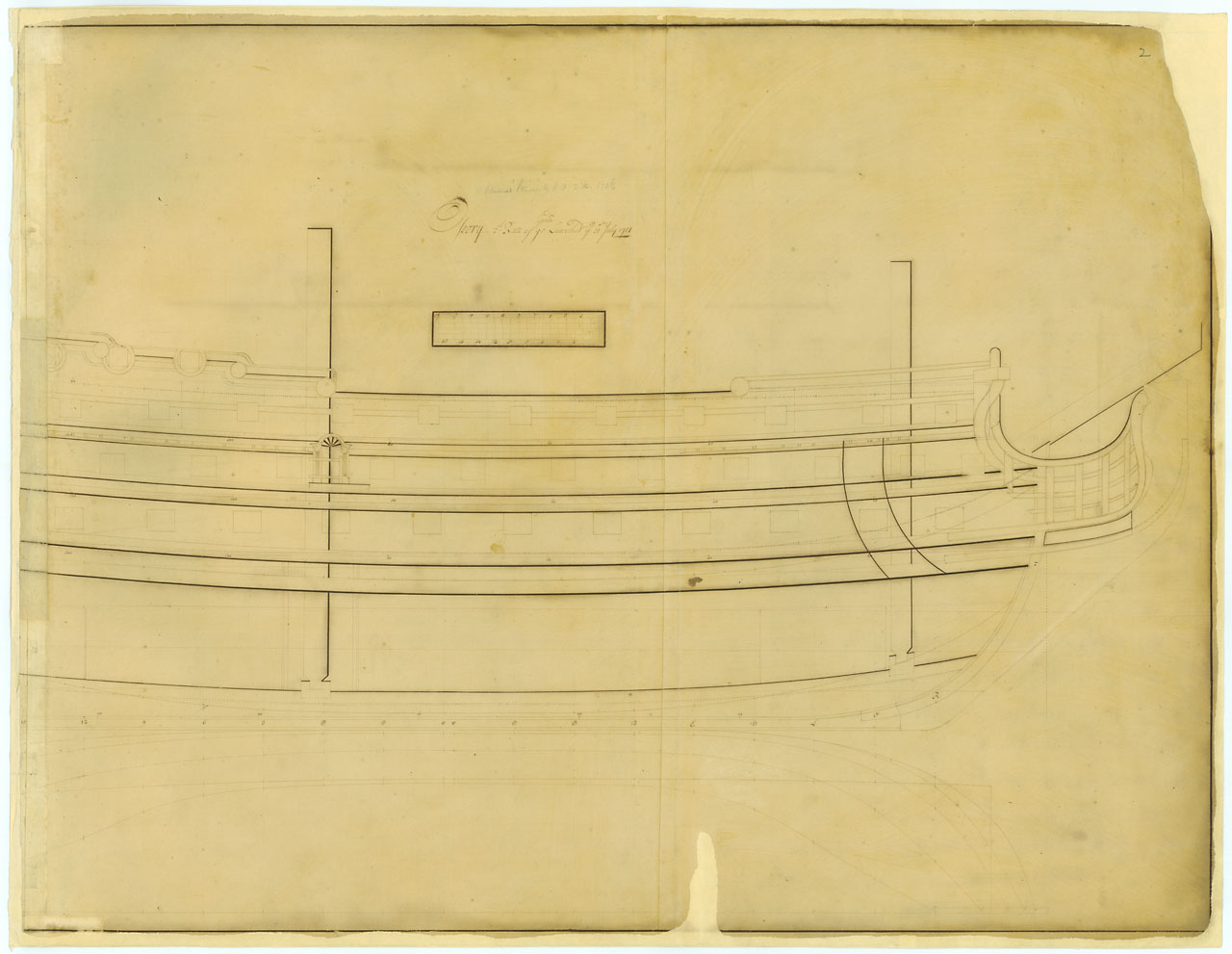
Half plan of HMS Ossory, showing decks.

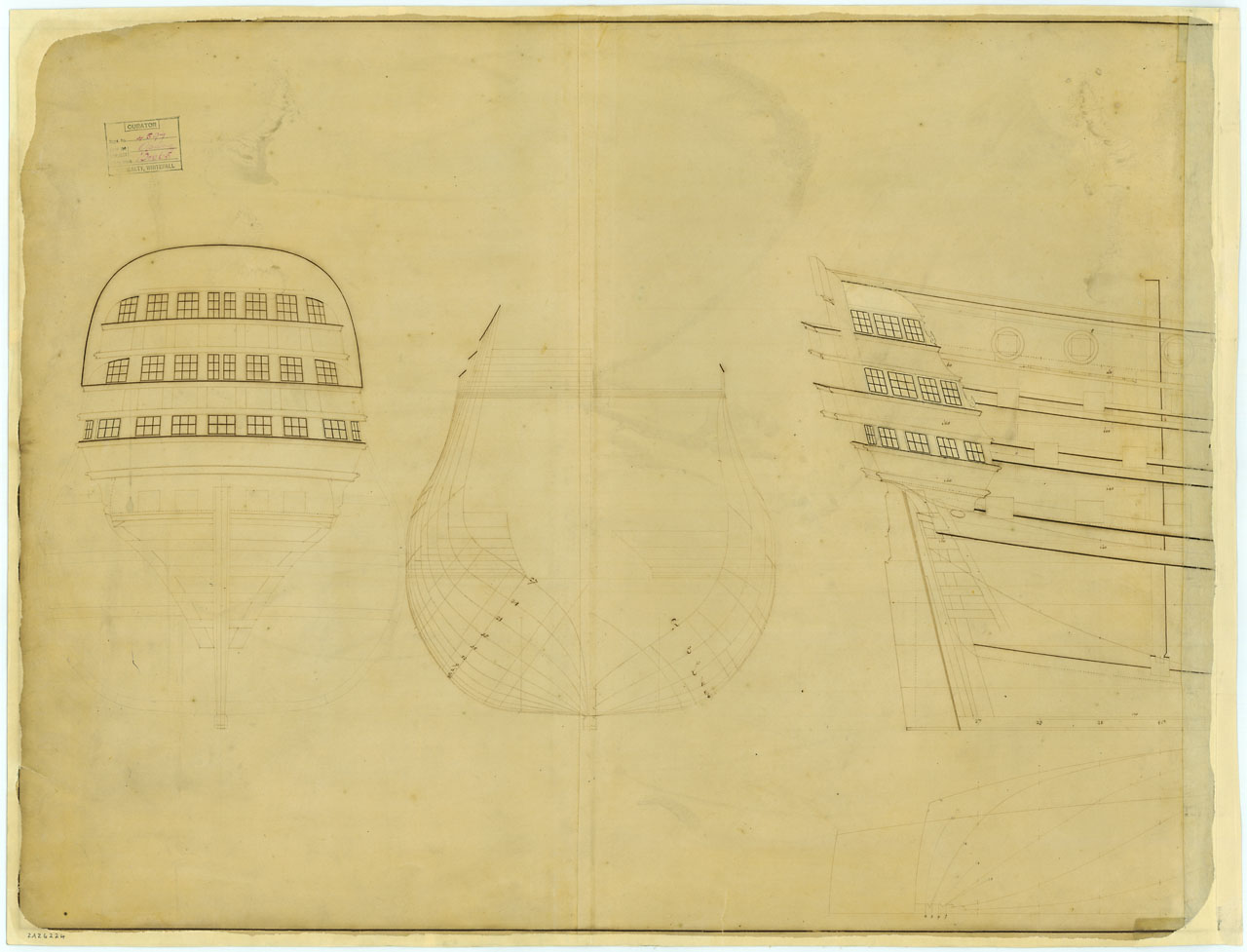
Half plan of HMS Ossory, showing lines.
