= Melville (name) =

Melville is a surname and a given name.

The surname has two different origins: Scottish and Irish. In Scotland, the name is a habitational name, originally of Norman origin, derived from any of several places called Malleville in Normandy. The place name Malleville is derived from the Latin elements malum ("bad") and villa ("country house"). In Ireland, the surname is an Anglicisation of the Gaelic Ó Maoilmhichíl, which means "descendant of Maoilmhichil". The Gaelic personal name Maoilmhichil means "devotee of (Saint) Michael". The surname is sometimes spelled without the terminal "e": Melvill.

The given name originates from England and Scotland. The name is derived from the Scottish surname.

Melville or Melvill may refer to:

== People ==
=== Surname ===
- Alan Melville (1910–1983), South African cricketer
- Alan Melville (writer) (1910–1983), English playwright and composer
- Alex Melville (disambiguation)
- Alexander Gordon Melville (1819–1901), Irish anatomist
- Alexander Melville, 5th Earl of Leven (died 1754)
- Andy Melville (born 1968), Welsh footballer
- Andrew Melville of Garvock (died 1617), Scottish courtier
- Andrew Melville (1545–1622), Scottish theologian
- Arthur Melville (1858–1904), Scottish painter
- Charles Melville (Medal of Honor) (1828–1867), American sailor
- Charles Melvill (1878–1925), British soldier with the New Zealand Military Forces
- Charles P. Melville, Professor of Persian History at Cambridge
- Christian Melville (1913–1984), Scottish rugby player
- Craig Melville (fl. 1990–2000s), Australian comedy director
- Cyron Melville (born 1984), Danish actor and musician
- Dan Melville (born 1956), American football player
- David Melville (disambiguation)
- Elizabeth Melville (1578–1640), Scottish poet
- Ellen Melville (1882–1946), New Zealand politician
- Emelie Melville (c. 1851–1932), actress in comic opera
- Esme Melville (1918–2006), Australian actor
- Francis Melville (disambiguation)
- Frank Melville (1903–1971), Australian football player
- Fred Melville (1882–1940), British philatelist
- George Melville, 1st Earl of Melville (1636–1707), Scottish aristocrat and statesman
- George W. Melville (1841–1912), American rear admiral, engineer, Arctic explorer and author
- Gertrude Melville (1884–1959), Australian politician
- Greg Melville (born 1970), American sportswriter
- Harry Melville (chemist) (1908–2000), British chemist and academic administrator
- Harry Melville (rugby league) (1930–1965), Australian rugby league player
- Henry Melvill (1798–1871), Anglican priest
- Henry Melville (1799–1873), Australian author
- Herman Melville (1819–1891), American author (Moby-Dick)
- James Cosmo Melvill (1792–1861), British administrator who served as the last secretary of the East India Company
- James Cosmo Melvill (naturalist) (1845–1929), British botanist and malacologist
- James Melville (disambiguation)
- Janet Melville (born 1958), English golfer
- Jean-Pierre Melville (1917–1973), French film director
- Jennie Melville, pen name of British crime fiction author Gwendoline Butler (1922–2013)
- John Melville (disambiguation)
- Josephine Melville (1961–2022), British actress, director and writer
- June Melville (1915–1970), English actress and theatre manager
- Ken Melville (born 1931), Australian football player
- Kerry Melville, birth name of Kerry Reid (born 1947), Australian tennis player
- Lee Melville (born 1970), Bahamian cricketer
- Leslie Melville (1902–2002), Australian economist
- Lewis Melville, pen name of British author Lewis Saul Benjamin (1874–1932)
- Lloyd Melville, Scottish politician
- Marvin Melville, American skier in the 1956, 1960 and 1964 Olympics - see United States at the 1956 Winter Olympics
- Michael Linning Melville (1805–1878), Sierra Leone politician
- Mike Melvill (1940–2026), South African-born American pilot
- Miranda Melville (born 1989), American racewalker
- Murray Melville, Scottish curler
- Neil Melville (fl. 1980s), Australian actor
- Nigel Melville (born 1961), British rugby player
- Ninian Melville (1843–1897), Australian political figure
- Paul Melville (1956–1978), Australian cricket player
- Pauline Melville (born 1948), Guyanese-born British actress and writer
- Philip Melvill (East India Company officer) (1796–1882), British official in India
- Robert Melville (disambiguation)
- Rodney Melville (fl. 1990–2000s), American judge
- Ronald Melville (botanist) (1903–1985), English botanist
- Rose Melville (1873–1946), American actor
- Sam Melville (1934–1971), American anarchist
- Sam Melville (actor) (1936–1989), American television actor
- Scott Melville (born 1966), American tennis player
- Stephen Melville (1904–1977), South African Air Force general
- Teignmouth Melvill (1842–1879), English lieutenant and recipient of the Victoria Cross
- Thomas Melvill (1726–1753), Scottish natural philosopher
- Thomas Melville (disambiguation)
- Velma Caldwell Melville (1852–1924), American writer and poet
- Ward Melville (1887–1977), American businessman and philanthropist
- William Melville, Lord Tongland (died 1613), Scottish diplomat
- William Melville (1850–1918), Irish law enforcement official
- William Bede Melville (1870–1914), Australian journalist and politician

=== Given name ===
- Melville E. Abrams (1912–1966), American politician
- Melville Arnott (1909–1999), British academic
- Melville Sewell Bagley (1838–1880), American-born Argentine businessman and winemaker
- Melville Baker (1901–1958), American film writer
- Melville W. Beardsley (1913–1998), American inventor
- Melville M. Bigelow (1846–1921), American legal academic
- Melville Reuben Bissell (1843–1889), American inventor and businessman
- Mel Brandt (1919–2008), American actor
- Melville W. Brown (1887–1938), American film director
- Melville Bull (1854–1909), American politician
- Mel Bungey (born 1934), Australian politician
- Melville Henry Cane (1879–1980), American poet and lawyer
- Melville Cook (1912–1993), British musician
- Mel Cooke (1934–2013), New Zealand rugby player
- Melville Cooper (1896–1973), British actor
- Melville De Lloyd (1917–1985), Welsh rugby player
- Melville Dewey (1851–1931), American library classification expert
- Melville Eastham (1885–1964), American radio executive
- Melville Fuller (1833–1910), American judge
- Melville Gideon (1884–1933), American musician and composer
- Melville S. Green (1922–1979), American physicist
- Melville Bell Grosvenor (1901–1982), American magazine editor
- Melville Guest (born 1943), British diplomat and cricketer
- Melville Hatch (1898–1988), American entomologist
- Melville J. Herskovits (1895–1963), American anthropologist
- Melville R. Hopewell (1845–1911), American politician
- Melville E. Ingalls (1842–1914), American politician
- Melville Jacobs (1902–1971), American anthropologist
- Melville James (1877–1957), Australian Anglican bishop
- Melville Jones (1866–1941), Anglican bishop
- Melville Clyde Kelly (1883–1935), American politician
- Melville D. Landon (1839–1910), American journalist and humorist
- Melville H. Long (1889–1969), American tennis player
- Melville Lyons (1889–1955), New Zealand politician
- Melville Douglas Mackenzie (1889–1972), British physician and epidemiologist
- Melville Macnaghten (1853–1921), British politician
- Melville Henry Massue (1868–1921), British genealogist and author
- Melville McKee (born 1994), British race car driver
- Melville de Mellow (1913–1989), Indian radio personality
- Mel Merritt (1897–1986), American football player
- Melville Nimmer (1923–1985), American lawyer
- Melville Pengelly (1901–1973), New Zealand cricket umpire
- Melvil Poupaud (born 1973), French actor, author and filmmaker
- Melville Portal (1819–1904), British politician
- Melville Davisson Post (1869–1930), American author
- Melville Marks Robinson (1888–1974), Canadian athlete and sports organizer
- Melville Rogers (1899–1973), Canadian figure skater
- Melville Ruick (1898–1972), American actor and musician
- Melville Ryan (1933–2015), British cricket player
- Melville J. Salter (1834–1896), American politician
- Melville Amasa Scovell (1855–1912), American academic
- Melville Shavelson (1917–2007), American film director
- Melville J. Shaw (1872–1927), American Marine Corps colonel
- Melville Shyer (1895–1968), American film director
- Mel Spence (1936–2012), Jamaican sprinter
- Melville Y. Stewart (1935–2020), American educator
- Melville Elijah Stone (1848–1929), American newspaper executive
- Melville Vail (1906–1983), Canadian hockey player
- Melville Waddington (1895–1945), Canadian pilot
- Melville Wallace (1887–1943), South African sports shooter

=== Middle name ===
- Wynne Melville Jones (born 1947), Welsh artist

== Fictional characters ==
- Melville Crump, Sid Caesar's character in the 1963 motion picture It's a Mad, Mad, Mad, Mad World
- Melville, pet of character Chuckie Finster in the animated television series Rugrats

== See also ==
- Ronald Ruthven Leslie-Melville, 11th Earl of Leven (1835–1906)
