= James Melville =

James Melville or Melvill may refer to:

- James Melville (Scottish minister) (1556–1614), Scottish divine and reformer
- James Melville of Halhill (1535–1617), Scottish diplomat and memoir writer
- James Melville (politician) (1885–1931), British Labour Party Member of Parliament for Gateshead 1929–1931
- James Melville (author) (1931–2014), pseudonym of British author Roy Peter Martin
- James Melville (cricketer, born 1909) (1909–1961), English cricketer for Warwickshire
- James Melville (cricketer, born 1936) (1936–2016), English cricketer for Kent
- James Cosmo Melvill (1792–1861), British administrator of the East India Company
- James Cosmo Melvill (naturalist) (1845–1929), British botanist and malacologist
- James D. Melville Jr. (born 1957), American statesman

== See also ==
- Melville (name)
