= Adelphi, London =

District of London in the City of Westminster

Coordinates: 51°30′33″N 0°07′21″W

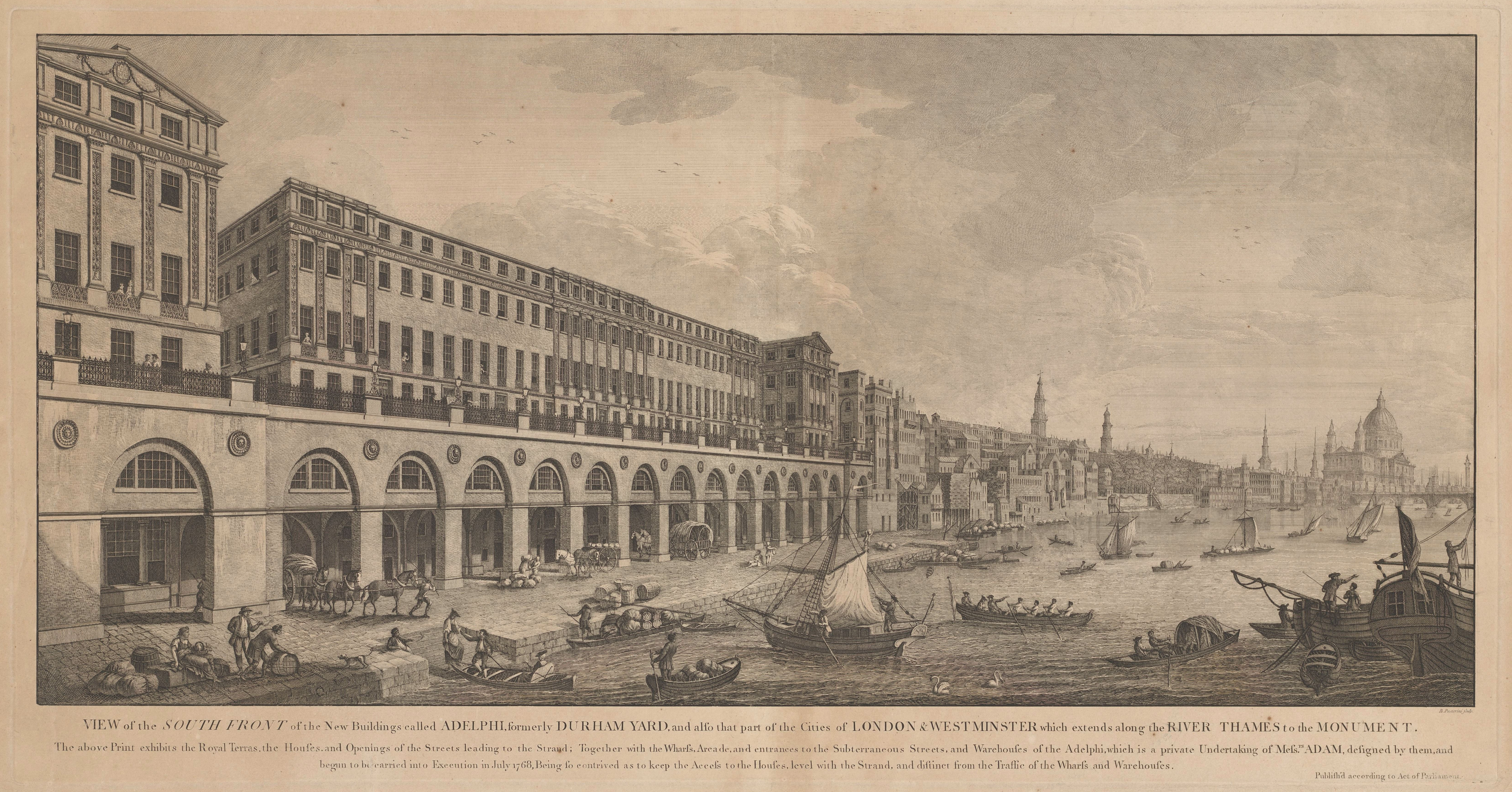
The Adam Brothers' Adelphi Terrace (1768–72) was London's first neoclassical building. Eleven large houses fronted a vaulted terrace, with wharves beneath that were known as the 'Adelphi Arches'.

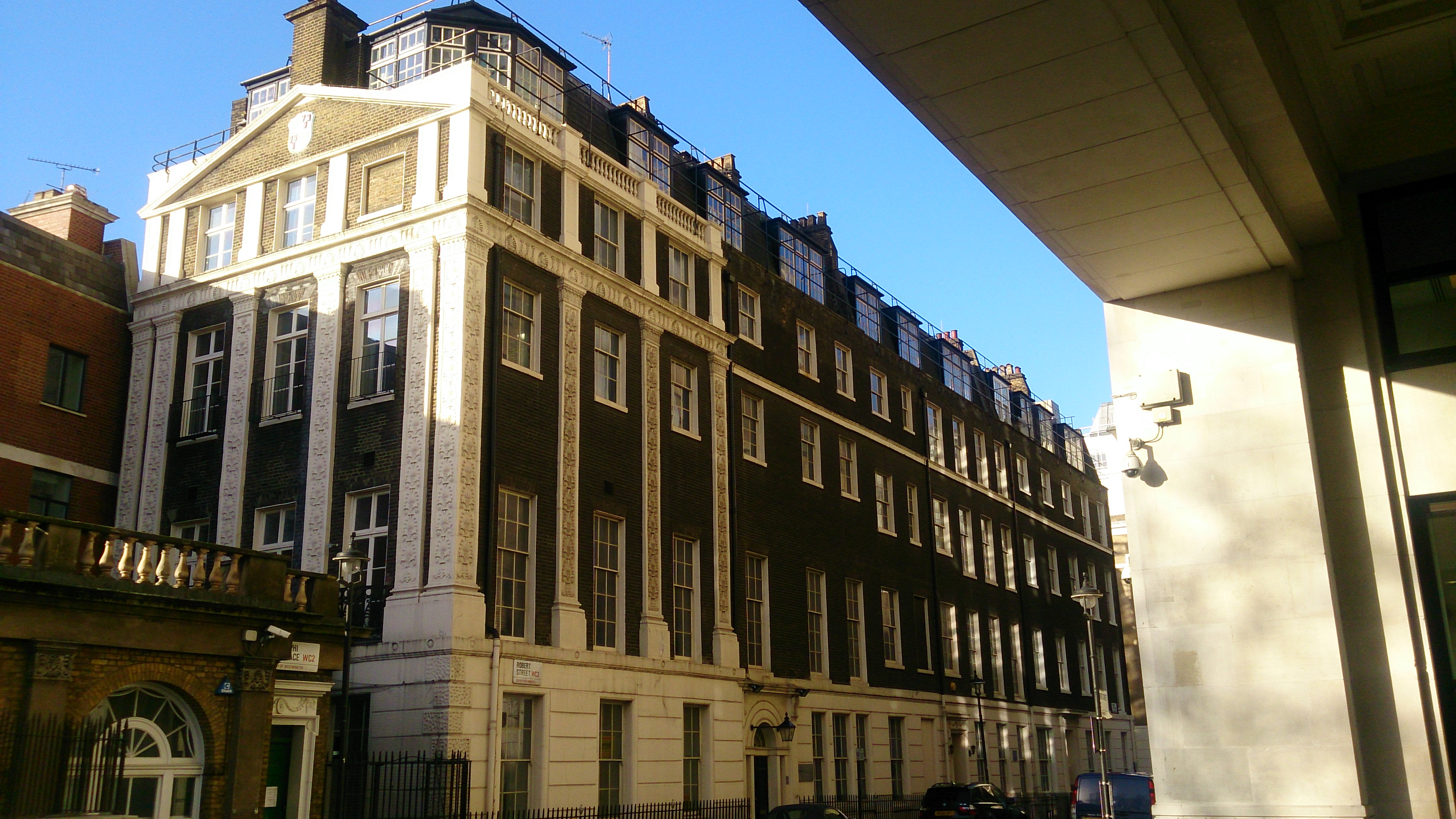
Current view of the remaining building at 11 Adelphi Terrace, the furthest left house of the original buildings when viewed from the river.

Adelphi (/əˈdɛlfi/; from the Greek ἀδελφοί adelphoi, meaning "brothers") is a district of the City of Westminster in Greater London. It includes what remains of the streets of Adelphi Terrace, Robert Street and John Adam Street.

The district is named after Adelphi Terrace, which was a block of 24 unified neoclassical terrace houses, which occupied the land between The Strand and the River Thames, that were built between 1768 and 1772 by the Adam brothers (John, Robert, James and William), to whom the terrace's Greek-derived name refers.

Most of Adelphi Terrace was demolished in the 1930s and replaced with the Art Deco New Adelphi building. The district, which retains the name of the demolished terrace, is now grouped with Aldwych as the greater Strand district (a main street of London between the two areas and those immediately adjoining) which for many decades formed a parliamentary constituency and civil registration district.

== Adelphi Terrace ==
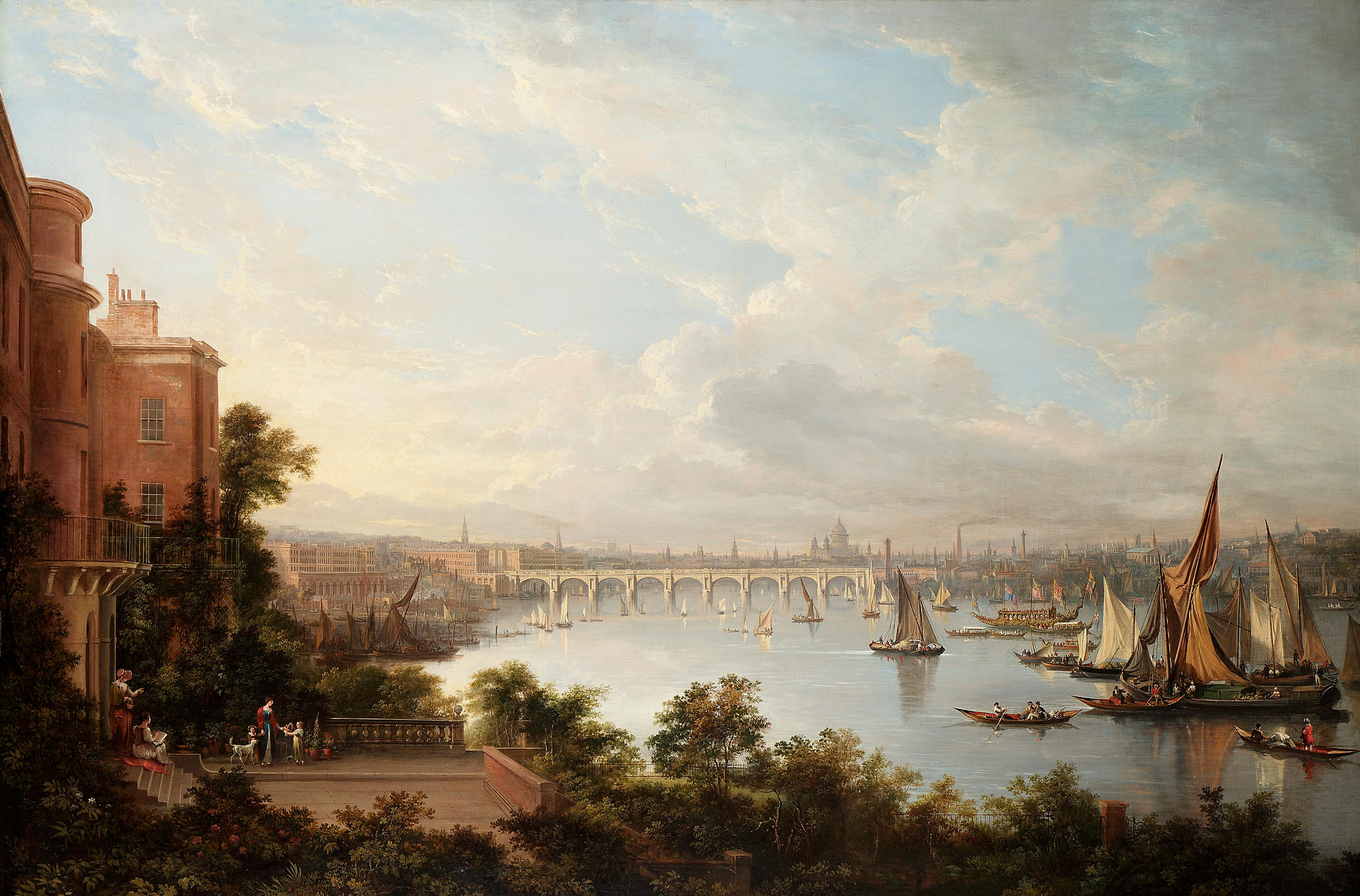
A prospect of London by Alexander Nasmyth, 1826. The Adelphi Buildings can be seen to the left of Waterloo Bridge.

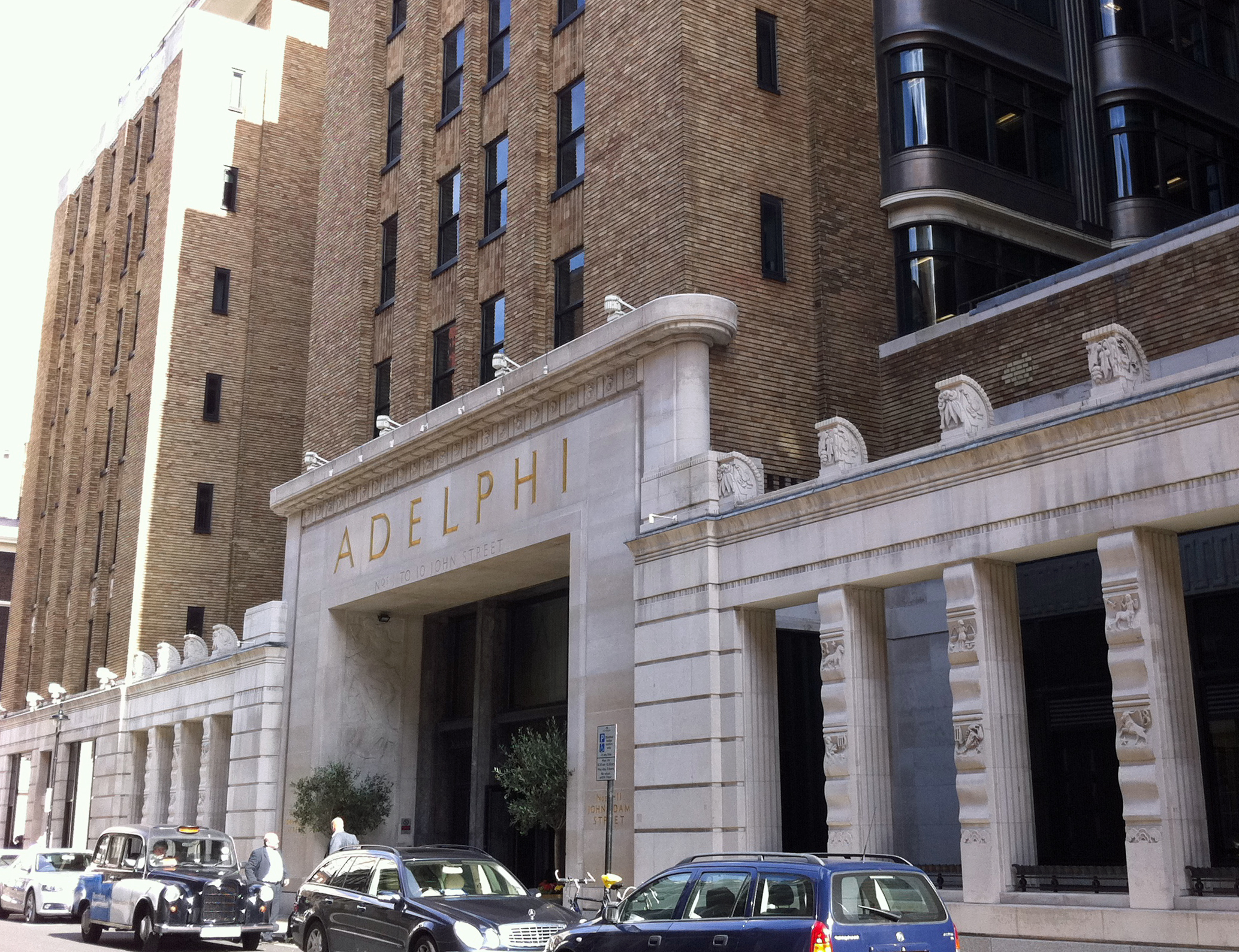
The Art Deco Adelphi building from the 1930s, located at 1-11 John Adam Street.

The district is named after Adelphi Terrace, which was a block of 24 unified neoclassical terrace houses, which occupied the land between The Strand and the River Thames in the parish of St Martin in the Fields, that were built between 1768 and 1772 by the Adam brothers (John, Robert, James and William), to whom the terrace's Greek-derived name refers. Robert Adam's design was influenced by his visit to Diocletian's Palace in Split, Dalmatia (present day Croatia).

The ruins of Durham House on the site were demolished for its construction. The nearby Adelphi Theatre is named after Adelphi Terrace.

Most of Adelphi Terrace was itself demolished in the early 1930s and replaced with the Art Deco New Adelphi building by the firm of Collcutt & Hamp. Surviving buildings from the original Adelphi Terrace include 11 Adelphi Terrace (formerly occupied by numismatic specialists A.H. Baldwin & Sons Ltd) and the Royal Society of Arts headquarters (which has expanded to incorporate two of the former houses). Benjamin Pollock's Toy Shop was located here in the 1940s.

== Notable institutions ==
=== South Australian Colonization Commission ===
The South Australian Colonization Commission (1834–1843) had their offices at 6 Adelphi Terrace in 1840. Rowland Hill was secretary to this body, and it was during this period that he devised his penny postage scheme.

=== London School of Economics ===
The London School of Economics (LSE) held its first classes in October 1895, in rooms at 9 John Street, Adelphi, before setting up more permanent operations in Number 10 Adelphi Terrace. By 1920, the LSE had moved a few blocks east, to its current Clare Market address. While in Adelphi, the LSE's scholars and students were active in the surrounding neighbourhood and community.

== Street name etymologies ==
Crop of Christopher and John Greenwood's 8 inch-to-mile map published in 1827 from an 1830 republication (click to view all). The Adelphi is south of the Strand.

Adelphi has no formally defined boundaries, though they are generally agreed to be: Strand to the north, Lancaster Place to the east, Victoria Embankment to the south and Charing Cross station to the west. The small set of streets east of Northumberland Avenue are included here for convenience.

Several streets are or were named using the words George Villiers, Duke of Buckingham after the first Duke, 17th century courtier, who acquired York House which formerly stood on this site; his son sold the area to developers on condition that his father and titles were commemorated on the new streets.

- Adam Street – after John and Robert Adam, who built the Adelphi development in the 1760s
- Adelphi Terrace – the area was developed by the brothers John and Robert Adam, in the 1760s, and was named after adelphos, the Greek for 'brother'
- The Arches – presumably descriptive, after the railway arches here
- Buckingham Arcade and Buckingham Street – after George Villiers, 1st Duke of Buckingham
- Carting Lane – thought to be from the carts that brought good to and from the wharf formerly located here; until the 1830s it was called Dirty Lane
- Charing Cross – after the Eleanor cross at Charing, from the Old English word "cierring", referring to a bend in the River Thames
- Corner House Street – created as part of a 1980s development on the site of the Strand Corner House, opened in 1915 as one of the Lyons Corner Houses
- Craven Passage and Craven Street – after William Craven, 3rd Baron Craven, who owned the land when the street was built in the 1730s
- Durham House Street – this was the former site of Durham House, a palace belonging to the bishops of Durham in medieval times. Combines three former streets: James Street, William Street and Durham Street.
- Embankment Place – after the Thames Embankment, built in the Victorian era
- George Court – after George Villiers, 1st Duke of Buckingham
- Hungerford Lane (formerly Brewers Lane) – after the Hungerford family, who owned a house on this site in the 15th century, later sold due to debts to create Hungerford Market, before the building of Charing Cross station
- Ivybridge Lane – named after a former ivy-covered bridge that crossed an old watercourse on this spot; the bridge was demolished sometime before 1600
- John Adam Street – after John Adam, who built the Adelphi development with his brother Robert in the 1760s, a combination of the previous John Street and Duke Street with the latter named after the 1st Duke of Buckingham
- Lancaster Place – former site of the Savoy Palace. It passed into the ownership of the earls of Lancaster in the 13th century, the most famous of which was John of Gaunt, who owned the palace at the times of its destruction in Peasant's Revolt of 1381
- Northumberland Avenue and Northumberland Street – site of the former Northumberland House, built originally in the early 17th century for the earls of Northampton and later acquired by the earls of Northumberland
- Robert Street and Lower Robert Street – after Robert Adam, who built the Adelphi development with his brother John in the 1760s
- Savoy Buildings, Savoy Court, Savoy Hill, Savoy Place, Savoy Row, Savoy Steps, Savoy Street and Savoy Way – the former site of the Savoy Palace, built for Peter II, Count of Savoy in 1245
- Strand and Strand Lane – from Old English 'stond', meaning the edge of a river; the river Thames formerly reached here prior to the building of the Thames Embankment
- Victoria Embankment – after Queen Victoria, reigning queen at the time of the building of the Thames Embankment
- Villiers Street – after George Villiers, 1st Duke of Buckingham
- Watergate Walk – after a former watergate built in 1626 for George Villiers, 1st Duke of Buckingham as an entrance for the former York House
- York Buildings and York Place – a house was built on this site in the 14th century for the bishops of Norwich – in the reign of Queen Mary it was acquired by the archbishops of York and named 'York House'; York Place was formerly 'Of Alley', after the 1st Duke of Buckingham

== Notable residents ==
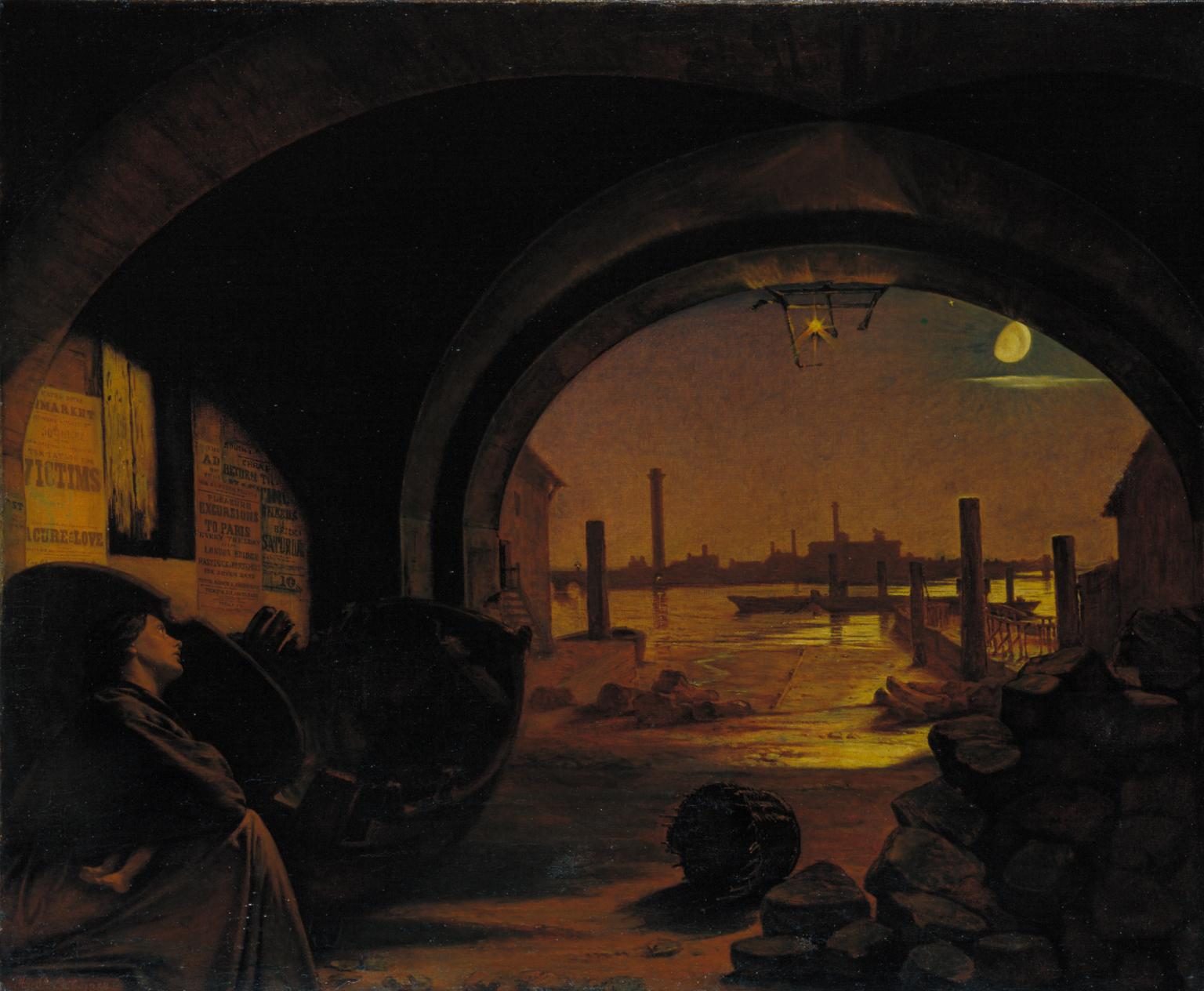
Past and Present, no. 3 Despair, by Augustus Egg, 1858, set in the Adelphi Arches

- Sir J. M. Barrie (1860-1937), playwright, novelist, and author of Peter Pan, or the Boy Who Wouldn't Grow Up. He first moved to the terrace in 1909, after a divorce. He lived on the third floor of No. 3 until 1917, when he moved up to the 4th floor until his death in 1937.
- Edward Litt Laman Blanchard (1820-1889), writer, lived in Adelphi Terrace from 1876 to 1889.
- Charles Booth (1840-1916), shipyard owner, philanthropist and author.
- Richard D'Oyly Carte (1844-1901), Victorian impresario.
- John Galsworthy (1867-1933), novelist, author of The Forsyte Saga
- David Garrick (1717-1779) lived for his final seven years, and died in 1779, in the centre house of the buildings (no. 5)
- James Graham (1745-1794), electrical quack sexologist, lived at 4 Adelphi Terrace from 1778 to 1781, opening his Temple of Health there in 1780.
- Thomas Hardy (1840-1928), English novelist.
- Thomas Monro (1759-1833) physician to George III and art patron, owned a house in Adelphi Terrace.
- George Bernard Shaw (1856-1950) Irish playwright, Fabian socialist, co-founder of the London School of Economics and Political Science (LSE)

== In media ==
- David Copperfield, created by Charles Dickens, lived on Buckingham Street in Adelphi.
- Fictional detective Gideon Fell, created by John Dickson Carr, lived at no. 1, Adelphi Terrace.
- The 1930s Adelphi building was used for some scenes in ITV's Agatha Christie's Poirot episode "The Theft of the Royal Ruby", and in episode "The Plymouth Express".
- In an instalment of E.M. Delafield's semi-autobiographical Diary of a Provincial Lady series, entitled The Provincial Lady in Wartime, the eponymous protagonist works in the canteen of an air raid shelter located under the Adelphi during the Phoney War. Much of the narrative is dedicated to describing the atmosphere and inhabitants of the building and the surrounding area, and many of the events of the book take place here.
- Cora Harrison's Season of darkness revolves around No. 5 Adelphi Terrace.

== See also ==
- List of demolished buildings and structures in London
