= Thomas Melville =

Thomas Melville or Melvill may refer to:

- Thomas Melvill (1726–1753), Scottish natural philosopher
- Thomas Melvill (American patriot) (1751–1832), American merchant, participant in the Boston Tea Party, Revolutionary War major and state legislator
- Thomas Melville, younger brother of Herman Melville
- Thomas Melville (Southgate) (died 1942), member of Southgate Urban District Council
- Thomas Melville (writer), American priest, activist and writer
