= John Melville (disambiguation) =

John Melville is the name of:

- John Melville (1902–1986), British painter
- John Melville of Glenbervie (died c. 1420), Scottish sheriff and murder victim
- John Melville of Raith (died 1548), Scottish laird
- John Melville, 3rd Lord Melville (died 1643) - see Earl of Melville
- John Melville (lord provost) (1802–1860), Scottish lawyer and Lord Provost of Edinburgh
- John Melville (cricketer) (1895–1951), Scottish cricket player

== See also ==
- John Leslie-Melville, 12th Earl of Leven (1886–1913), Scottish soldier and banker
