= Gas lighting =

Types of lighting device which burn gas fuel

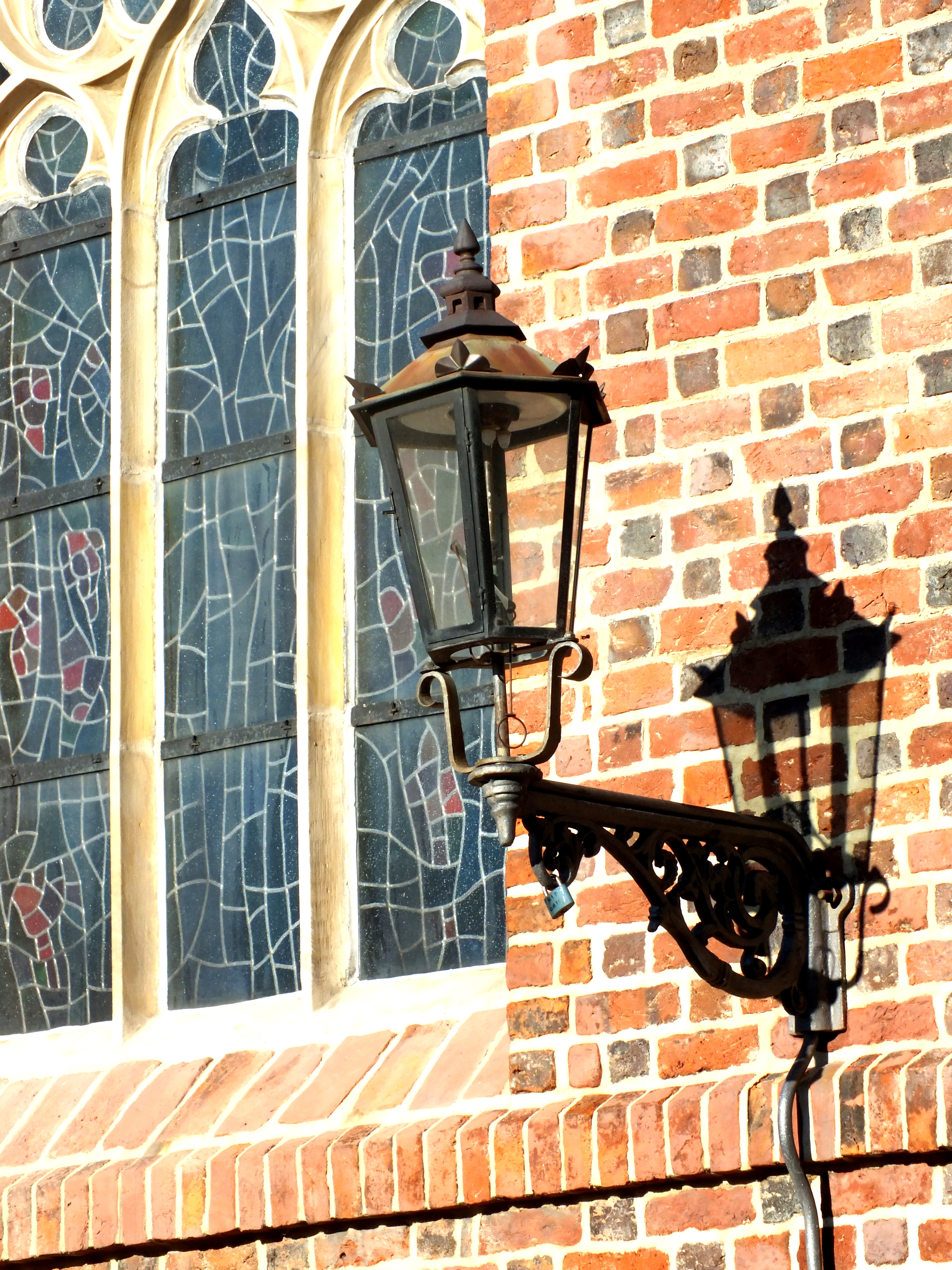
Gas lighting in the historical centre of Wrocław, Poland, is manually turned off and on daily.

Gas lighting is the production of artificial light by burning a fuel gas. Light may be produced directly by the flame or indirectly by heating another material to incandescence, as in a gas mantle or limelight. During the period when gas lighting was widespread, its principal fuel was coal gas; natural gas later replaced coal gas in many places.

Experiments with combustible gases preceded the practical development of gas lighting, but widespread use began in the early 19th century. William Murdoch demonstrated coal-gas lighting in Britain in the 1790s and early 1800s, and gas lighting subsequently spread through cities in Europe and North America. During the 19th century it was used extensively for streets, homes, factories, and theatres. In theatres, gas lighting allowed brighter stages and more centralized control of illumination, but also created heat, fire, and explosion hazards.

From the late 19th century, gas lighting was progressively displaced by electric lighting as electrical distribution systems improved. It nevertheless survives in some historic districts, where gas street lamps are preserved or restored. Berlin retains the world's largest network of gas street lamps. Gas is still occasionally used for camp lighting.

== History of gas lighting ==
=== Background ===
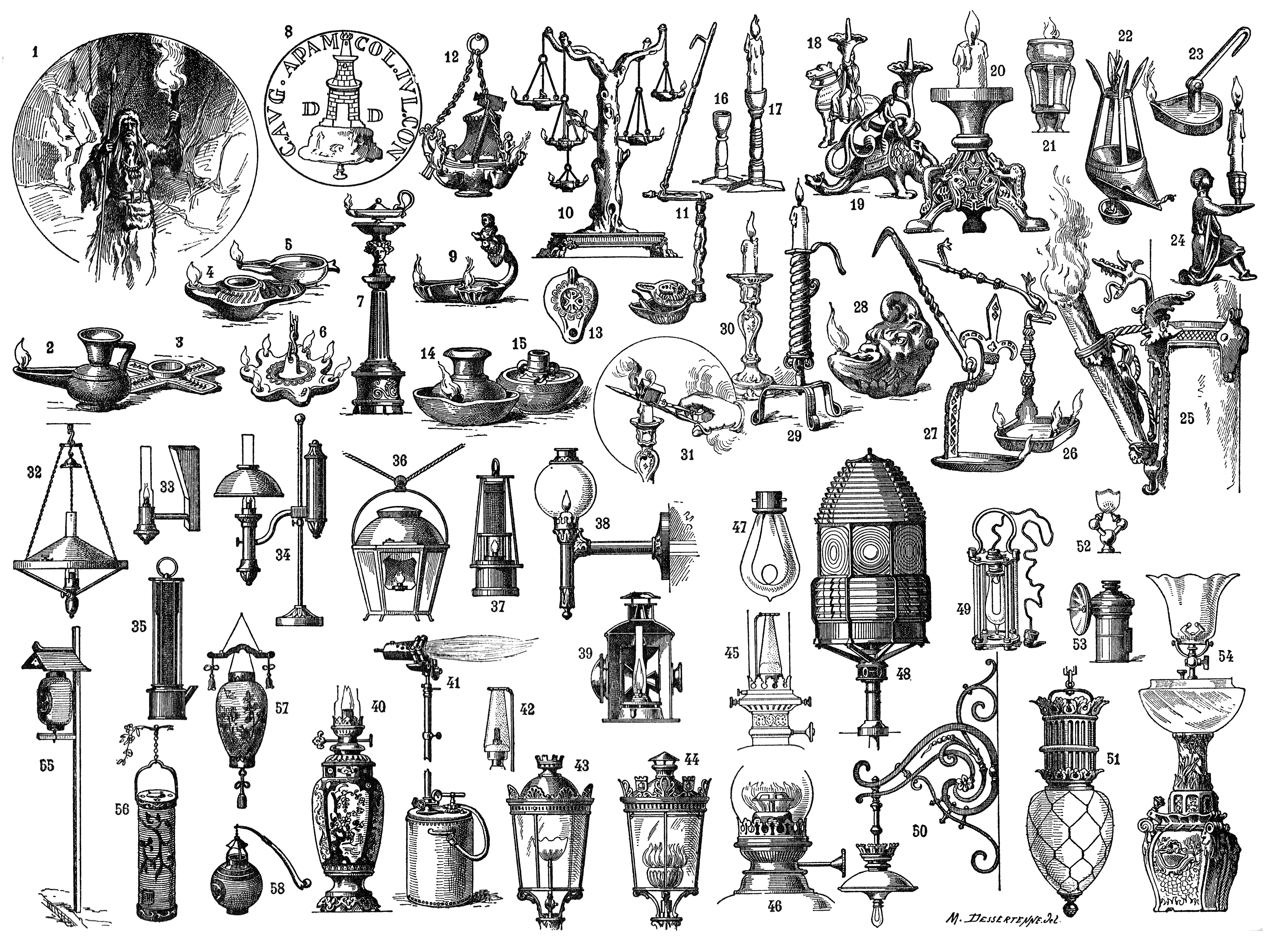
An illustration of designs of lamplights, c. 1900

Prior to use of gaseous fuels for lighting, the early lighting fuels consisted of olive oil, beeswax, fish oil, whale oil, sesame oil, nut oil, or other similar substances, which were all liquid fuels. These were the most commonly used fuels until the late 18th century. Whale oil was especially widely used for lighting in European cities such as London through the early 19th century.

Chinese records dating back 1,700 years indicate the use of natural gas in homes for lighting and heating. The natural gas was transported by means of bamboo pipes to homes.

Public illumination preceded the adoption of gas lighting by centuries. In 1417, Sir Henry Barton, Lord Mayor of London, ordained "Lanthornes with lights to bee hanged out on the Winter evening betwixt Hallowtide and Candlemasse." Paris was first illuminated by an order issued in 1524, and, in the beginning of the 16th century, the inhabitants were ordered to keep lights burning in the windows of all houses that faced streets. In 1668, when some regulations were made for improving the streets of London, the residents were reminded to hang out their lanterns at the usual time, and, in 1690, an order was issued to hang out a light, or lamp, every night at nightfall, from Michaelmas to Christmas. By an Act of the Common Council in 1716, all housekeepers, whose houses faced any street, lane, or passage, were required to hang out, every dark night, one or more lights, to burn from six to eleven o'clock, under the penalty of one shilling as a fine for failing to do so.

Accumulating and escaping gases were known originally among coal miners for their adverse effects rather than their useful characteristics. Coal miners described two types of gases, one called the choke damp and the other fire damp. In 1667, a paper describing how in Lancashire gas escaping from a coal pit underground could be lit at the surface of a nearby spring.

British clergyman and scientist Stephen Hales experimented with the actual distillation of coal, thereby obtaining a flammable liquid. He reported his results in the first volume of his Vegetable Statics, published in 1726. From the distillation of "one hundred and fifty-eight grains [10.2 g] of Newcastle coal, he stated that he obtained 180 cubic inches [2.9 L] of gas, which weighed 51 grains [3.3 g], being nearly one third of the whole." Hales's results garnered attention decades later as the unique chemical properties of various gases became understood through the work of Joseph Black, Henry Cavendish, Alessandro Volta, and others.

A 1733 publication by Sir James Lowther in the Philosophical Transactions of the Royal Society detailed some properties of coal gas, including its flammability. Lowther demonstrated the principal properties of coal gas to different members of the Royal Society. He showed that the gas retained its flammability after storage for some time. The demonstration did not result in identification of utility.

Minister and experimentalist John Clayton referred to coal gas as the "spirit" of coal. He discovered its flammability by an accident. The "spirit" he isolated from coal caught fire by coming in contact with a candle as it escaped from a fracture in one of his distillation vessels. He stored the coal gas in bladders, and at times he entertained his friends by demonstrating the flammability of the gas. Clayton published his findings in Philosophical Transactions.

=== Early technology ===
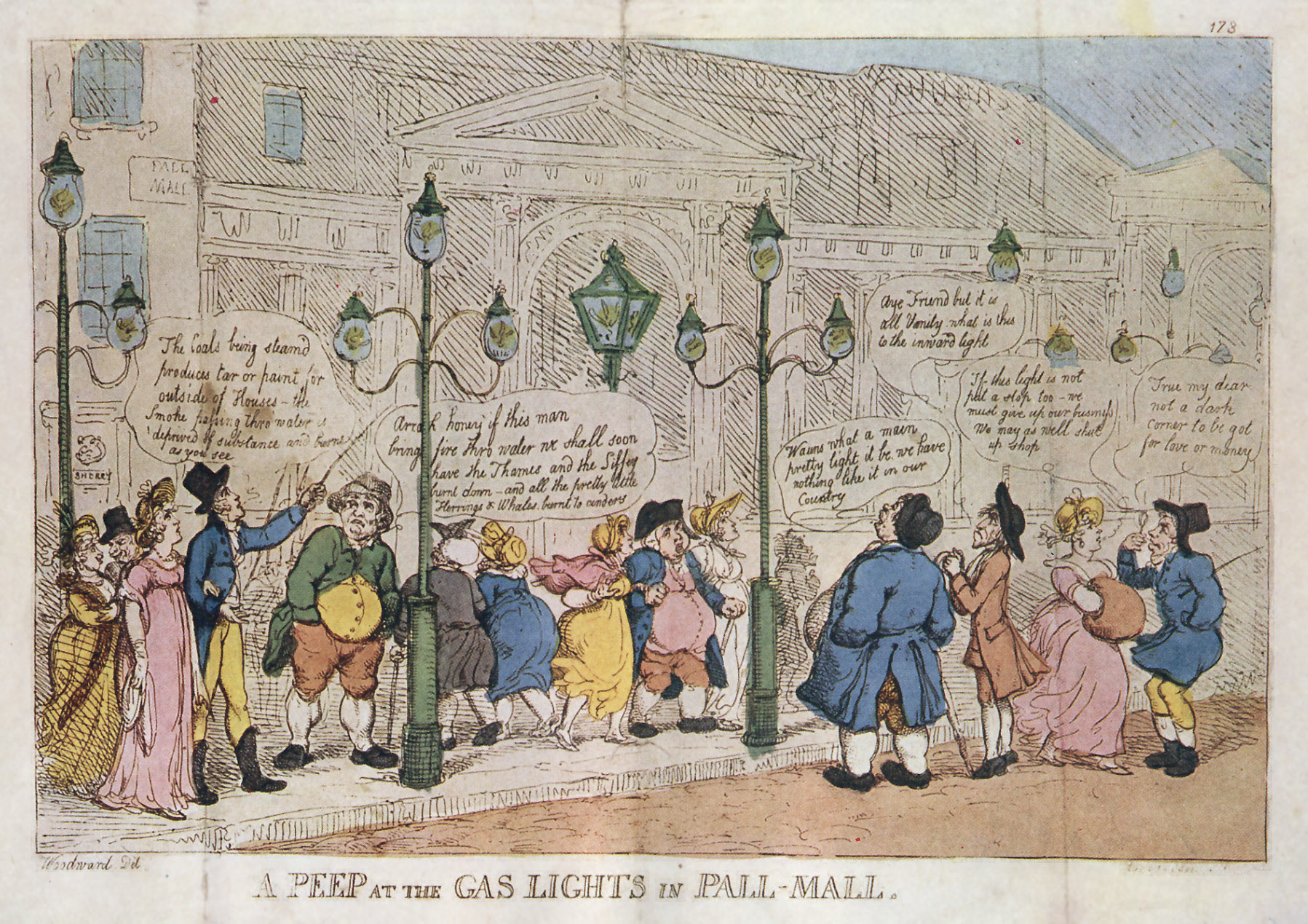
Passersby marvel at new gaslighting (London, 1809)

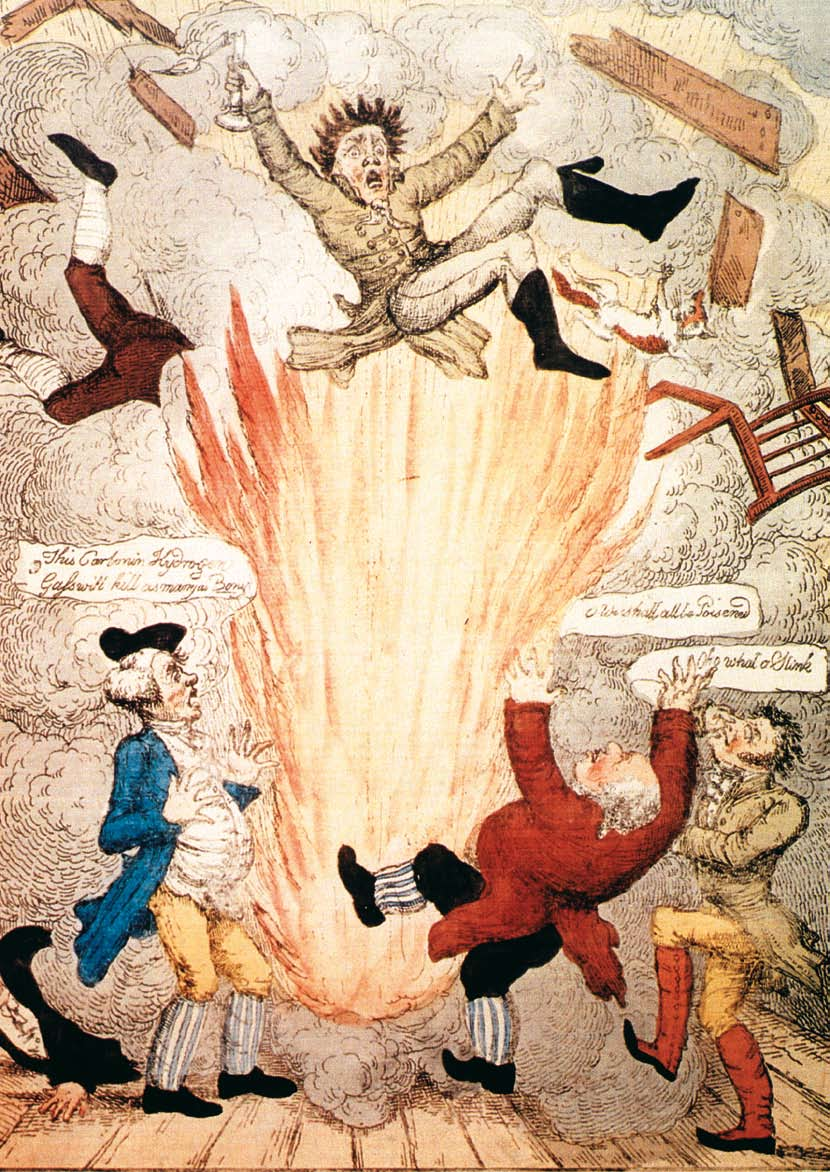
Satirical cartoon showing dangers of early gaslighting (London, 1813)

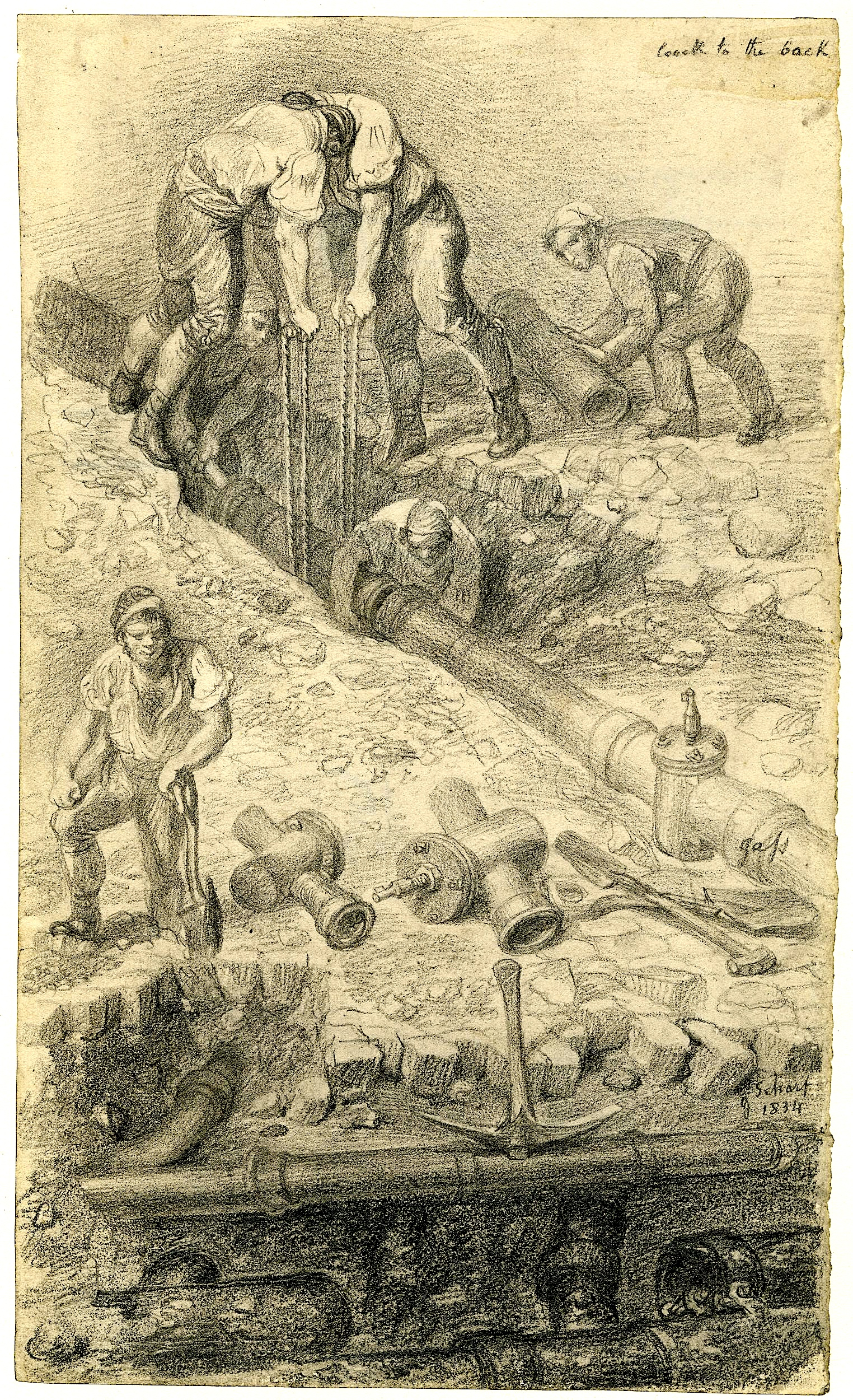
Workmen laying gas pipes under London's streets (George Scharf, British Museum)

It took nearly 200 years for gas to become accessible for commercial use. A Flemish alchemist, Jan Baptista van Helmont, was the first person to formally recognize gas as a state of matter. He would go on to identify several types of gases, including carbon dioxide. Over one hundred years later in 1733, Sir James Lowther had some of his miners working on a water pit for his mine. While digging the pit they hit a pocket of gas. Lowther took a sample of the gas and took it home to do some experiments. He noted, "The said air being put into a bladder … and tied close, may be carried away, and kept some days, and being afterwards pressed gently through a small pipe into the flame of a candle, will take fire, and burn at the end of the pipe as long as the bladder is gently pressed to feed the flame, and when taken from the candle after it is so lighted, it will continue burning till there is no more air left in the bladder to supply the flame." Lowther had basically discovered the principle behind gas lighting.

Later in the 18th century William Murdoch (sometimes spelled "Murdock") stated: "the gas obtained by distillation from coal, peat, wood and other inflammable substances burnt with great brilliancy upon being set fire to … by conducting it through tubes, it might be employed as an economical substitute for lamps and candles." Murdoch's first invention was a lantern with a gas-filled bladder attached to a jet. He would use this to walk home at night. After seeing how well this worked he decided to light his home with gas. In 1797, Murdoch installed gas lighting in his new home as well as the workshop in which he worked. "This work was of a large scale, and he next experimented to find better ways of producing, purifying, and burning the gas." The foundation had been laid for companies to start producing gas and other inventors to start playing with ways of using the new technology.

Murdoch was the first to exploit the flammability of gas for the practical application of lighting. He worked for Matthew Boulton and James Watt at their Soho Foundry steam engine works in Birmingham, England. In the early 1790s, while overseeing the use of his company's steam engines in tin mining in Cornwall, Murdoch began experimenting with various types of gas, finally settling on coal gas as the most effective. He first lit his own house in Redruth, Cornwall in 1792. In 1798, he used gas to light the main building of the Soho Foundry and in 1802 lit the outside in a public display of gas lighting, the lights astonishing the local population. One of the employees at the Soho Foundry, Samuel Clegg, saw the potential of this new form of lighting. Clegg left his job to set up his own gas lighting business, the Gas Light and Coke Company.

A "thermolampe" using gas distilled from wood was patented in 1799, while German inventor Friedrich Winzer (Frederick Albert Winsor) was the first person to patent coal-gas lighting in 1804.

In 1801, Phillipe Lebon of Paris had also used gas lights to illuminate his house and gardens, and was considering how to light all of Paris. In 1820, Paris adopted gas street lighting.

In 1804, William Henry delivered a course of lectures on chemistry, at Manchester, in which he showed the mode of producing gas from coal, and the facility and advantage of its use. Henry analysed the composition and investigated the properties of carburetted hydrogen gas (i.e. methane). His experiments were numerous and accurate and made upon a variety of substances; having obtained the gas from wood, peat, different kinds of coal, oil, wax, etc., he quantified the intensity of the light from each source.

In 1806 The Philips and Lee factory and a portion of Chapel Street in Salford, Lancashire were lit by gas, thought to be the first use of gas street lighting in the world.

Josiah Pemberton, an inventor, had for some time been experimenting on the nature of gas. A resident of Birmingham, his attention may have been roused by the exhibition at Soho. About 1806, he exhibited gas lights in a variety of forms and with great brilliance at the front of his factory in Birmingham. In 1808 he constructed an apparatus, applicable for several uses, for Benjamin Cooke, a manufacturer of brass tubes, gilt toys, and other articles.

In 1808, Murdoch presented to the Royal Society a paper entitled "Account of the Application of Gas from Coal to Economical Purposes" in which he described his successful application of coal gas to light the extensive establishment of Messrs. Phillips and Lea. For this paper he was awarded Count Rumford's gold medal. Murdoch's statements threw great light on the comparative advantage of gas and candles, and contained much useful information on the expenses of production and management.

Although the history is uncertain, David Melville has been credited with the first house and street lighting in the United States, in either 1805 or 1806 in Newport, Rhode Island.

In 1809, accordingly, the first application was made to Parliament to incorporate a company in order to accelerate the process, but the bill failed to pass. In 1810, however, the application was renewed by the same parties, and though some opposition was encountered and considerable expense incurred, the bill passed, but not without great alterations; and the London and Westminster Gas Light and Coke Company was established. Less than two years later, on 31 December 1813, Westminster Bridge was lit by gas.

=== Widespread use ===
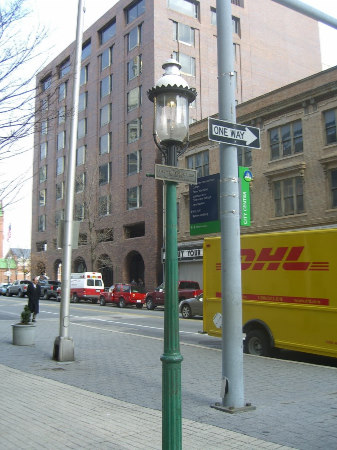
Commemoration of the first US street gas light, at the intersection of North Holliday Street and East Baltimore Street in Baltimore

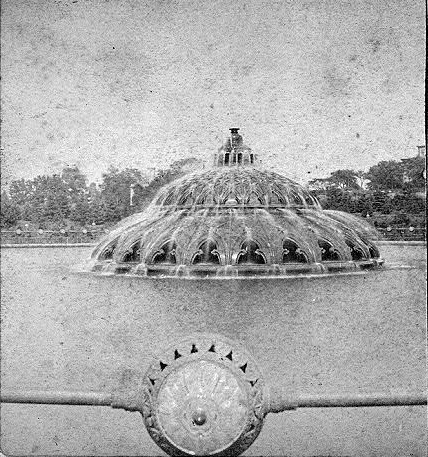
A gaslit outdoor fountain at Grand Army Plaza (Brooklyn, New York, 1873–1897)

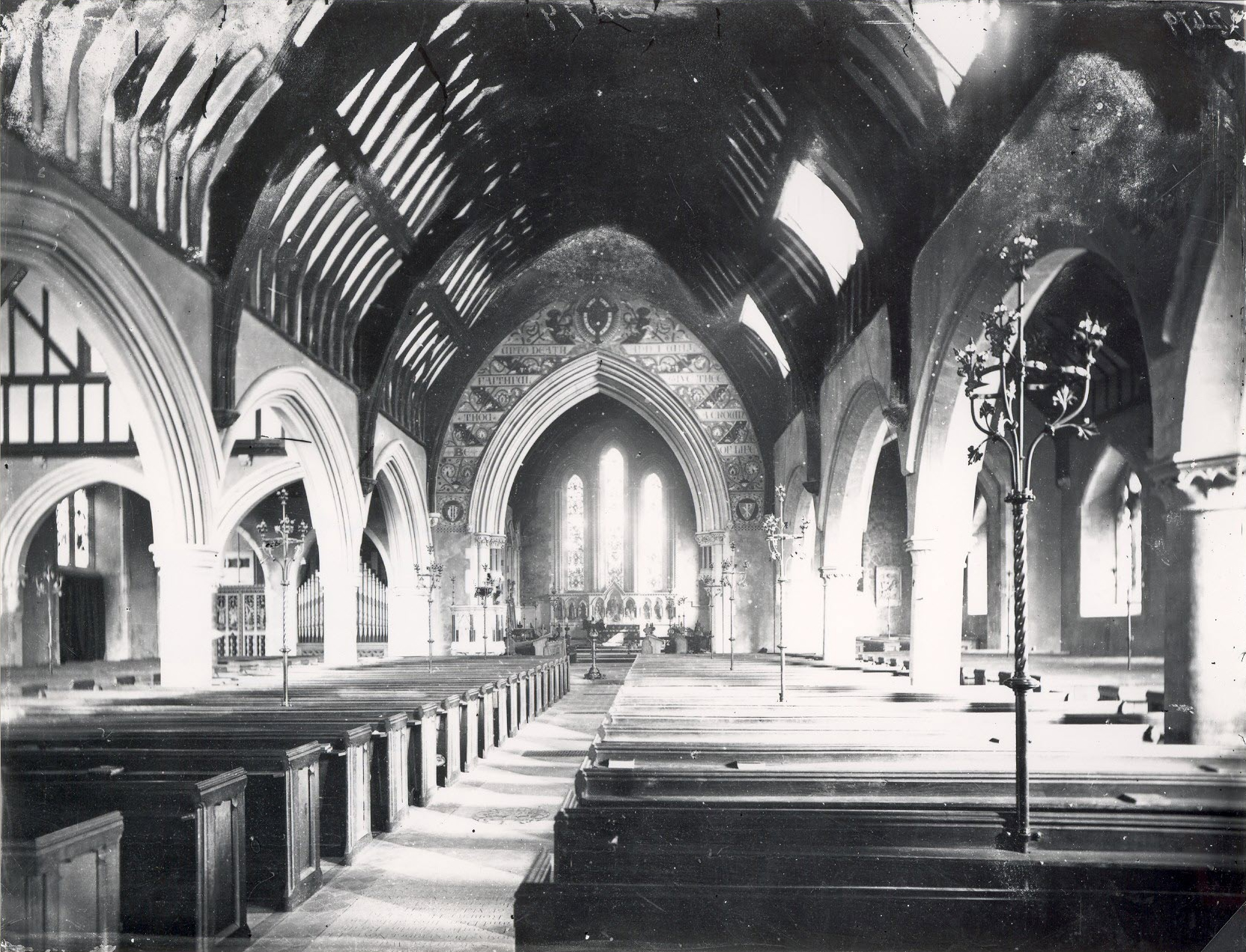
Church interior with gas torchieres (Reading, Berkshire, c. 1875)

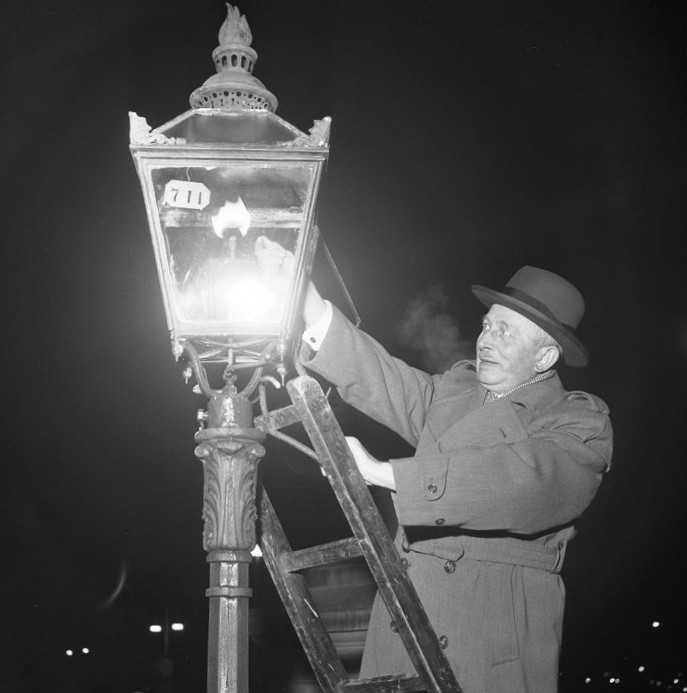
A lamplighter igniting a gas streetlight in Sweden, 1953

Among the economic impacts of gas lighting was much longer work hours in factories. This was particularly important in Great Britain during the winter months when nights are significantly longer. Factories could even work continuously over 24 hours, resulting in increased production. Following successful commercialization, gas lighting spread to other countries.

In England, the first place outside London to have gas lighting was Preston, Lancashire, in 1816; this was due to the Preston Gaslight Company run by revolutionary Joseph Dunn, who found the most improved way of brighter gas lighting. The parish church there was the first religious building to be lit by gas lighting.

In Bristol, a Gas Light Company was founded on 15 December 1815. Under the supervision of the engineer, John Brelliat, extensive works were conducted in 1816–17 to build a gasholder, mains and street lights. Many of the principal streets in the centre of the city, as well as nearby houses, had switched to gas lighting by the end of 1817.

In America, Seth Bemis lit his factory with gas illumination from 1812 to 1813. The use of gas lights in Rembrandt Peale's Museum in Baltimore in 1816 was a great success. Baltimore was the first American city with gas street lights; Peale's Gas Light Company of Baltimore on 7 February 1817 lit its first street lamp at Market and Lemon Streets (currently Baltimore and Holliday Streets). The first private residence in the US to be illuminated by gas has been variously identified as that of David Melville (c. 1806), as described above, or of William Henry, a coppersmith, at 200 Lombard Street, Philadelphia, Pennsylvania, in 1816.

In 1817, at the three stations of the Chartered Gas Company in London, 25 chaldrons (24 m^{3}) of coal were carbonized daily, producing 300,000 cubic feet (8,500 cubic metres) of gas. This supplied gas lamps equal to 75,000 Argand lamps each yielding the light of six candles. At the City Gas Works, in Dorset Street, Blackfriars, three chaldrons of coal were carbonized each day, providing the gas equivalent of 9,000 Argand lamps. So 28 chaldrons of coal were carbonized daily, and 84,000 lights supplied by those two companies only.

At this period the principal difficulty in gas manufacture was purification. Mr. D. Wilson, of Dublin, patented a method for purifying coal gas by means of the chemical action of ammoniacal gas. Another plan was devised by Reuben Phillips, of Exeter, who patented the purification of coal gas by the use of dry lime. G. Holworthy, in 1818, patented a method of purifying it by passing the gas, in a highly condensed state, through iron retorts heated to a dark red.

In 1820, Swedish inventor Johan Patrik Ljungström had developed a gas lighting with copper apparatuses and chandeliers of ink, brass and crystal, reportedly one of the first such public installations of gas lighting in the region, enhanced as a triumphal arch for the city gate for a royal visit of Charles XIV John of Sweden in 1820.

By 1823, numerous towns and cities throughout Britain were lit by gas. Gas light cost up to 75% less than oil lamps or candles, which helped to accelerate its development and deployment. By 1859, gas lighting was to be found all over Britain and about a thousand gas works had sprung up to meet the demand for the new fuel. The brighter lighting which gas provided allowed people to read more easily and for longer. This helped to stimulate literacy and learning, speeding up the second Industrial Revolution.

In 1824 the English Association for Gas Lighting on the Continent, a sizeable business producing gas for several cities in mainland Europe, including Berlin, was established, with Sir William Congreve, 2nd Baronet, as general manager.

The 1839 invention, the Bude-Light, provided a brighter and more economical lamp.

Oil-gas appeared in the field as a rival of coal gas. In 1815, John Taylor patented an apparatus for the decomposition of "oil" and other animal substances. Public attention was attracted to "oil-gas" by the display of the patent apparatus at Apothecary's Hall, by Taylor & Martineau.

In 1891 the gas mantle was invented by the Austrian chemist Carl Auer von Welsbach. This eliminated the need for special illuminating gas (a synthetic mixture of hydrogen and hydrocarbon gases produced by destructive distillation of bituminous coal or peat) to get bright shining flames. Acetylene was also used from about 1898 for gas lighting on a smaller scale.

Illuminating gas was used for gas lighting, as it produces a much brighter light than natural gas or water gas. Illuminating gas was much less toxic than other forms of coal gas, but less could be produced from a given quantity of coal. The experiments with distilling coal were described by John Clayton in 1684. George Dixon's pilot plant exploded in 1760, setting back the production of illuminating gas a few years. The first commercial application was in a Manchester cotton mill in 1806. In 1901, studies of the defoliant effect of leaking gas pipes led to the discovery that ethylene is a plant hormone.

Throughout the 19th century and into the first decades of the 20th, the gas was manufactured by the gasification of coal. Later in the 19th century, natural gas began to replace coal gas, first in the US, and then in other parts of the world. In the United Kingdom, coal gas was used until the early 1970s.

==== Russia ====
The history of the Russian gas industry began with retired Lieutenant Pyotr Sobolevsky (1782–1841), who improved Philippe le Bon's design for a "thermolamp" and presented it to Emperor Alexander I in 1811; in January 1812, Sobolevsky was instructed to draw up a plan for gas street-lighting for St. Petersburg. The French invasion of Russia delayed implementation, but St. Petersburg's Governor General Mikhail Miloradovich, who had seen the gas lighting of Vienna, Paris and other European cities, initiated experimental work on gas lighting for the capital, using British apparatus for obtaining gas from pit coal, and by the autumn of 1819, Russia's first gas street light was lit on one of the streets on Aptekarsky Island.

In February 1835, the Company for Gas Lighting St. Petersburg was founded. Towards the end of that year, a factory for the production of lighting gas was constructed near the Obvodny Canal, using pit coal shipped in overseas from Cardiff, and 204 gas lamps were lit ceremonially in St. Petersburg on 27 September 1839.

Over the next 10 years, their numbers almost quadrupled, to reach 800. By the middle of the 19th century, the central streets and buildings of the capital were illuminated: the Palace Square, Bolshaya and Malaya Morskaya streets, Nevsky and Tsarskoselsky Avenues, Passage Arcade, Noblemen's Assembly, the Technical Institute and Peter and Paul Fortress.

=== Theatrical use ===
Diagram showing a typical limelight installation

It took many years of development and testing before gas lighting for the stage was commercially available. Gas technology was then installed in just about every major theatre in the world. But gas lighting was short-lived because the electric light bulb soon followed.

In the 19th century, gas stage lighting went from a crude experiment to the most popular way of lighting theatrical stages. In 1804, Frederick Albert Winsor first demonstrated the way to use gas to light the stage in London at the Lyceum Theatre. Although the demonstration and all the lead research were being done in London, "in 1816 at the Chestnut Street Theatre in Philadelphia was the earliest gas lit theatre in world". In 1817 the Lyceum, Drury Lane, and Covent Garden theatres were all lit by gas. Gas was brought into the building by "miles of rubber tubing from outlets in the floor called 'water joints'" which "carried the gas to border-lights and wing lights". But before it was distributed, the gas came through a central distribution point called a "gas table", which varied the brightness by regulating the gas supply, and the gas table, which allowed control of separate parts of the stage. Thus it became the first stage 'switchboard'.

By the 1850s, gas lighting in theatres had spread practically all over the United States and Europe. Some of the largest installations of gas lighting were in large auditoriums, like the Théâtre du Chatelet, built in 1862. In 1875, the new Paris Opera was constructed. "Its lighting system contained more than twenty-eight miles [45 km] of gas piping, and its gas table had no fewer than eighty-eight stopcocks, which controlled nine hundred and sixty gas jets." The theatre that used the most gas lighting was Astley's Equestrian Amphitheatre in London. According to the Illustrated London News, "Everywhere white and gold meets the eye, and about 200,000 gas jets add to the glittering effect of the auditorium … such a blaze of light and splendour has scarcely ever been witnessed, even in dreams."

Theatres switched to gas lighting because it was more economical than using candles and also required less labour to operate. With gas lighting, theatres would no longer need to have people tending to candles during a performance, or having to light each candle individually. "It was easier to light a row of gas jets than a greater quantity of candles high in the air." Theatres also no longer needed to worry about wax dripping on the actors during a show.

Gas lighting also had an effect on the actors. As the stage was brighter, they could now use less make-up and their motions did not have to be as exaggerated. Half-lit stages had become fully lit stages. Production companies were so impressed with the new technology that one said, "This light is perfect for the stage. One can obtain gradation of brightness that is really magical."

The best result was the improved respect from the audience. There was no more shouting or riots. The light pushed the actors more up stage behind the proscenium, helping the audience concentrate more on the action that was taking place on stage rather than what was going on in the house. Management had more authority on what went on during the show because they could see. Gaslight was the leading cause of behaviour change in theatres. They were no longer places for mingling and orange selling, but places of respected entertainment.

==== Types of lighting instruments ====
Four burners were experimented with:

- The first burner used was the single-jet burner, which produced a small flame. The tip of the burner was made out of lead, which absorbed heat, causing the flame to be smaller in size. It was discovered that the flame would burn brighter if the metal was mixed with other components, such as porcelain.
- Flat burners were invented mainly to distribute gas and light evenly to the systems.
- The fishtail burner was similar to the flat burner, but it produced a brighter flame and conducted less heat.
- The last burner that was experimented with was the Welsbach burner. Around this time the Bunsen burner was in use along with some forms of electricity. The Welsbach was based on the idea of the Bunsen burner, still using gas. A cotton mesh with cerium and thorium was imbedded into the Welsbach. This source of light was named the gas mantle; it produced three times more light than the naked flame.

Several different instruments were used for stage lighting in the 19th century; these included footlights, border lights, groundrows, lengths, bunch lights, conical reflector floods, and limelight spots:

- Footlights caused the actors' costumes to catch fire if they got too close. These lights also caused bothersome heat that affected both audience members and actors. Again, the actors had to adapt to these changes. They started fireproofing their costumes and placing wire mesh in front of the footlights.
- Border lights, also known as striplights, were a row of lights that hung horizontally in the flies. Color was added later by dying cotton, wool, and silk cloth.
- Lengths were constructed the same way as border lights, but mounted vertically in the rear where the wings were.
- Bunch lights were a cluster of burners that sat on a vertical base that was fuelled directly from the gas line.
- The conical reflector can be related to the Fresnel lens used today. This adjustable box of light reflected a beam whose size could be altered by a barndoor.
- Limelight spots are similar to today's current spotlighting system. This instrument was used in scene shops, as well as the stage.

Gas lighting did have some disadvantages. "Several hundred theatres are said to have burned down in America and Europe between 1800 and the introduction of electricity in the late 1800s. The increased heat was objectionable, and the border lights and wing lights had to be lighted by a long stick with a flaming wad of cotton at the end. For many years, an attendant or gas boy moved along the long row of jets, lighting them individually while gas was escaping from the whole row. Both actors and audiences complained of the escaping gas, and explosions sometimes resulted from its accumulation."

These problems with gas lighting led to the rapid adoption of electric lighting. By 1881, the Savoy Theatre in London was using incandescent lighting. While electric lighting was introduced to theatre stages, the gas mantle was developed in 1885 for gas-lit theatres. "This was a beehive-shaped mesh of knitted thread impregnated with lime that, in miniature, converted the naked gas flame into in effect, a lime-light."

=== Decline ===
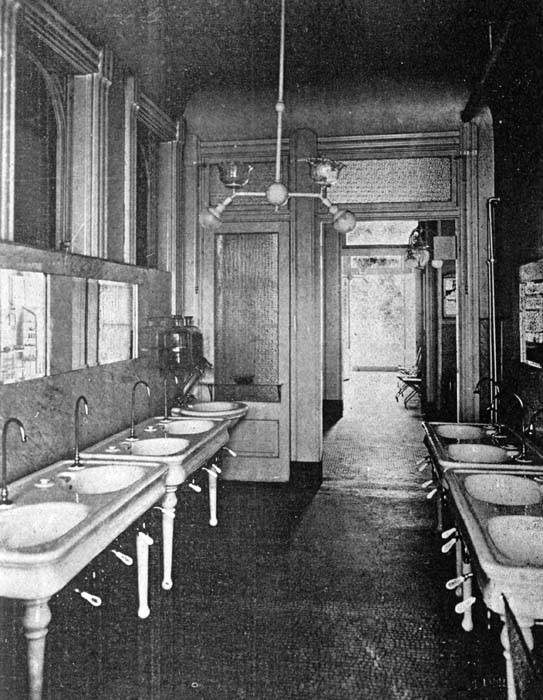
This hospital lavatory was lit by a dual gas and electric fixture. (New Orleans, 1906)

In the early 20th century, most cities in North America and Europe had gaslit streets, and most railway station platforms had gas lights too. However, around 1880 gas lighting for streets and train stations began giving way to high voltage (3,000–6,000 volt) direct current and alternating current arc lighting systems. This time period also saw the development of the first electric power utility designed for indoor use. The new system by inventor Thomas Edison was designed to function similar to gas lighting. For reasons of safety and simplicity it used direct current (DC) at a relatively low 110 volts to light incandescent light bulbs. Voltage in wires steadily declines as distance increases, and at this low voltage power plants needed to be within about 1 mile (1.6 km) of the lamps. This voltage drop problem made DC distribution relatively expensive and gas lighting retained widespread usage with new buildings sometimes constructed with dual systems of gas piping and electrical wiring connected to each room, to diversify the power sources for lighting.

The development of new alternating current power transmission systems in the 1880s and 1890s by companies such as Ganz and AEG in Europe and Westinghouse Electric and Thomson-Houston in the US solved the voltage and distance problem by using high transmission line voltages, and transformers to drop the voltage for distribution for indoor lighting. Alternating current technology overcame many of the limitations of direct current, enabling the rapid growth of reliable, low-cost electrical power networks which finally spelled the end of widespread usage of gas lighting.

== Modern usage ==
=== Outdoors ===
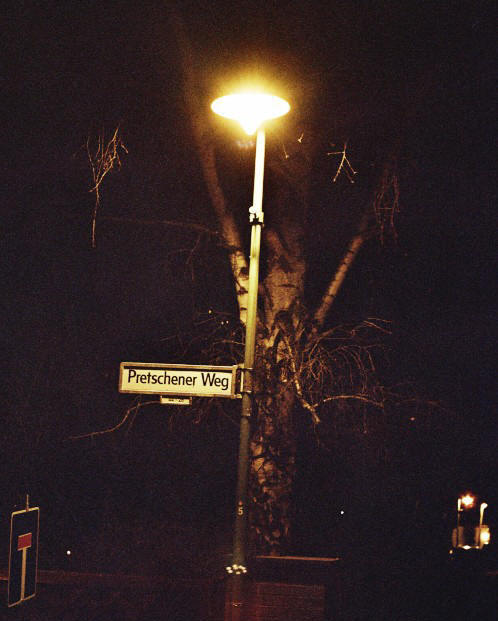
Modern gas street light in Berlin, Germany (2005)

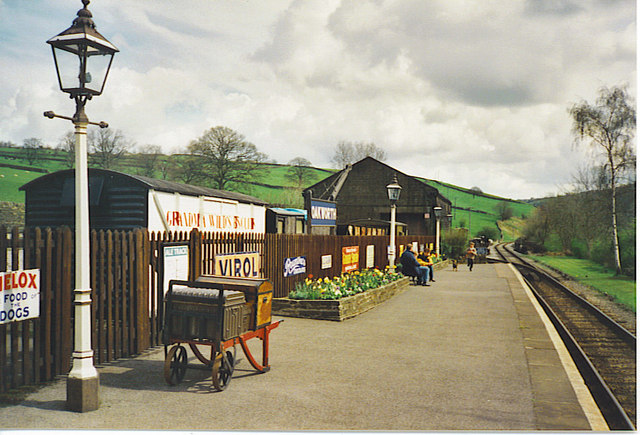
Gas lamp at Oakworth railway station in West Yorkshire, England

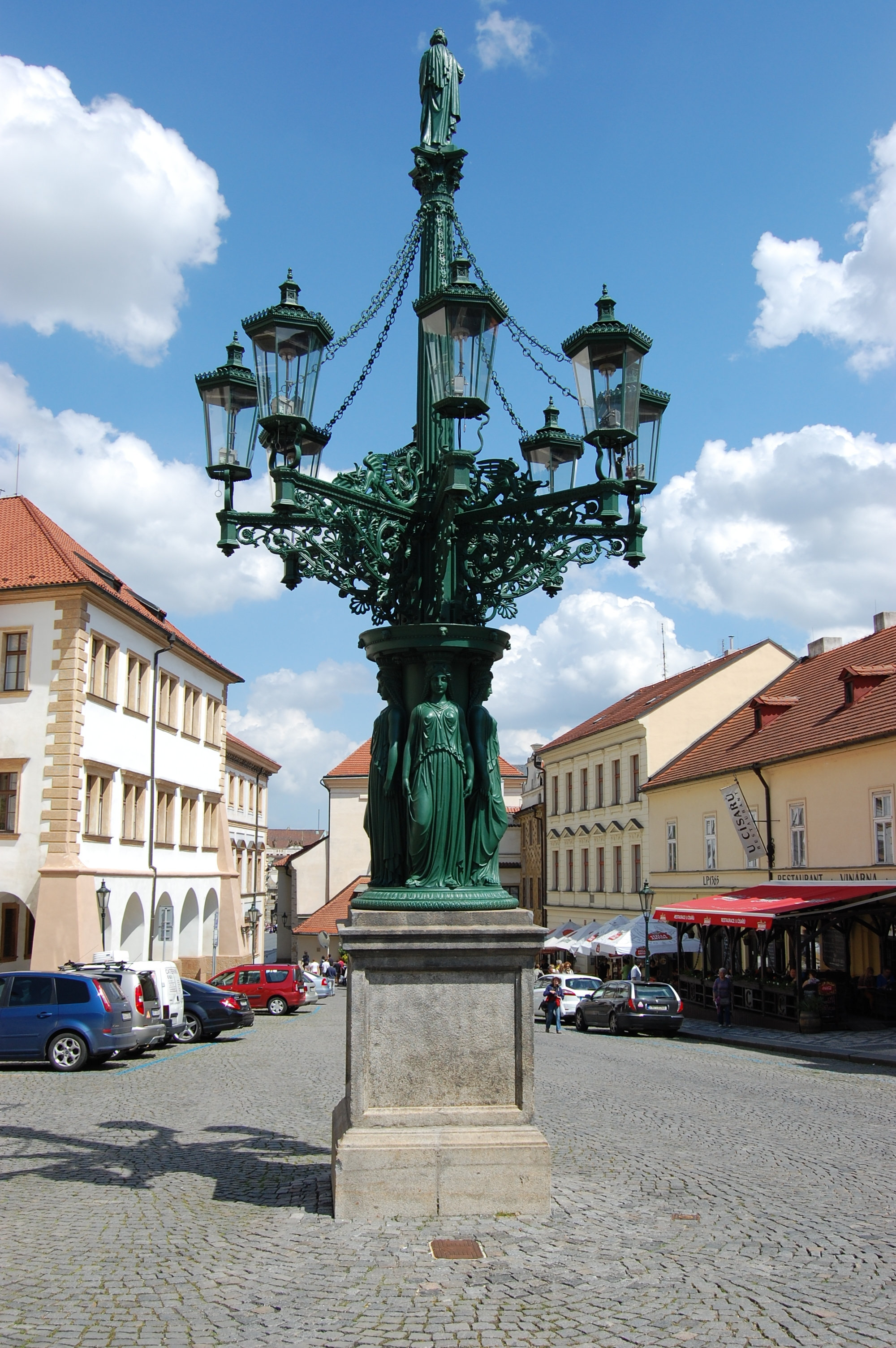
Historic candelabrum in Prague from 1865, electrified in 1985, rebuilt back to gas light in 2012

In some cities, gas lighting is preserved or restored as a vintage nostalgic feature to support the historic atmosphere of their historic centres.

In the 20th century, most cities with gas streetlights replaced them with new electric streetlights. For example, Baltimore, the first US city to install gas streetlights, removed nearly all of them. A sole, token gas lamp is located at N. Holliday Street and E. Baltimore Street as a monument to the first gas lamp in America, erected at that location.

Gas street lighting remains active in select cities, Where it is preserved for historical aesthetic value, it is also used for high-end residential properties.

The largest gas lighting network in the world is that of Berlin. With about 23,000 lamps (2022), it holds more than half of all working gas street lamps in the world, followed by Düsseldorf with 14,000 lamps (2020), of which at least 10,000 are to be retained.

In London there were about 1,500 working gas street lamps as of 2018, although there were plans to replace 299 of those in Westminster (the first city in the world lit by gas) with LED lighting by 2023, which sparked public opposition.

In the United States, more than 2800 gas lights in Boston operate in the historic districts of Beacon Hill, Back Bay, Bay Village, Charlestown, and parts of other neighbourhoods. In Cincinnati, Ohio, more than 1100 gas lights operate in areas that have been named historic districts. Gas lights also operate in parts of the famed French Quarter and outside historic homes throughout the city in New Orleans.

Zagreb, the capital of Croatia, has used gas candelabras since 1863. Initially, Zagreb was illuminated by 60,000 lamps, but as of 1987, only 248 gas street lamps illuminate old parts of the city. Zagreb gas lamps are manually managed by lamplighters.

Prague, where gas lighting was introduced on 15 September 1847, had about 10,000 gas streetlamps in the 1940s. The last historic gas candelabras become electrified in 1985. However, in 2002–2014, streetlamps along the Royal Route and some other streets in the centre were rebuilt to use gas (using replicas of the historic poles and lanterns), several historic candelabras (Hradčanské náměstí, Loretánská street, Dražického náměstí etc.) were also converted back to gas lamps, and five new gas lamps were installed in the Michle Gasworks as a promotion. In 2018, there were 417 points (about 650 lanterns) of street gas lighting in Prague. During Advent and Christmas, lanterns on the Charles Bridge are managed manually by a lamplighter in historic uniform. The plan to reintroduce gas lights in Old Prague was proposed in 2002, and adopted by the Municipality of Prague in January 2004.

=== Other uses ===
Perforated tubes bent into the shape of letters were used to form gas lit advertising signs, prior to the introduction of neon lights, as early as 1857 in Grand Rapids, Michigan. Gas lighting is still in common use for camping lights. Small portable gas lamps, connected to a portable gas cylinder, are a common item on camping trips. Mantle lamps powered by vaporized petrol, such as the Coleman lantern, are also available.

== Image gallery ==
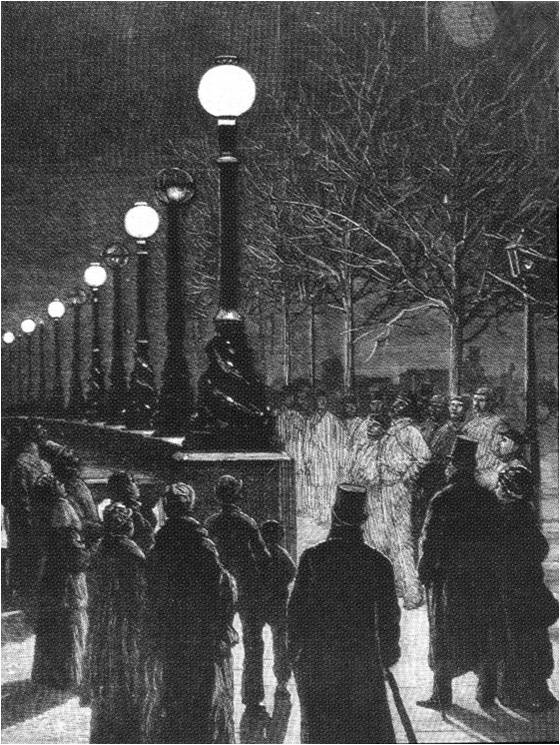
Outdoor installation of gaslamps compared with new electric lighting (London, 1878)

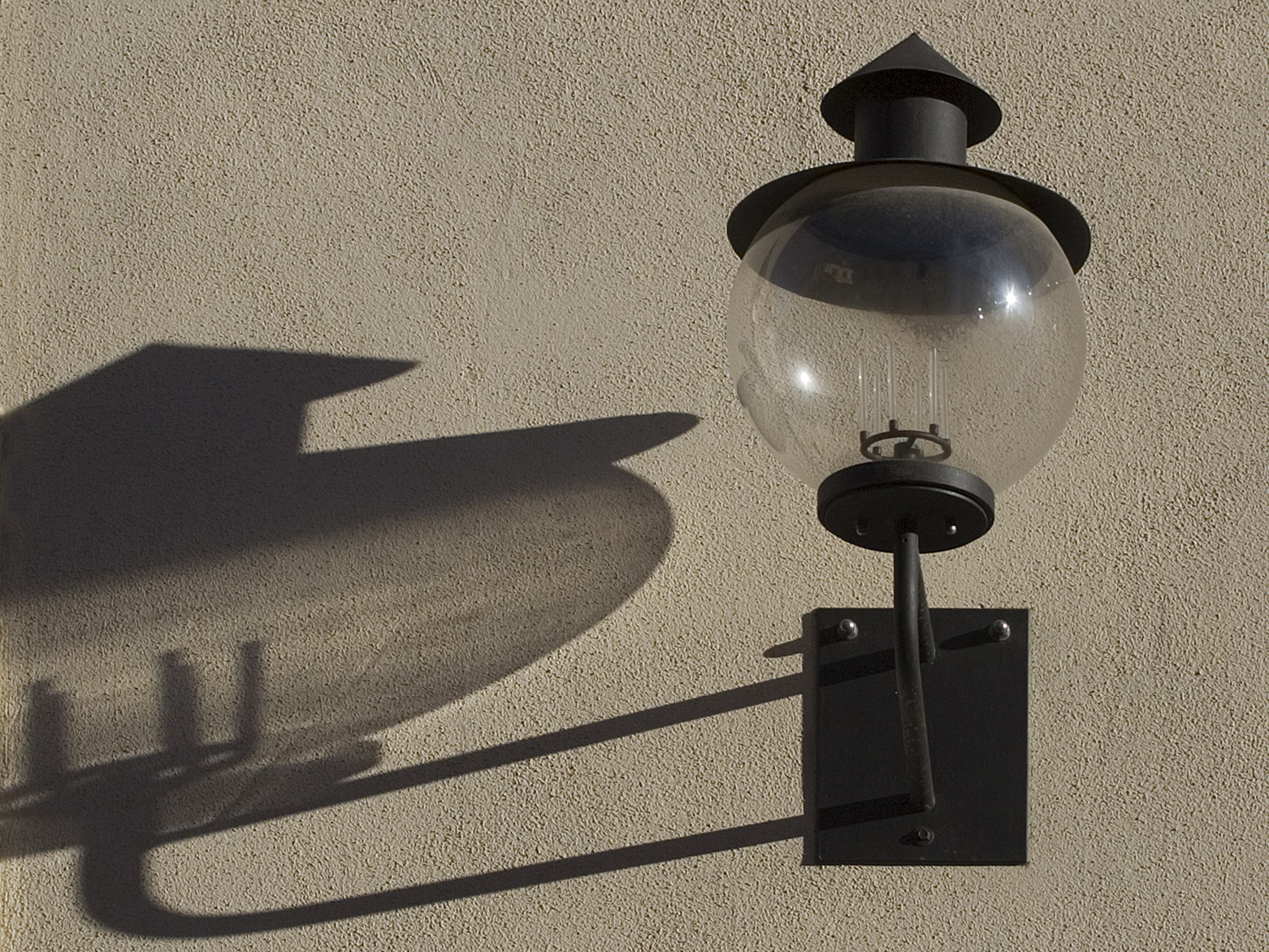
Reproduction of an early European exterior gaslamp (Germany)

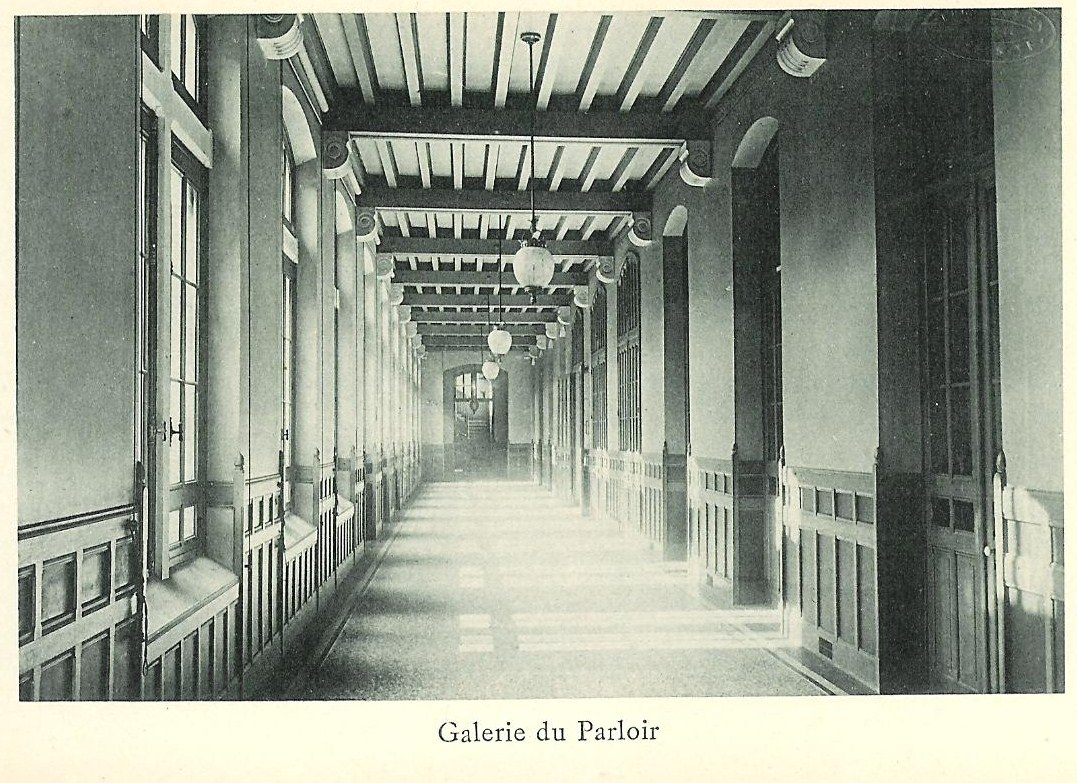
Gaslit school hallway (Paris, late 19th century)

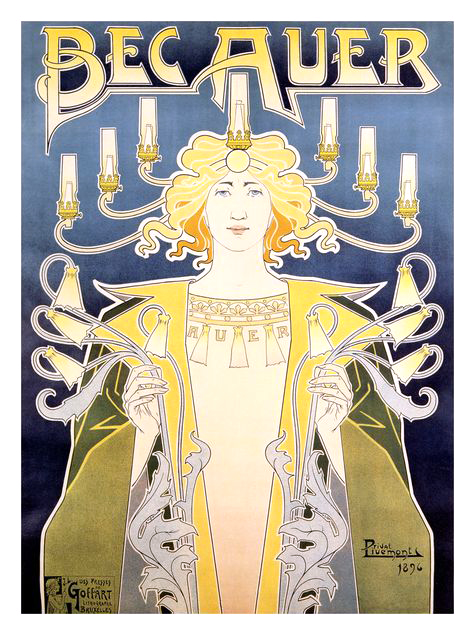
Poster advertising Bec Auer gaslamps (France, 1890s)

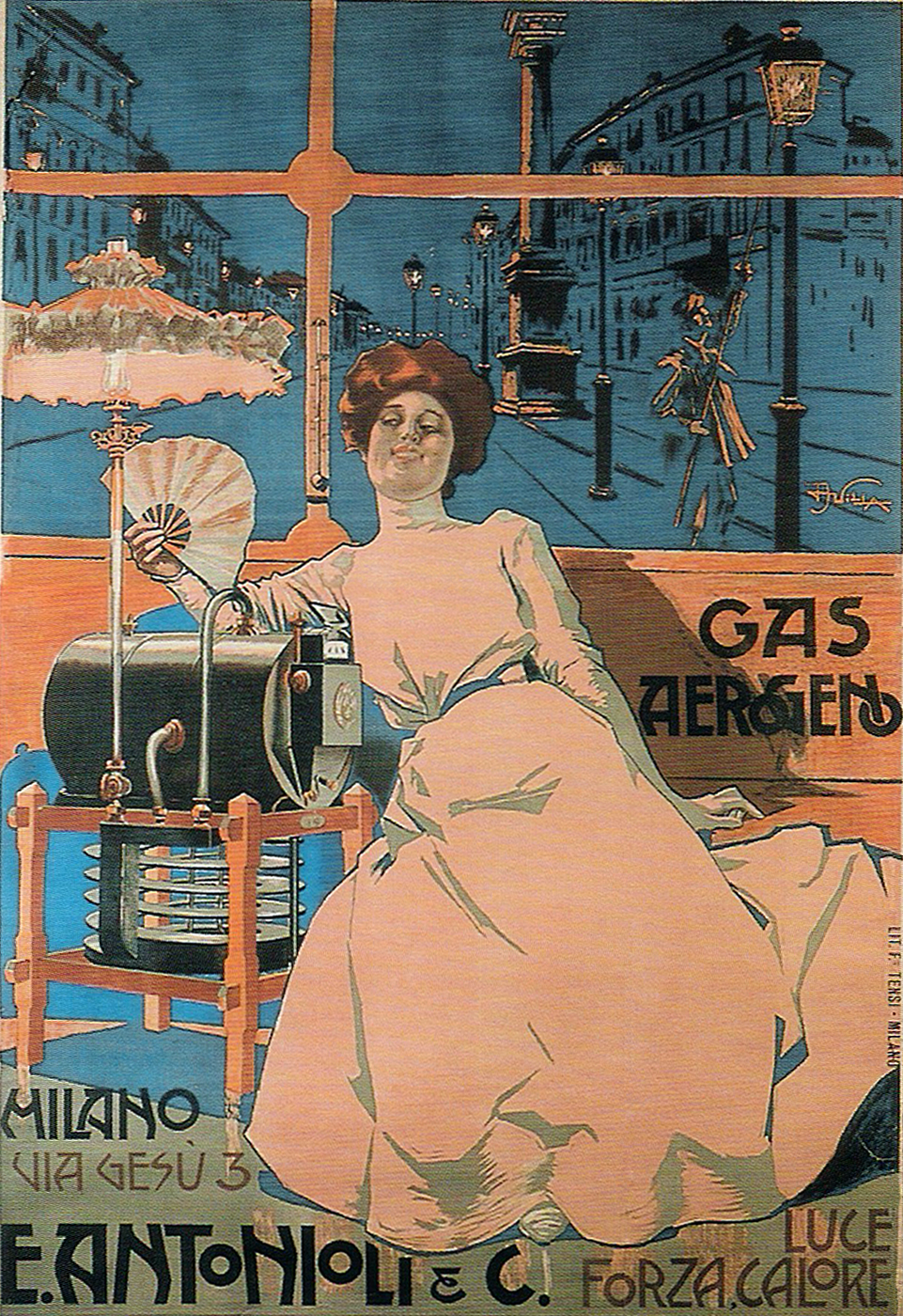
Poster showing benefits of gaslighting and heating (Italy, 1902)

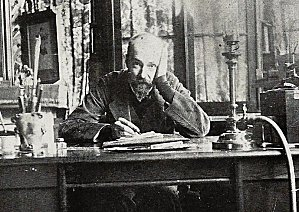
Portable gas desk lamp (c. 1900–1910)

== See also ==
- Blau gas – Artificial illuminating gas similar to propane
- Carbide lamp – Acetylene-burning lamps
- Carbochemistry – Branch of chemistry
- Gaslaternen-Freilichtmuseum Berlin – An outdoor gas lantern museum in Berlin
- History of manufactured fuel gases
- Limelight – Type of stage lighting once used in theatres and music halls
- List of light sources
- Sewer gas destructor lamp – Street lamp powered by burning sewer gas
- Thomas Thorp – English manufacturer of scientific instruments (1850–1914)
- Tilley lamp – Pressurized kerosene lamps made by the Tilley company in the UK
