= David Melville =

David Melville may refer to:

- David Melville (physicist) (born 1944), British physicist and former vice-chancellor of the University of Kent
- David Melville, 3rd Earl of Leven or David Leslie (1660–1728), Scottish aristocrat
- David Melville, 6th Earl of Leven or David Leslie (1722–1802), Scottish aristocrat and Freemason
- David Leslie-Melville, 8th Earl of Leven (1785–1860), Scottish peer and admiral
- David Melville (inventor) (1773–1856), American inventor
- David Melville, minister and candidate in the United States House of Representatives elections in Louisiana, 2010
- David Melville (priest) (1813–1904), British priest and academic
- David Melville (footballer), Scottish footballer
