= Sewer gas destructor lamp =

Street lamp powered by burning sewer gas

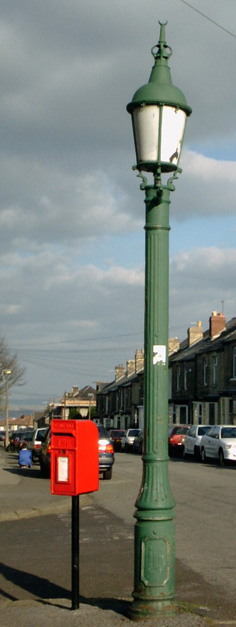
The lamp in the picture (taken in 2003) was still alight in the 1980s, but was extinguished by the end of the 20th century. It is situated at the corner of Stannington View Road and Mulehouse Road in Crookes, Sheffield, England

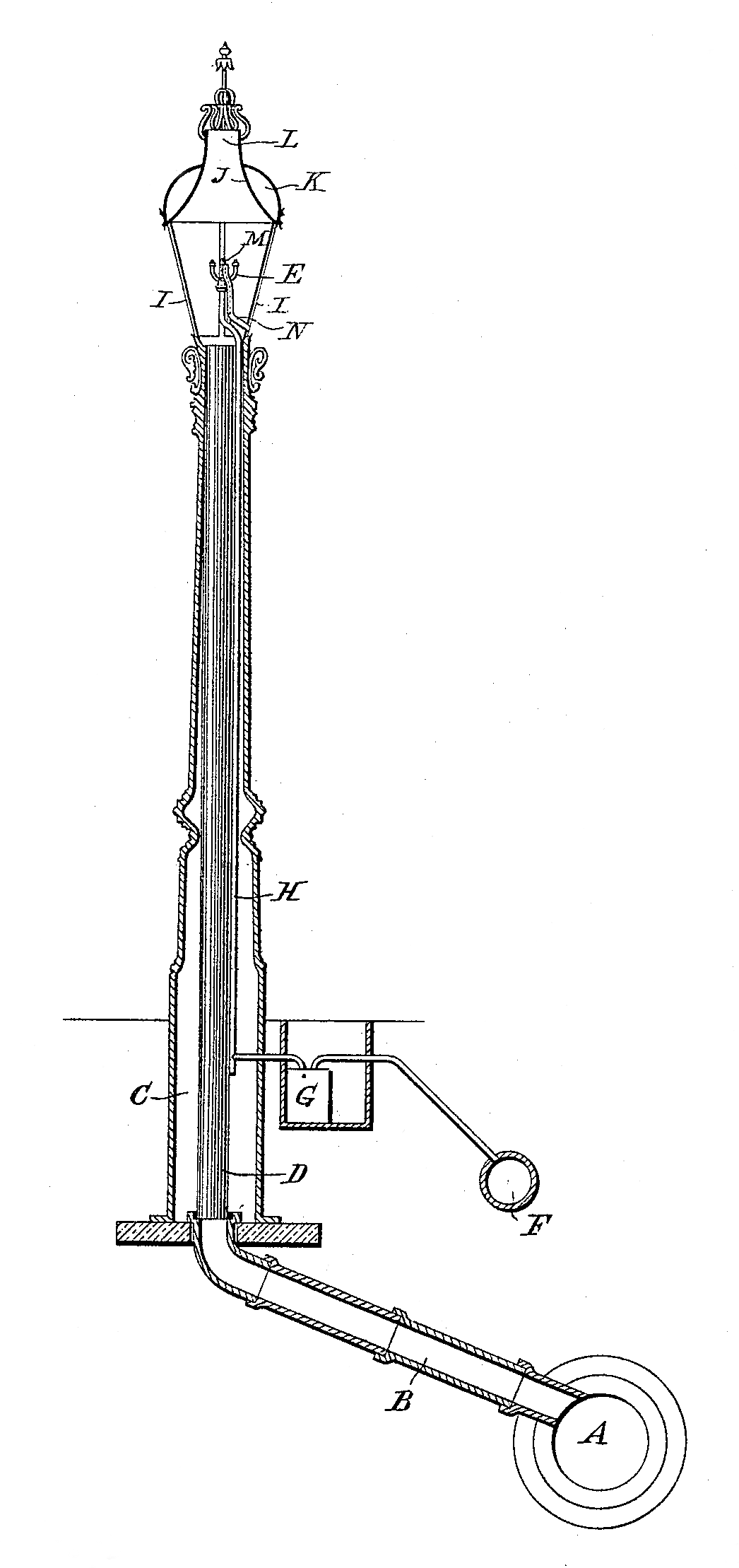
JE Webb's sewer gas destructor lamp patent illustration

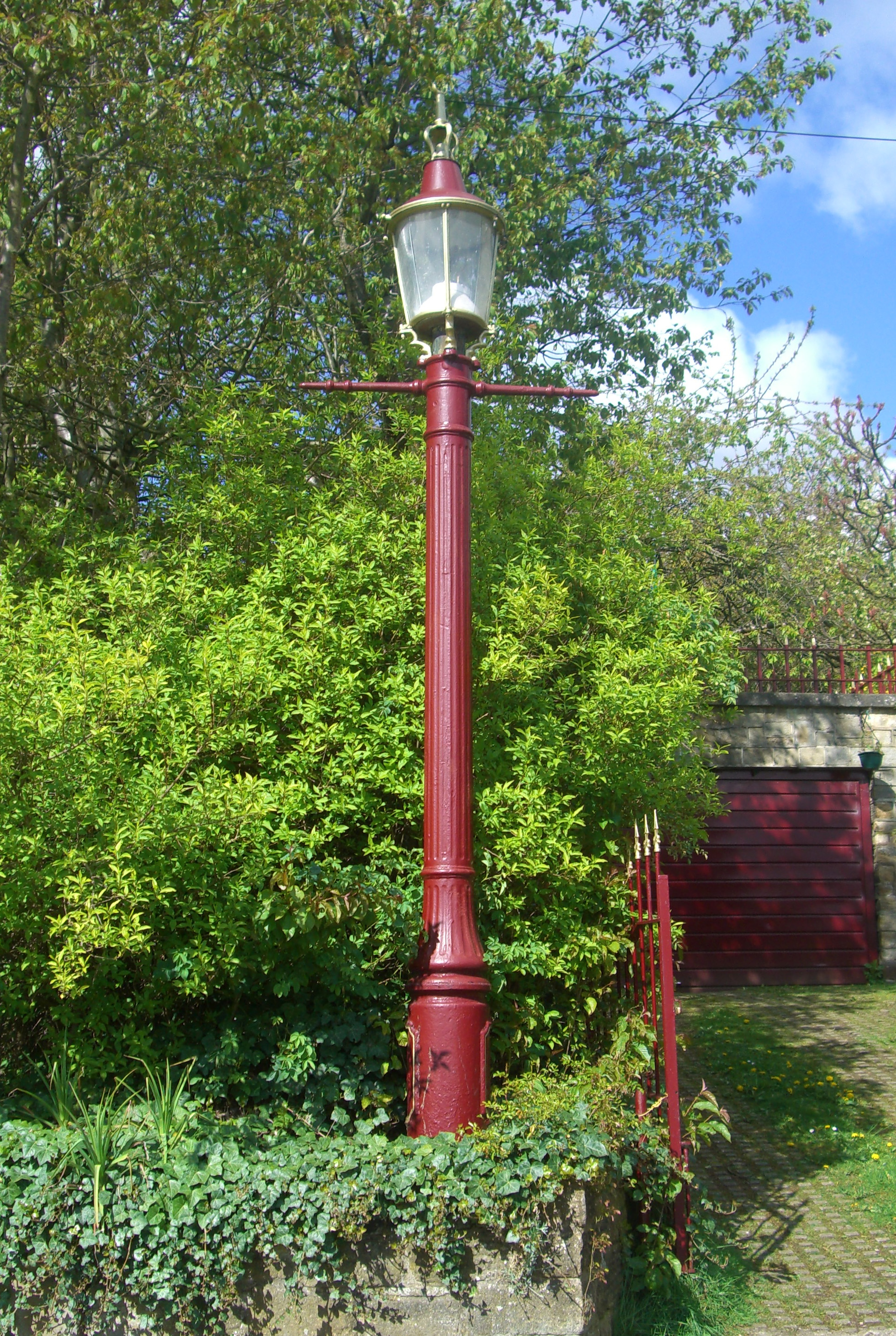
Another Sheffield example on Rural Lane at Wadsley.

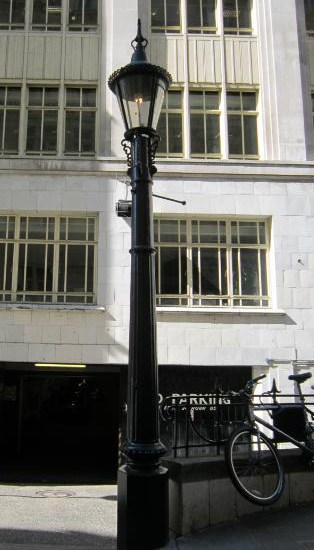
The only remaining lamp in London

A sewer gas destructor lamp is a type of lamp used to remove sewer gases and their hazards.

== Background ==
Biogas forming in sewers via anaerobic digestion can be a potentially foul-smelling and explosive hazard (chiefly due to chemical spills). Unlike ordinary gas lamps for street lighting, the main purpose of sewer gas destructor lamps is to remove sewer gases and their hazards.

Joseph Edmund Webb of Birmingham patented a sewer gas destructor lamp.

Many of these lamps were installed in the UK in towns and cities including Sheffield, Winchester, Durham, Whitley Bay, Monkseaton and Blyth, Northumberland. With a flame generated by burning town gas, sewer gases were drawn from the sewer below and discharged above the heads of passers-by to dissipate odours. The flame in the lamp does not actually generate sufficient thermal energy to combust any of the odour compounds in the air.

== Improvements ==
JE Webb addressed a number of problems with the lamps with further patents. It was originally patented in England on 14 June 1892 (No. 11,127) and later in the United States on 21 May 1895. It stated:

It has also been found that when the gases are drawn out from the sewer by the burning of ordinary gas a sudden flushing of the sewer might prevent any sewer gas from escaping, and thus momentarily cause the gas jets to be extinguished.

In order to solve this problem the patent specifies an arrangement of burners, air supply and heat reflection designed to produce an intense heat at the point of combustion–Webb suggests 600 to 800 °F (316 to 427 °C).

== Sheffield ==
The lamps were installed at places where sewer gases were likely to collect, such as at the tops of hills. The city of Sheffield, being a hilly area, had many sewer gas destructor lamps and many remain.

Sheffield on the Net has a section on the old gas lamps, which states:

Eighty-four of these street lamps were erected in Sheffield between 1914 and 1935, the largest number in any British town, due mainly to the many hills in the area where gas could be trapped.

The Sheffield Star newspaper reported a local survey of the lamps by W Jessop. This survey found 24 remaining lamps in Sheffield (there are actually 25), of which 20 are grade II listed. In 2016 Sheffield residents campaigned for the lamps to be restored when the city council's replacement of every lamppost began, as part of the 25-year Streets Ahead road improvement programme. Sheffield Council plans to repaint the lamps and convert them to solar power with LED lights to replicate the original lighting. Sheffield's four gas-powered lamps will remain so after their restoration. It is planned that the lamps will be restored by December 2017.

== London ==
Only one working sewer gas destructor lamp remains in London; however, due to a traffic accident, the original lamp was damaged and has been replaced with a replica. This lamp is currently in use and can be found burning day and night down the side street of the Savoy Hotel in London. The story of this lamp has given rise to locals referring to Carting Lane as 'Farting Lane'.

== Current justification of the lamps ==
Although many of the existing lamps in Sheffield and elsewhere are now disused, the lamps still have a use today in reducing odours. They do not prevent explosions as the concentration of methane in sewer gas is below the lower explosion limit (LEL) for methane. If the methane concentration were over the explosive limit (≈ 50,000 ppmv) the open flames in the lamps would burn like flares.
