= James Melville (cricketer, born 1936) =

English cricketer

Personal information
- Full name: James Edward Melville
- Born: 3 March 1936; Streatham, London, England
- Died: 2 June 2016 (aged 80); Hereford, Herefordshire, England
- Batting: Right-handed
- Bowling: Right-arm fast-medium

Domestic team information
- Years: Team
- 1962–1963: Kent
- FC debut: 28 July 1962 Kent v Sussex
- Last FC: 17 August 1963 Kent v Somerset

Career statistics
Competition	First-class
Matches	6
Runs scored	20
Batting average	5.00
100s/50s	0/0
Top score	6
Balls bowled	965
Wickets	14
Bowling average	30.14
5 wickets in innings	0
10 wickets in match	0
Best bowling	4/78
Catches/stumpings	4/–
- Source: Cricinfo, 4 February 2012

James Edward Melville (3 March 1936 – 2 June 2016), known as Jim Melville, was an English cricketer who played in six first-class cricket matches for Kent County Cricket Club in 1962 and 1963.

Melville was born at Streatham in London in 1936 and educated at Beaumont College where he played in the cricket team in 1952 and 1953. He played club cricket for Blackheath Cricket Club and, after a series of strong performances was asked to play for Kent's Second XI in 1960. He took figures of 9/94 for the Second XI against Sussex Second XI, figures which remain the best Second XI bowling figures for the county, and was in the Club Cricket Conference (CCC) team which defeated the touring Australians in 1961, the tourists' only defeat outside the Test series. Melville took six wickets in the one-day match at his club's home ground, Rectory Field, as the Australians were bowled out for 161 runs. In reply CCC scored the runs required with just one minute to spare.

He played again for the CCC against the Pakistanis in 1962 and was capped by the Conference. Following a number of injuries to bowlers, Melville was drafted into the Kent First XI later in the season. He played five times during the season, taking 13 wickets. He played one further first-class match in 1963 which was the last of his first-class career, although he continued playing for Blackheath and MCC in non-first-class matches. He was described in his Wisden obituary as "a lively seamer with a well-disguised slower ball".

Melville spent much of his time in his later life in South Africa. He died at Hereford in 2016 aged 80.
