= Carting Lane =

Street in London

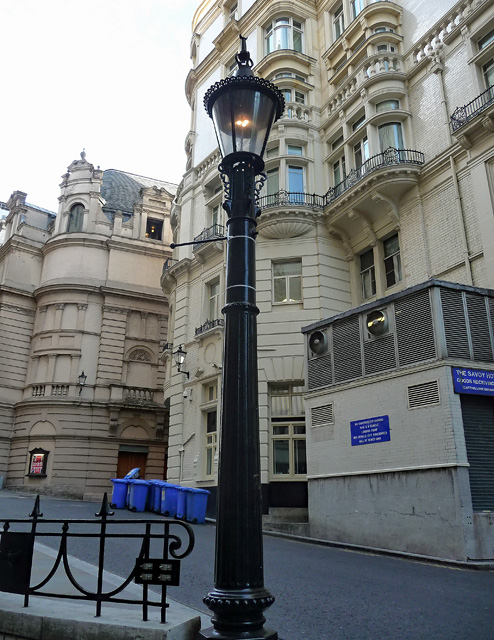
- The Carting Lane sewer gas lamp gave the street the nickname "Farting Lane".
- Interactive map of Carting Lane
- Coordinates: 51.509826°N 0.1207382°W

Carting Lane is a street in London leading from the Strand in the north to Savoy Place to the south.

== History ==
Originally, the street was an access road from the Strand to the River Thames, running between private plots. These plots once held large townhouses such as the nearby Salisbury House.

The street was known as Dirty Lane until around 1830 when its name was changed to Carting Line which it retains. The name likely makes reference to the carts which would have transported goods from Beaufort Wharfs at the Thames end of the street.

== Features ==
The street is flanked by the sides of large buildings with the Savoy Theatre and Savoy Hotel to the east and Eighty Strand to the west. At the northeast corner with the Strand is the Coal Hole, a historic pub, named for the coal-heavers working on the Thames who would frequent it.

=== Sewer gas lamp ===
Towards the southern end of the street is a sewer gas lamp, a design patented in 1895 by Joseph Edmund Webb. It is believed to be the last remaining of its kind in London and was Grade II listed in 1987 for its historical significance. The lamp's presence is said to have given the street the nickname "Farting Lane".
