= David Melville (inventor) =

American inventor

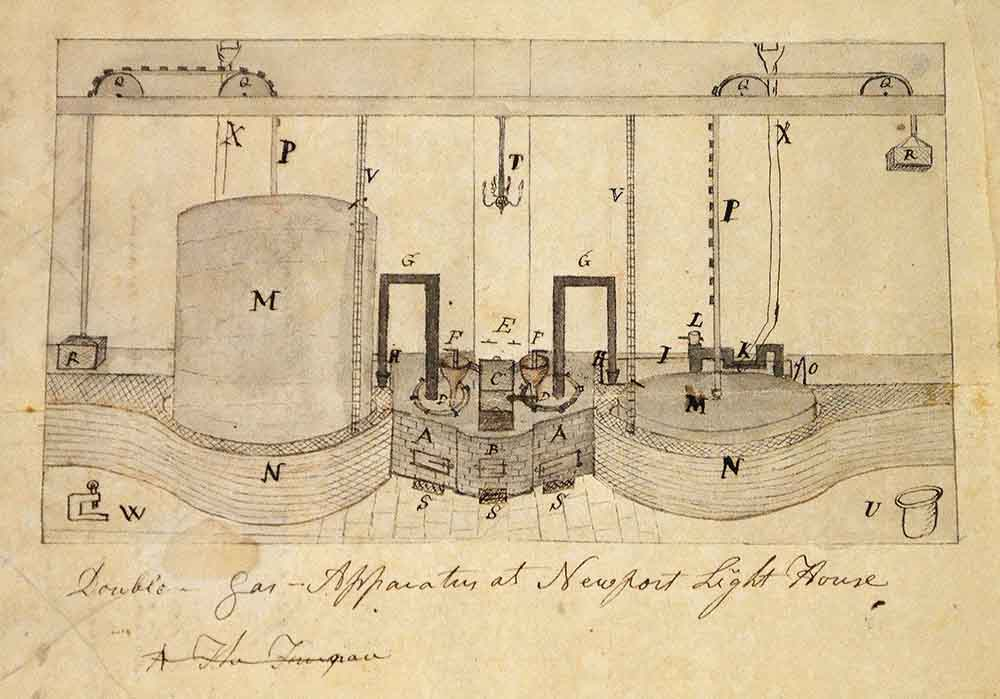
Diagram of Double gas apparatus at Newport Light House, from David Melville's 1817–1818 Meteorological Diary

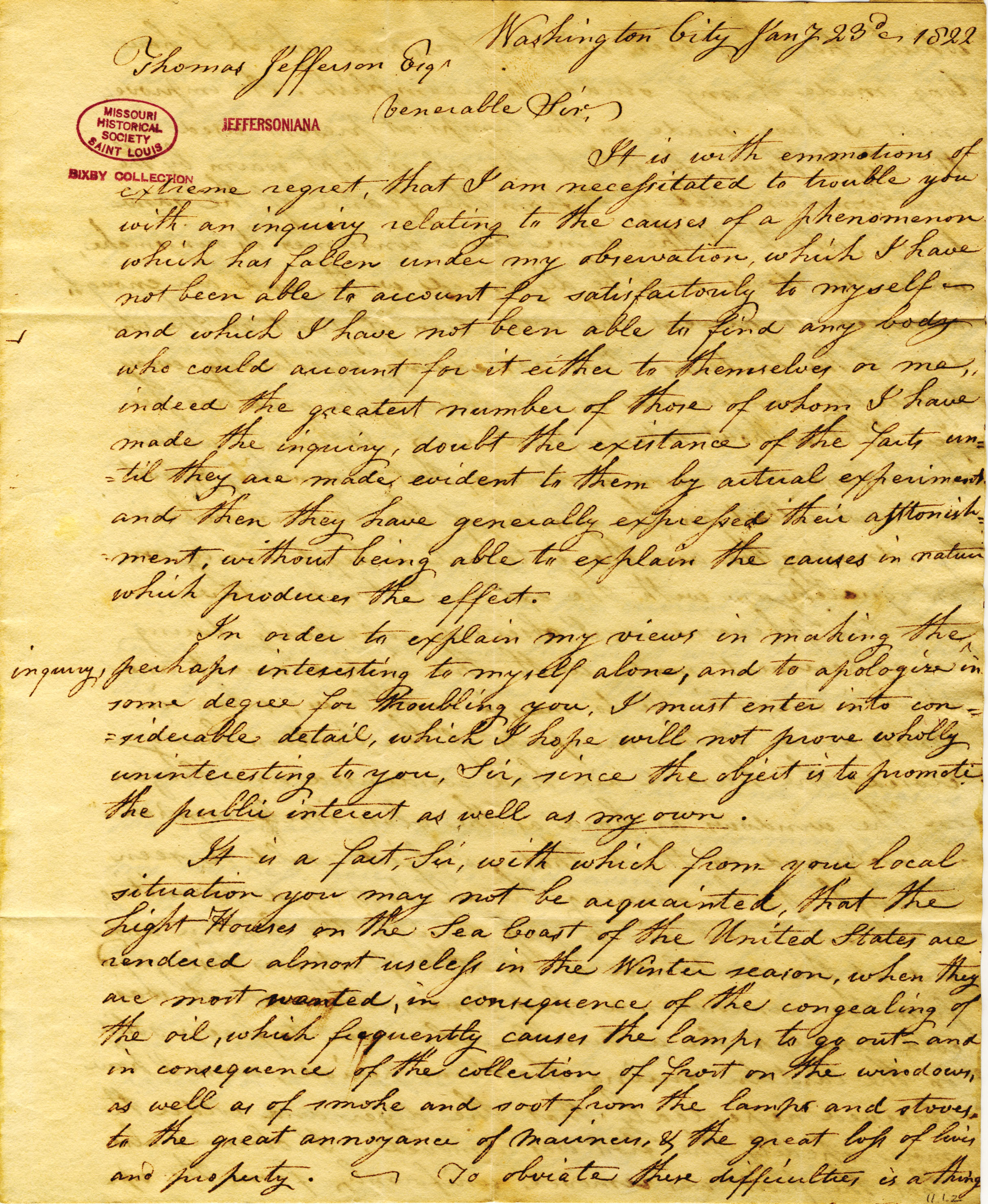
Letter from David Melville to Thomas Jefferson, Monticello, Virginia, January 23, 1822

David Melville (March 21, 1773 – September 3, 1856) was an American inventor, credited with the first gas street lighting in America, and the first American patent for gas lighting.

== Biography ==
Melville was born in Newport, Rhode Island to David and Mary (West) Melville. He was apparently able to light both his house and his street with gas by 1805–1806, using hydrogenous gas made by burning coal and wood. In 1876 the American Gas Light Journal stated that "in 1806 he had so far succeeded that he was enabled to light more than twenty rooms on his premises; by means of a large lantern he lighted Pelham street as it had never been lighted before." In 1916, Walton Clark stated:

The first recorded instance of the use of gas for domestic illumination in the United States fixes the date at 1806. In that year David Melville of Newport, R.I., lighted his house and the street in front it with gas manufactured upon his premises. This was one year before the first public gas lighting venture in England

He maintained the lights in his home until 1817. His feat was considerably ahead of the commercial gas industry, as gas lighting began regular service in Newport in 1853, nearly fifty years after Melville's demonstrations.

Melville was granted the first American gas light patent on March 24, 1810, and a subsequent patent on March 18, 1813, but neither is still extant as the U.S. Patent Office and all its records and models were destroyed by fire on December 15, 1836. (Like all U.S. patents before 1836, they were unnumbered.) A drawing and detailed description of Melville's Improved Gas Apparatus, presumably reflecting the 1813 patent, may be seen in an 1814 letter from Benjamin Silliman, Professor of Chemistry at Yale College, to David Melville, Patentee of the Improved Gas Apparatus, as recorded in The Journal of Foreign Medical Science and Literature. Likewise, both the diagram and text of the second patent are included in Thomas Cooper's book, published in 1816. This apparatus produced gas from coal. Its description states that about 40 pounds of coal would produce enough gas for three hours of lighting at a brightness equivalent to 50 candles.

Melville married Patience S. Sherman (1791–1880) on March 4, 1812, and had six children. Late in that year, he hired the brass founders Otis Chaffee and Joseph Lyon to make gas machinery and ornamental fixtures. After partnering with Captain Winslow Lewis, de facto "Superintendent for lighting the United States light houses," they began manufacturing gas equipment in Boston. By June 5, 1813, an advertisement indicated that gas lights had been installed at a cotton factory in Watertown, Massachusetts, apparently with Melville's equipment. On November 13, 1813, a second installation was completed in the Wenscott Manufacturing Co.'s factory near Providence, Rhode Island. A later installation, at the Arkwright Mill near Providence exploded, destroying a small out-building and killing the watchman.

In 1817, Melville received a one-year contract from the U.S. Government for a trial of gas in the Beavertail Lighthouse near Newport, but lobbying from whale oil suppliers killed the contract after one year. From 1824 to 1835, he served as weigher and gauger in the custom-house at Newport, but was removed from that office for political reasons by the new Collector of Customs, William Littlefield.

Ultimately, Melville's work was not a commercial success.
