= John Melville (lord provost) =

Scottish lawyer and landowner

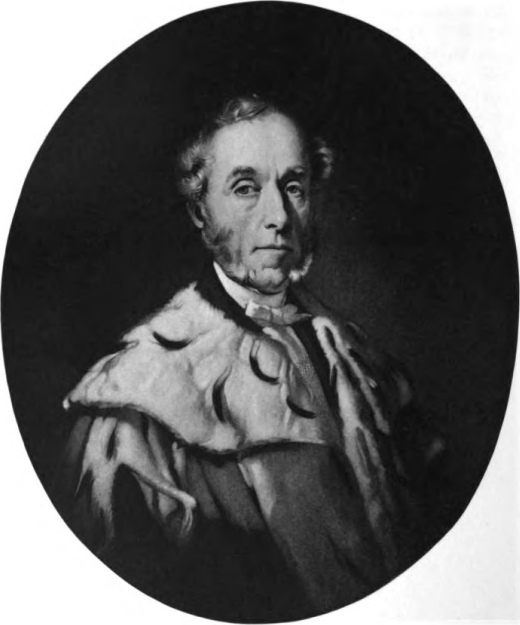
Sir John Melville, Lord Provost of Edinburgh

Sir John Melville FRSE WS (1802 – 5 May 1860) was a Scottish lawyer and landowner who served as Lord Provost of Edinburgh from 1854 to 1859.

== Life ==
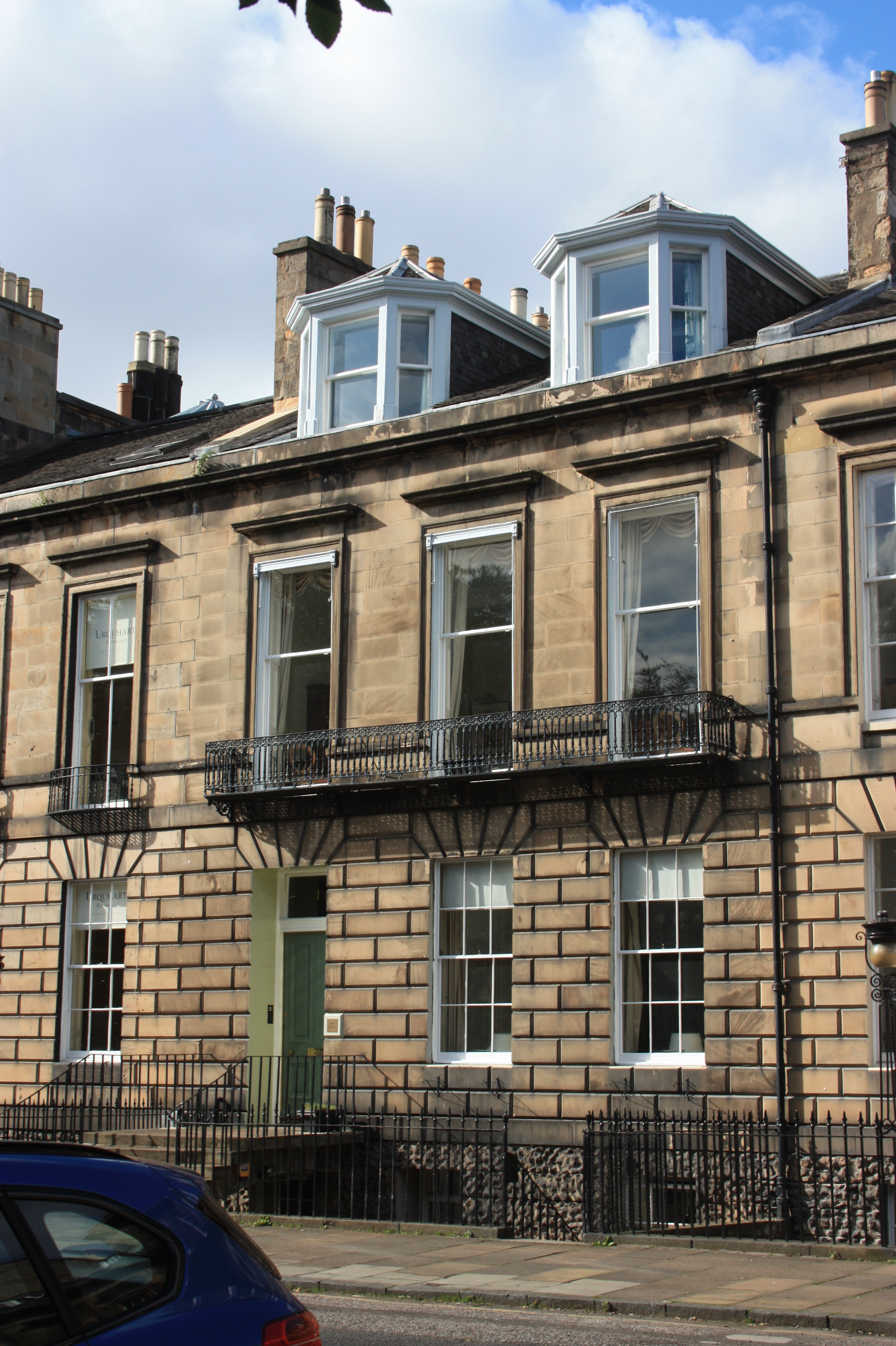
15 Heriot Row, Edinburgh

He was born in Kirkcaldy in Fife the son of Isabella Rule of Kennoway and her husband, George Melville, a lawyer. The family moved to Edinburgh in his youth. He studied law at the University of Edinburgh.

He was apprenticed to Alexander Manners WS based at 12 Nicolson Square. He qualified WS in 1827 and set up his own partnership, Melville & Lindesay WS.

In 1849 he was Chief Magistrate of Edinburgh. He was also created a town councillor in 1853.

In 1857 he was elected a Fellow of the Royal Society of Edinburgh.

Melville was knighted in 1859 by Queen Victoria at the end of his period as Lord Provost.

He died at home on 5 May 1860. He is buried in East Preston Street Cemetery Old Newington Cemetery, beside his parents, in the south of the city.

== Family ==
In 1838 he married Jane Marshall (1801 - 7 February 1873), sister of David Marshall, a prominent Edinburgh accountant. His son, George Fisher Melville (21 May 1841 - 12 July 1917), was an advocate.

== Legacy ==
His portrait by James Edgar was painted (in his official robes) in 1859. It is held by the City of Edinburgh Council, but is rarely displayed.

Melville Drive in Edinburgh is named after him.
