= James Melville (cricketer, born 1909) =

English cricketer

James Melville (15 March 1909 – 2 August 1961) was an English cricketer who played first-class cricket in two matches for Warwickshire in 1946. He was born in Barrow-in-Furness, then in Lancashire, now Cumbria, and died in Coventry.

Melville was a right-handed middle- or lower-order batsman and a slow left-arm orthodox spin bowler who played alongside good quality cricketers in matches for Coventry during the Second World War, and was brought into the somewhat-makeshift Warwickshire side for a couple of matches in 1946 at the age of 37. He had no success as a batsman, but bowling with Eric Hollies he took five Hampshire wickets in his debut match.
