= Robert Melville =

Robert Melville or Melvill may refer to:

- Robert Melvill or Melville (1723–1809), Scottish general, botanist and inventor
- Robert Melville, 1st Lord Melville (died 1621), Scottish lawyer and diplomat
- Robert Melville, 2nd Lord Melville (died 1635)
- Robert Melville (died 1693), burgh commissioner for Cupar (Parliament of Scotland constituency)
- Robert Melville (art critic) (1905–1986), British art critic and journalist
- Robert Melville (Australian politician) (1919–1982), Australian politician
- Robert Melville (car designer), former chief designer at McLaren Automotive
