= Paul Melville =

Personal information
- Full name: Paul Melville
- Born: 27 December 1956; South Shields, Durham, England
- Died: 21 November 1978 (aged 21); Vermont South, Victoria, Australia
- Batting: Right-handed
- Role: Batsman

Domestic team information
- Years: Team
- 1976/77–1978/79: Victoria

Career statistics
| Competition | First-class | List A |
|---|---|---|
| Matches | 11 | 2 |
| Runs scored | 511 | 46 |
| Batting average | 26.89 | 23.00 |
| 100s/50s | –/4 | –/– |
| Top score | 86 | 34 |
| Balls bowled | 8 | 40 |
| Wickets | 0 | – |
| Bowling average | – | – |
| 5 wickets in innings | – | – |
| 10 wickets in match | – | – |
| Best bowling | – | – |
| Catches/stumpings | 9/– | 1/– |
- Source: Cricinfo, 11 August 2014

Paul Melville (27 December 1956 – 21 November 1978) was an Australian cricketer. Melville was a right-handed batsman who played for the Victoria state cricket team. He died of brain hemorrhage in 1978.

Melville made his first-class debut for Victoria against South Australia in the 1976/77 Sheffield Shield. He made 10 further first-class appearances for Victoria, the last coming against the touring England XI in the 1978/79 summer. A hard-hitting batsman, Melville scored 511 runs at an average of 26.89. He made four half centuries, with a high score of 86, against Western Australia.

In 1978, Melville played for Rishton Cricket Club in the Lancashire League, scoring over 1000 runs, the second most runs in the league, only behind future Australian captain Allan Border. At the start of the 1978/79 season, he played twice for Victoria, before being dropped from the side. On 20 November 1978 he complained of a headache, and died from a brain haemorrhage the next day.

== See also ==
- List of Victoria first-class cricketers
