= Francis Melville =

Francis Melville may refer to:

- Francis Dawes Melville, member of the Bombay civil service
- Captain Melville (Francis McNeiss McNeil McCallum, died 1857), bushranger in Australia
