= Melville Mackenzie =

British physician and epidemiologist

Melville Douglas Mackenzie
- Melville Mackenzie in 1946
- Born: 29 June 1889; Huddersfield, England
- Died: 1 December 1972 (aged 83); Dover, England
- Known for: Role in creation of World Health Organization
- Awards: Companion of the Order of St.Michael and St. George (1947)
- Scientific career
- Fields: Physician epidemiologist

Melville Douglas Mackenzie CMG (29 June 1889 – 1 December 1972) was a British physician and epidemiologist who worked in the health section of the League of Nations and in many countries pioneering international health collaboration. After World War II, he had a prominent role in founding the World Health Organization (WHO), including the drafting of its constitution.

== Family ==
Mackenzie was born in Huddersfield to Emma Mackenzie née Beaumont and Frederick Lumsden Mackenzie, a University of Edinburgh medical graduate and general practitioner, in a family who were originally from St Andrews. In 1934 he married Caroline née Faith Mackay, daughter of Beatrice and Robert Mackay.

== Life ==
He was educated at Almondbury Grammar School, Huddersfield College School and Epsom College. He received his medical training at St Bartholomew's Hospital, London.

== Career ==
His first professional work after qualification in 1912 was in his father's practice in Huddersfield. In 1916 he was commissioned in the Royal Army Medical Corps and was appointed Captain and posted to Mesopotamia, where he developed expertise in the control of typhus fever After demobilisation, he returned in 1919 to general practice in Huddersfield.

Mackenzie left his practice in 1920 to seek further training, receiving a doctorate from the University of London with a thesis titled:The Prevention of Typhus and relapsing fever in Mesopotamia during the War. He obtained Diplomas in Tropical Medicine at the London School of Hygiene & Tropical Medicine and in Public Health at Durham University. In July 1921, he took the post of assistant medical officer at Newcastle upon Tyne, and later the same year, assistant port health officer at Liverpool.

Mackenzie then travelled to Russia in 1922 to organise relief work in the Russian famine of 1921-1922. He was recruited by Ruth Fry, director of the Russian Famine Relief Fund, sponsored by the Quakers. Working in the Buzuluk region of Russia, he organised feeding centres for distribution of supplies donated to the fund. He introduced measures for the control of infectious diseases, particularly typhus and malaria, and he introduced the practice of combining relief with the reconstruction of health services. Mackenzie returned to England as an invalid in 1923 suffering from simultaneous infections with Malaria and Typhus fever.

After convalescence, he visited Germany in 1924 with a paediatrician Helen Mackay, to investigate the health of German schoolchildren. In 1925 he moved to the British Ministry of Health as medical officer.

== International career ==
Mackenzie's career in international health started in 1928 when he was invited to join the health section of the League of Nations, under the direction of Ludwik Rajchman. In the same year he went to Greece to advise on the control of a severe epidemic of Dengue fever and returned the following year as Secretary of an International Commission to advise the Greek government to plan Hellenic health services. Later he also advised the government of Bulgaria on the control of endemic syphilis and the Czech and Romanian governments on the establishment of health centres. In 1930 he visited Spain to advise the government on Health Service Organization.

In April 1930, Mackenzie travelled to Bolivia with a Spanish epidemiologist, Marcelino Pascua, to develop plans to re-organise health services. Mackenzie and Pascua carried out, over three months, a comprehensive survey of economic, social and health issues, including malaria and other tropical diseases in the Jungle, and tuberculosis together with other diseases on the Andean plateau.

Mackenzie travelled to Liberia in 1931 with M. Brunot to investigate the prevalence and incidence of Infectious diseases. At the time Liberia was faced with many political problems, including a discontented repressed rural population and hostility between tribes over land and fishing rights. The following year he was designated by the Secretary General of the United Nations, Sir Eric Drummond, to return to Liberia to mediate in some of the areas of contention. He intervened in local conflicts to establish boundaries and fishing rights, and mediated between the rural population and the government. He also attempted, with partial success, to disarm the population. On a return visit in 1933 he was disappointed in the lack of follow up on his actions.

In 1934 Mackenzie reported and made recommendations on the health and hospital services in Ireland. In 1936 he was appointed director of the League of Nations epidemiological bureau in Singapore where he remained for one year. During the 2nd Sino-Japanese war Mackenzie flew to China in 1939 as special commissioner of the Secretary General of the League of Nations to co-ordinate technical cooperation and was present at the bombing of Chongqingc This experience of bombing raids and public health problems associated with air raid shelters was relevant in Mackenzie’a later wartime appointment as principal Medical Officer for London.

Mackenzie left the League of Nations in 1940 and returned to Britain to the post of principal medical officer for London, driving across France with his family from Geneva to London, just escaping being caught by the advancing Nazi occupation forces. In 1943 he was appointed British delegate to UNRRA and remained in this position until its 1947 dissolution. Mackenzie attended the first International Health Conference in New York in 1946. He was elected chairman of the central drafting committee, and signed the constitution of the World Health Organization on behalf of the United Kingdom as plenipotentiary representative of the British government. The following year he was also appointed representative of the British government to the World Health Assembly. He attended six subsequent plenary sessions of World Health Organization as the British delegate. In 1948 Mackenzie was elected chair of the UNICEF/WHO Joint Committee on Health Policy. He was chair of the WHO Executive Board in 1953 and 1954.

In his final working years he toured the Middle East three times on behalf of the UK Foreign Office to advise on medical service development. He also advised the Jamaican and Trinidad governments on control of a poliomyelitis epidemic in 1954. His final mission was to advise on public health measures following the 1960 Agadir earthquake.

== Death ==
Melville Mackenzie died on 1 December 1972, survived by his widow, two sons and a daughter.

Published obituaries of Melville Mackenzie referred to: “... a pioneer of international health...

“...a man of integrity, he devoted his life to the prevention of disease.”

A colleague wrote “He has left a legacy of greatness”.... (Letter to family)

== Awards ==
In 1947 Melville Mackenzie was appointed a companion of the Order of St Michael and St. George.

== Bibliography ==
Personal papers and records of Dr. Melville Mackenzie, (PP / MDM) held in the Wellcome Library Western Manuscripts and Archives, Wellcome Library and in Library of SOAS, University of London. This archive in the Wellcome Library includes 240 letters written to his family by Melville Mackenzie.

David Macfadyen (2014) The Genealogy of WHO and UNICEF and the Intersecting Careers of Melville Mackenzie (1889–1972) and Ludwik Rajchman (1881–1965) MD thesis University of Glasgow.

Sprigings, Zoe (2008) in: Dr. Melville Mackenzie. Feed the People and Prevent Disease and be Damned to their Politics. Ed. Borowy and Hardy. Publ. Langer, Frankfurt 2008 ISSBN 978 – 3 631 – 58044 – 8.

League of Nations Health Organisation (LHNO) Archives in Geneva.

World Health Organization (WHO) Archives in Geneva.

== Additional reading ==
Balinska, Marta A. (1998). For the Good of Humanity : Ludwik Rajchman, Medical Statesman (Translated by Rebecca Howell). Budapest: Central European University Press. ISBN 978-9639116177.
