= Crest =

Crest or CREST may refer to:

== Buildings ==
- The Crest (Huntington, New York), a historic house in Suffolk County, New York
- "The Crest", an alternate name for 63 Wall Street, in Manhattan, New York
- Crest Castle (Château Du Crest), Jussy, Switzerland
- Crest House, a building, now in ruins, at the summit of Mount Evans in Colorado
- Crest Theatre, a historic theatre in downtown Sacramento, California
- Nimoy Theater, formerly Majestic Crest Theatre, Los Angeles, California
- Crest Theatre, in Old School Square, Delray Beach, Florida

== Business or commerce ==
- Crest (toothpaste), a brand of toothpaste
- Crest Audio, an American manufacturer of power amplifiers and mixing consoles
- Crest Animation Productions, an animation studio in Burbank, California
- Crest Animation Studios, an animation studio in India
- Crest Books, an imprint of now defunct Fawcett Publications
- Crest Hotels, a defunct hotel chain in the UK
- Crest Manufacturing Company, producer of the Crestmobile in the 1900s
- Certificateless Registry for Electronic Share Transfer (CREST), the platform operated by Euroclear UK & International, a British central securities depository
- Center for Research in Economics and Statistics, Paris, France

== Education ==
- Crest Boys' Academy, a former secondary school in Neasden in the London Borough of Brent
- Crest Girls' Academy, a former secondary school in Neasden
- Crest High School (Kansas), Colony, Kansas
- Crest High School (North Carolina), Boiling Springs, North Carolina
- E-ACT Crest Academy, a secondary school which replaced Crest Boys' and Girls' Academies and Crest Sixth Form in 2014
- Centre for Renewable Energy Systems Technology, Loughborough University, UK
- GuildHE Research, formerly Consortium for Research Excellence, Support and Training (CREST), an organisation that provides training and research support for UK universities

== Music ==
- The Crest (band), a gothic metal band from Oslo, Norway
- The Crests, a late 1950s R&B doo wop band whose big hit was "16 Candles"
- Crest Records, an American record label from 1954 to 1963
- Crest (album), a 2022 album by Bladee and Ecco2K
- The Crest (album), a 2010 album by Axel Rudi Pell

== Places ==
- Crest, California, an unincorporated community, United States
- Crest, Drôme, a commune in the Drôme département, France
- Crest, Georgia, an unincorporated community, United States
- Crest, Missouri, an unincorporated community, United States
- Crest Mountain, British Columbia, Canada
- Le Crest, a commune in the Puy-de-Dôme département, France
- The Crest (Antarctica), a summit near Hope Bay on the Antarctic Peninsula

== Science and medicine ==
- Crest (anatomy), various anatomical features
- Crest (feathers), a prominent feature exhibited by several bird and other dinosaur species on their heads
- Crest (hydrology), the highest level above a certain datum or reference point that a river will reach in a certain amount of time
- Crest and trough, the section of a wave that rises above an undisturbed position
- Crest factor, a dimensionless number quantifying the shapes of waves
- CREST syndrome, a limited form of the disease scleroderma
- Ridge or Mountain crest, a geological feature
- Cosmic Ray Electron Synchrotron Telescope, a balloon-borne telescope

== Ships ==
- Crest (1900 steamboat), which operated in Puget Sound on the west coast of the United States
- USS Crest (SP-339), a US Navy minesweeper from 1917 to 1919

== Symbols ==
- Crest (heraldry), a component of a heraldic display
- Club crest, a common word for the logo used by a sports club
- Crest or 'unit crest' (army) a common word for a Distinctive unit insignia

== Other uses ==
- Crest (video game), an indirect god game by Eat Create Sleep
- Norm Grier Field, formerly Crest Airpark, a public airport in the state of Washington
- Crests (Digimon), powerful artifacts in the Digimon Adventure anime series
- Jacques-Barthélemy Micheli du Crest (1690–1766), Genevan military engineer, physicist and cartographer

== See also ==
- Crested (duck breed), a breed of domestic duck
- Cresting (architecture), ornamentation attached to the ridge of a roof, cornice, coping or parapet
- Fasciation or cresting, in botany, abnormal growth of a plant
