= Scott Davidson (legal scholar) =

British legal scholar and administrator

John Scott Davidson (born 24 September 1954) is a British legal scholar and academic administrator. He has served as vice-chancellor of Newman University Birmingham since 1 January 2017.

== Early life and education ==
Davidson was born on 24 September 1954, in Newcastle upon Tyne. His early education took place at George Stephenson County Grammar School in Westmoor, which was later renamed George Stephenson High School and relocated to Killingworth. Davidson went on to study law at Downing College, Cambridge. He graduated in 1977 with a Bachelor of Arts (BA) degree, later converted into a MA (Cantab) in 1979, as is tradition at Cambridge. The University of Canterbury, New Zealand, conferred upon him the degree of Doctor of Laws (LLD) in 2009.

== Career ==
Davidson began his academic career as a lecturer in law at the University of Hull in 1979. From 1982 to 1989 he served concurrently as Warden of Needler Hall (University of Hull). In 1998, Davidson was appointed senior lecturer in law at the University of Canterbury, New Zealand, becoming associate professor in 1995. From 2001 to 2003 Davidson held the posts of professor of law, head of the law school and warden of Morgan Hall concurrently at the University of Hull. He returned to New Zealand in 2003 as dean of the law school at the University of Waikato and then moved to the University of Canterbury in 2004 to become pro-vice-chancellor. In 2009, Davidson was appointed pro-vice-chancellor and then in 2010 deputy vice-chancellor at the University of Lincoln in the UK. In January 2017, he was appointed as vice-chancellor of Birmingham Newman University.

== Other positions ==
Davidson has held a number of positions, including: chair of Lincolnshire Educational Trust (2012–2016); chair of University Academy Holbeach Governing Body (2012–2016); member of governing body, Holbeach Primary Academy (2014–2016); Member of board of corporation, member of audit committee, vice-chair of standards committee, Lincoln College (2012–2013); chair of council, Cambridge Access Validating Agency (CAVA), chair of CAVA remuneration committee (2011–2016), former chair and member of CAVA executive board (2011–2016); member of University of Lincoln Students’ Union Trust Board (2011–present); board member of Lincoln Business Improvement Group (2009–2012); board member, AimHigher Board for Lincolnshire and Rutland (2009–2011); trustee of Lincoln Citizens Advice Bureau (2013–2016); board member of the New Zealand Qualifications Authority (2007–2009); board member of New Zealand Council of Legal Education (2004–2009); New Zealand representative Maritime Cooperation Working Group of the Council for Security and Cooperation in Asia Pacific (CSCAP) (1996–2001). He has served on the editorial board of the International Journal of Marine and Coastal Law, the New Zealand Yearbook of International Law, and the New Zealand Journal of Public and International Law.

== Selected works ==
Publications he has co-authored in the broad field of public international law, particularly human rights and the law of the sea.

- Defining Civil and Political Rights: The Jurisprudence of the United Nations Human Rights Committee (2004, Ashgate);
- Contemporary Issues in International Law: A Collection of the Josephine Onoh Memorial Lectures (2002, Kluwer);
- Legal Research and Writing in New Zealand (2000, Butterworths, 1st edition) - (2004, 2nd and 3rd editions);
- New Zealand Handbook on International Human Rights (1998, Ministry of Foreign Affairs);
- The Inter-American Human Rights System (1997, Open University Press)

He has published over 60 articles and notes on various topics and was a book reviewer for the Christchurch Press from 1995 to 2010.
