= Needler Hall =

- Interactive map of the Needler Hall area

General information
- Type: Hall of residence
- Location: Northgate, Cottingham, East Riding of Yorkshire, England
- Coordinates: 53.784495°N 0.414845°W
- Completed: 18th century (as private house)
- Owner: University of Hull

Needler Hall was a hall of residence of the University of Hull, located on Northgate in Cottingham, East Riding of Yorkshire, England. Originally a large private house built in the 18th century, it was acquired, along with Thwaite Hall, by the newly established university college in 1928. It was named in honour of Frederick Needler, of Needler's (a Hull-based sweets manufacturer), who was a major benefactor of the university college.

== History and description ==
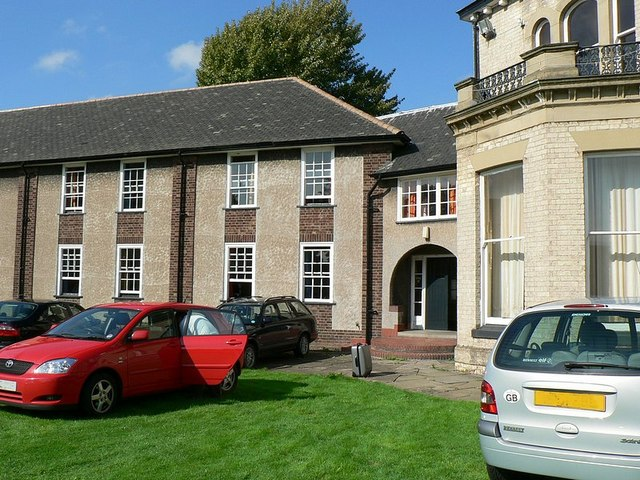
Needler Hall, to the right part of the original house can be seen, to the left is the wing constructed c. 1933.

The oldest part of Needler Hall was formerly known as Northfields House and was built soon after 1780, it was extended with the construction of a south-facing wing around 1820. The house served as a private asylum for the insane in the early nineteenth century. It was a stuccoed building, decorated with pilasters and wreathes, and it had a Tuscan porch. This columned south-facing porch was demolished in the early 1980s after becoming structurally unsafe. Soon after being acquired by the then university college a two-storey range of student accommodation, later known as the "Old Wing," was constructed running south-westward from the original building. Constructed in brick and rendered brick, it had a pitched slate roof. Following this extension the hall could accommodate 60 students. In 1962–64 the architect Trevor Dannatt RA added a new range of accommodation plus a refectory and kitchens to the residence. Known as the "New Wing," it was not physically connected to the earlier buildings; it was largely of brick construction with flat roofs, and the windows were sunk in vertical channels with concrete sills and lintels. The original house was for most of its life stuccoed and painted white, however, it was hacked back to bare brick and stone in some places, or rendered in others, in the 1990s.

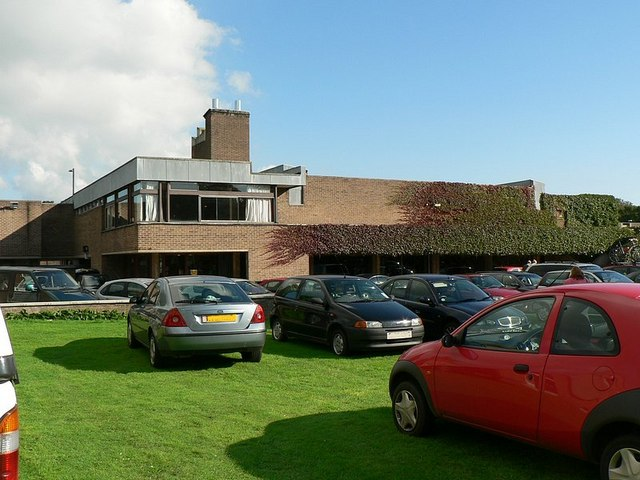
Needler Hall, the refectory, part of the wing built 1962–64.

When created as a hall of residence, and for many years following, Needler Hall was a male-only residence, in the 1950s female visitors were only permitted between 4 and 9 pm at weekends. In 1984, under the wardenship of Scott Davidson, it was opened to both genders .

As of 2012, it accommodated 167 students in single rooms with some meals provided, and included: two common rooms with TV, games room, music practice rooms, a library and senior common room. Needler Hall had extensive lawned grounds, including tennis courts.

The university announced, in January 2015, the sale of the Needler Hall site for redevelopment, with plans to continue in its former function until summer 2016. However, due to construction delays at the on-campus accommodation The Courtyard, Needler Hall temporarily housed students unable to move into The Courtyard until work was completed. By December 2016, the last students left the site and Needler Hall was closed permanently in the same month. In early March 2017, demolition work commenced.

The original two bay-window fronted, former Northfields House, section of the old wing of the hall dating to the 1780s was preserved. Now most of the eastern side of the site is an Aldi supermarket and car park.

== Literary connections ==
The poet, presenter and member of the Scaffold, Roger McGough was resident in the hall for three years from 1955; he took a degree in French and Geography and served as hall librarian. Contemporaneously, the poet Philip Larkin became the university's librarian; newly arrived at Hull, he served as a sub-warden at Needler Hall where he took meals, though he lived in private accommodation. When Larkin was required to say a grace before a formal meal in the hall, he reduced it to two terse words, albeit in Latin. In comparison to some of the other university accommodation McGough described Needler as a "Four star hotel." Larkin himself referred to his dining at Needler in a postcard written on 21 February 1956: "I am going to cut out Needler dinners for a bit & eat small things here."

Larkin returned to the hall in 1961, where he recuperated after being hospitalised. He had collapsed during a meeting of the committee responsible for overseeing the university library. Peter Coveney, the hall warden, looked after Larkin who was eventually diagnosed with a form of late-onset epilepsy.

Needler Hall is directly referenced in Roger McGough's poem 'Aubade', itself referring to both Philip Larkin and Larkin's own poem of the same title.

== Notable former residents ==
- Philip Larkin, British poet and librarian
- Roger McGough, British poet and performance poet
- Kevin McNamara, British politician.
- Bereket Selassie, Eritrean/Ethiopian politician, lawyer and academic.
- Frank Field (Baron Field of Birkenhead), British politician

== Wardens ==
- N. H. Poole MA, c. 1938
- Sir Alister Hardy FRS, c. 1941 (acting warden)
- Dr H. H. Lucas, c. 1948
- Margaret Beaton, ?-1951 (Needler was temporarily used as a women's residence after WWII)
- Peter J. Coveney MA, 1951-1962 (married to Margaret Beaton)
- Dr John Biggs, 1962 - 1964
- Robert L. C. Chester BSc, 1964-1979
- Dr Edmund Little, 1979-82 (later a Roman Catholic priest in New Zealand)
- Prof. Scott Davidson, 1982-89

== Bibliography ==
- Bamford, T. W., (1978) The University of Hull: the first fifty years. Published for the University of Hull by Oxford University Press.
- Bowen, P. (2008) A Gallery to Play To: The Story of the Mersey Poets, Liverpool University Press.
- Larkin, P., (2012) Letters to Monica, Faber & Faber.
- McGough, R., (2010) Said And Done, Random House.
- Neave, D., (1995) Yorkshire: York and the East Riding, Second edition. Yale University Press. ISBN 0 300 09593 7
- Selassie, B. H., (2007) The crown and the pen: the memoirs of a lawyer turned rebel, The Red Sea Press.
