= Ford Global Anthem =

Ford ad campaign

Ford Global Anthem, 1999
- Agency: JWT Detroit
- Client: Ford Motor Company Detroit
- Language: English
- Running time: 30, 60, 120 seconds
- Product: automotive advertising
- Release date: November 1, 1999 (television)
- Directed by: Arthur Ted Powell/Edouard Nammour
- Music by: Danny Beckerman/Charlotte Church
- Production company: Atherton, New York
- Produced by: George Wieser/Susan DePalma
- Country: USA

"Global Anthem" was an American television commercial created by advertising agency JWT Detroit for Ford Motor Company (FMC) in 1999. It was Ford's first ever global advertising campaign. At the time, the commercial was believed to be the world's biggest advertisement, one of the largest single commercial productions in US advertising history, and one of the most expensive. In media terms, it was the most widespread use of one commercial at one time by a giant advertiser. Initially, a single two-minute version aired in almost every country in the world simultaneously at 9pm on November 1, 1999, reaching an estimated one billion people, 300 million households, and 80% of the world's viewing population. It was recorded as the world's first global media roadblock in the Guinness Book of World Records in 1999.

== Campaign ==
Global Anthem was Ford Motor Company's first global television advertising campaign, and the first television advertisement to include all seven of their car marques – Ford, Aston Martin, Jaguar, Lincoln, Mazda, Mercury and Volvo – together in one integrated message.

The commercial was conceived by Arthur Ted Powell, then senior partner and international creative director on the Ford account at the Detroit office of Ford's long time advertising agency, J. Walter Thompson (JWT), a unit of WPP group that handled Ford assignments including the Ford division.

=== Intended message ===
At the turn of the millennium, Ford was the world's second largest auto company with aspirations to be global leader in the market. As a company they were no longer defined by their trademark blue oval logo but by an umbrella of recently acquired international auto brands. The company wanted to communicate that Ford was a truly global company with a set of very strong global brands. Jacques Nasser, then CEO and President of Ford, saw "Global Anthem" – as the commercial became known – and the approach of the new millennium and impending 100th anniversary of the car company Henry Ford founded in 1903 as a rare and timely advertising opportunity to raise the corporate profile of Ford Motor Company internationally.

== Strategy ==
The strategy was to combine celebratory hype surrounding the new millennium with an emotional message from Ford Motor Company about their seven brands, and create a positive feeling about the company and brand in the mind of the public. They planned to do this by showcasing their vehicles within the context of people's everyday lives, and to celebrate their customers in all their national and cultural diversity.

The plan was to get the widest possible exposure of the Ford message from a single airing of one global multi-brand commercial over a 24-hour period two months ahead of the year 2000. Monday night was scheduled for the launch because in the US it attracted televisions biggest audiences of the week.

== Video ==
The commercial features but does not identify by name 13-year-old Welsh soprano Charlotte Church singing "Just Wave Hello". The spot showcases all seven Ford automobile brands and an amalgam of chrome-colored nameplates under the Ford name. Twenty-five different contemporary and vintage Ford vehicles appear in the advertisement, including a 1950s Ford Falcon, Ford Model T, Ford Thunderbird, 1950s Jaguar, Ford F-Series pickup, 1999 Ford Mustang, Ford Expedition, Mazda Premacy, Jaguar XK8, Jaguar S-Type, Ford Courier, Ford Focus, 1950s Lincoln, Volvo S80 and S40, Mercury Cougar, Ford Mondeo, Aston Martin, 2000 Ford Focus, Lincoln LS, the automaker's concept vehicle Synergy 2000 and an assortment of old and new pickup, transit and wagon vehicles, trucks and buses to keep emphasis on the human experience of owning, driving or travelling in an automobile. There is no narrative or voice over. The words of the song are sometimes matched to a montage of nearly 60 scenes of people of different social strata and cultures in nine different countries gesturing hello and goodbye, highlighting the cultural diversity of FMC customers around the world. In the closing sequence, Church appears on camera singing "Just Wave Hello" as the sun rises over the horizon at the Minack Theatre near Land's End in Cornwall, England.

== Music ==
The sound track "Just Wave Hello" was an original composition by Danny Beckerman and written in collaboration with Arthur Ted Powell and recorded by Charlotte Church at Olympic Studios in London on July 7, 1999. The words of the song "It's time to go now - It's time to wave hello now" were selected to symbolically represent the going of the old and coming of the new millennium. The backing track was recorded with an 80 piece adult choir, 20 children from the Melbourne Grammar School choir, around 20 singers from the Melbourne University Choral Society and 65 orchestral players from the Melbourne Symphony Orchestra. Beckerman later lengthened the final mix into a full-length song. "Just Wave Hello" became the first track on Church's self-titled second album Charlotte Church (1999) released by Sony Classical Records on November 15, 1999. The backing track for the album version (Sony) was recorded with the London Welsh Male Voice Choir and the London Symphony Orchestra and produced by English pop music record producer Trevor Horn for Sony Classical Records (US). "Just Wave Hello" was also included in Prelude: The Best of Charlotte Church (2002) and Classics for a New Century (2003).

"Just Wave Hello" was released as a single and reached number 31 on the classic charts in the UK for 4 weeks and number 40 on Billboard US rankings in January 2000. Church sang "Just Wave Hello" at the Millennium Dome in London as part of the official millennium celebrations, and in front of a crowd of 72,000 people at the closing ceremony of the Rugby World Cup final at Cardiff Arms Park in Church's hometown of Cardiff in Wales in November 1999, and numerous concerts and events around the world, including Macy's Thanksgiving Day Parade in New York on 25 November 1999.

== Production ==
The commercial was directed by Edouard Nammour and produced by New York production company Atherton. Filming began in Argentina on May 10 and finished on August 6, 1999, in Vancouver Canada, it took over ninety days in fifteen locations in nine countries: Argentina, Australia, Canada, China, England, Germany, Italy, Japan and the USA. The crew captured 200 different scenes and 60 appeared in the commercial. Director of photography Simon Duggan from Sydney Australia shot an estimated 150,000 feet of film that was cut into 1,2,3 minute versions by Third Floor Editing senior editor Barry McMann over six weeks in Toronto, Canada. The cast of extras included over 800 non-actors selected from parks, churches, nightclubs, malls and markets across different locations. The worldwide production crew was almost as large, numbering in the 700-person range.

== Media ==
The two-minute version was broadcast over 140 pan-regional and local market networks in 190 countries at 9pm on Monday November 1, 1999. It aired first in New Zealand on the Internet then headed west around the world. By the end of the day, it had aired in South America, Canada, Asia, the Pacific Rim, the Middle East, India, the United Kingdom, Europe and Africa, everywhere except North Korea. It ran in the same time slot on every major global satellite and cable network (including CNN, MTV and ESPN), pan-regional (including STAR TV, TNT LA, CNN Plus and NTV) and terrestrial stations in USA, Canada, Britain, France, Germany, Italy, Spain, Sweden and Australia. In the US, it aired on 40 free-to-air and cable channels alone, including the big four networks (ABC, CBS, Fox Broadcasting, NBC). Due to the time difference across the United States, viewers on the West Coast saw the commercial on some cable networks as early as 6pm. The result was near-universal coverage of the entire USA. It was shown on huge electronic screens at 9pm in Times Square New York, Piccadilly Circus London and Ginza Tokyo. The commercial launch was timed to tie in with the North American International Motor Show (NAIAS) held in Detroit in January 2000 at which Ford broke precedent by showing its various brand in an integrated display.

Television viewers in the USA saw Anthem again on January 1, 2000, during coverage of highly watched events, including the Rose Parade on the ABC and CBS networks. The ad also aired on New Year's Day during broadcast coverage of blockbuster movies like The Bodyguard on CBS and Jurassic Park on NBC, in addition to running on other network and cable programs. The two-minute spot was edited and cut into additional one-minute versions and continued to air on global networks periodically on network and cable TV stations throughout the first quarter of 2000. Charlotte Church performed the song "Just Wave Hello" at several public appearances following the November 1 airing.

=== Partnerships ===
J Walter Thompson Detroit was assisted by other Ford agencies, including Ogilvy & Mather Worldwide, also part of the WPP group that handled Ford assignments including the Ford division, and Young & Rubicam Advertising. Media buying was done by Ford Motor Media and Mindshare, a joint venture of Thompson and Ogilvy.

The global roadblock was one of a series of television events involving mass marketers Ford and Sony. The millennium promotion was intended to further the reputation of Ford automobiles and provide added exposure for Sony and Church's album Charlotte Church.

== Cost ==
Ford declined at the time to say how much it cost to run the ad globally. Published estimates of the media buy alone were between $10–15 million – up to $20 million was reported in some media. Estimated production costs in some media were around $5 million.

== Reception ==
=== Honours ===
Global Anthem was described as Ford's first truly global advertising campaign. Some media commentators at the time compared it to iconic television commercials "I'd Like to Teach the World to Sing" (Coca-Cola, 1988) and "Face" (British Airways, 1989) as historically significant. It won recognition in the Guinness Book of World Records 1999, "For execution of the first ever global media 'roadblock' commercial, seen concurrently in every time zone of the world and over 140 countries."

=== Criticism ===
The size, scale and timing of the commercial going to air and the general feel-good factor this generated was reported on widely in international, national and local news media, and automotive, advertising, marketing, media, music and screen trade journals around the world. The general sentiment was that a company like Ford had bragging rights on the last century and building a message around trust and esteem rather than overt selling was something big brands like Ford were able to do successfully at this time. The commercial has a documentary-like feel; it wasn't seen as visually groundbreaking but was described as "beautiful". and "more subtle than the usual car ad." It was an unusual strategy for a marketer to tout all its brands in one commercial and a new branding approach for an automaker. Some media critics called the "roadblock" a "stunt". One article raised the question of whether the hearing-impaired girl signing goodbye was "just one more entry into the corporate diversity-compassion sweepstakes of the '90s."

=== Awards ===
Year	Award	Organisation
1999	Exemplary execution of the Ford "Global Anthem" advertising campaign.	Ford Marketing Excellence Award
2000	Gold for best original music	London International Advertising Awards
2000	Best automotive campaign, best music, best cinematography, best in show	Mobius Awards
2000	International Gold Medal award for effective marketing	AME Awards
2000	Copper awards for 2:00/3:30/0:60 versions	Axiem Awards
2000	Best editing	International Monitor Awards
2000	Best music	Caddy Awards

=== Social impact ===
Ford strategically announced their two-minute commercial broadcast plans in advance and there was widespread news coverage prior to the ads premier. A secondary benefit of the marketing strategy was the internal promotion value it carried to Ford's employees, suppliers and dealers.

== Effectiveness and unwanted repercussions ==
=== Censorship ===
An unscripted scene with the Chinese Army unexpectedly marching into shot at Meridian Gate in the Forbidden City in Beijing was edited out of the commercial that aired in China. A request came from a governing body of medical doctors in the United Kingdom who expressed concern that the fast-moving scenes could trigger an attack among those with epilepsy and adjustments were made.

=== Legacy ===
It was the first time any corporation anywhere had done a global roadblock – buying time on every channel to air an advertisement at the same time.
