= GuildHE Research =

British higher education training provider

- GuildHE Research logo
- Formation: 2010
- Type: Higher Education training provider
- Headquarters: London, United Kingdom
- Region served: United Kingdom
- Key people: Professor John Strachan, Director
- Parent organization: GuildHE
- Website: https://research.guildhe.ac.uk

GuildHE Research is an organisation that provides training and support for researchers and students in Britain. It is a sub-association of GuildHE.

GuildHE Research was known as the Consortium for Research Excellence, Support and Training (or CREST) from its inception in 2010 until March 2019.

The organisation was set up with strategic development funding from the Higher Education Funding Council for England, which was matched by phased subscriptions from members. It is currently self-sustained, receiving funding from member organisations.

== Activities ==
GuildHE Research is particularly focussed on providing support and training to researchers at smaller organisations who might otherwise have less access to training and networks. This builds upon the concept of there being "islands of research excellence", an idea that arose from the 2008 Research Assessment Exercise.

The organisation organises symposia, organises training, and curates and disseminates information on research policy such as the Research Excellence Framework.

CREST was a signatory of concordats such as the Concordat to Support the Career Development of Researchers, the Concordat to Support Research Integrity, and the Concordat for Engaging the Public with Research.

== Open access and open data ==
GuildHE Research have investigated how smaller institutions can make research available via open access and open data. In 2014, Jisc provided the organisation with funding to develop a research data management system to support smaller and specialist institutions. This was followed, in 2016, by involvement in the pilot of a research data shared service.

Research outputs of member institutions are made open access via an online repository.

== Members ==
Members include:

- Bath Spa University
- Bishop Grosseteste University
- Buckinghamshire New University
- Falmouth University
- Glyndŵr University
- Harper Adams University
- Leeds College of Art
- Leeds Trinity University
- Newman University
- Norwich University of the Arts
- Plymouth College of Art
- Ravensbourne
- Royal Agricultural University
- Southampton Solent University
- St Mary’s University, Twickenham
- University for the Creative Arts
- University of Chichester
- University of Cumbria
- University of St Mark and St John
- The University of Winchester
- University of Worcester
- Writtle University College
- York St John University
