= Thwaite Hall =

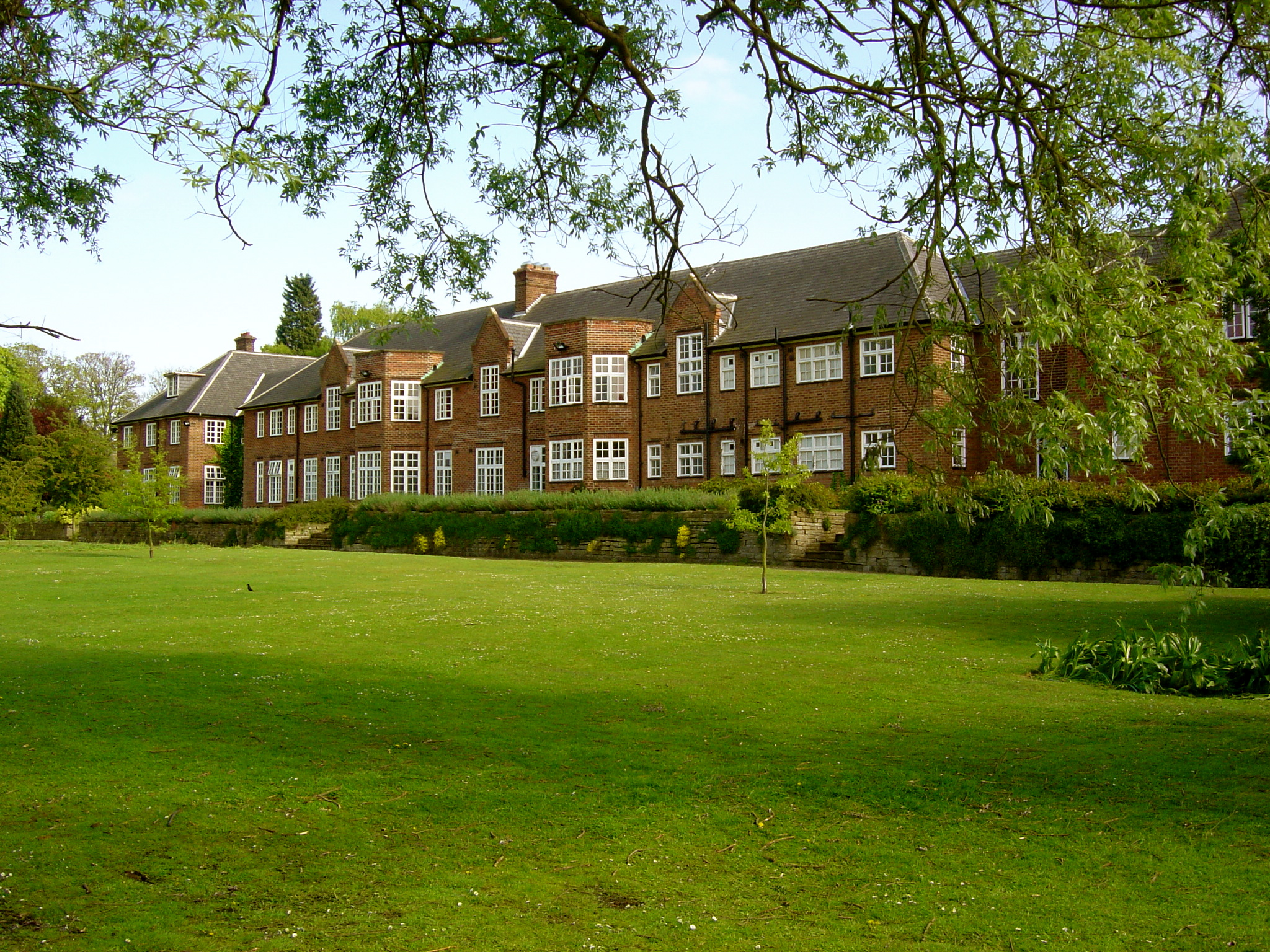
- Thwaite Hall, Cottingham
- Interactive map of the Thwaite Hall area
- Former names: Thwaite House

General information
- Type: Hall of residence
- Location: Cottingham, East Riding of Yorkshire, England
- Coordinates: 53.77915°N 0.40006°W
- OS grid reference: TA 05392 32798
- Completed: 1803–1807 (as private residence)
- Renovated: First renovation 1875, expansion 1930s–40s
- Owner: University of Hull

Technical details
- Floor count: 2

Thwaite Hall was a traditional hall of residence of the University of Hull, located in Cottingham, East Riding of Yorkshire, England.

== History and description ==
Thwaite House was built in Cottingham, East Riding of Yorkshire between 1803 and 1807, it was acquired in 1872 by David Wilson and sold to his brother Charles Wilson, 1st Baron Nunburnholme in 1875, who substantially enlarged it and converted it into a mansion. After further changes of ownership in 1928, along with Needler Hall, it was acquired by the newly created university college, and expanded in the 1930s and 40s into a hall of residence.

In 2009, it consisted of 187 rooms and included a junior common room, a TV room, games room, library and senior common room. Thwaite Hall had 24 acres (97,000 m^{2}) of grounds including parkland, meadows, a lake, and sport facilities.

It was announced in summer 2017 that the hall would not be taking in new students in September 2017 due to a lack of demand, leaving the future of the halls uncertain. In June 2018, the university placed the hall on the open market as a redevelopment opportunity.
