= Arthur Ted Powell =

British-born advertising art director, landscape/cityscape artist and printmaker

- Born: Arthur Edward Powell; February 1947 (age 79); Kingsbury, London, United Kingdom
- Education: Ealing Art College
- Known for: advertising, landscape painting, portrait painting, printmaking, assemblage
- Movement: Abstract expressionism, Auto-destructive art

Arthur Edward (Ted) Powell (born 1947) is a British-born advertising art director, landscape/cityscape artist and printmaker living in Melbourne Australia. In 1999, he conceived and directed Ford Global Anthem, the Ford Motor Company's first global television advertising campaign. At the beginning of the 21st century, the commercial was believed to be the world's biggest advertisement.

== Early life and education ==
Powell was born and raised in Neasden, a working-class suburb of London, the only son of an electrical engineer and his wife, a box assembler at National Cash Register (NCR) in Brent Cross. He was educated at John Kelly Boys' Technology College (now Crest Boys' Academy) in Neasden.

Powell studied Fine Art and Advertising Design at Ealing Art College in West London from 1963 to 1968. He was a student in Roy Ascott's experimental 'Groundcourse', a method as influential as it was unorthodox in its approach to teaching art. The radical curricula and behaviourist experiments at Ealing between 1961 and 1964 made it one of the most controversial art courses in the history of British art education.

While Powell was a student at Ealing, he worked part-time as a cel painter on the 90-minute Beatles' animated movie Yellow Submarine (1968), designed by Heinz Edelmann and directed by George Dunning. He was one of 'a team of mostly young, unsung artists [who] toiled away in rinky-dink offices in Soho Square, London, for nearly a year' 'working long .... shifts in the ink and paint department.' He mostly painted cels for Lucy in the Sky with Diamonds and Nowhere Man sequences.

== Work ==
After graduating, Powell worked as an advertising art director at Leo Burnett Worldwide London. In 1976, he migrated to Australia and was employed at various agencies in Melbourne, including the local office of US-based advertising agency JWT (J Walter Thompson) and later regional offices in Auckland, Taipei, Detroit, London and Bangkok. In his spare time after work and on weekends, he recorded life on the streets and city skylines from apartment and hotel rooftops in major cities in Australasia, Europe and America where he lived, visited and worked in artist sketchbooks. These sketches would become visual reference for future cityscape paintings. He returned to Melbourne in 2004 to paint full-time.

== Advertising ==
In advertising, Powell is notable for conceiving and directing the mammoth Ford Global Anthem advertisement for Ford Motor Company in 1999. At the time, it was believed to be one of the biggest television commercial productions in US advertising history, and one of the most widespread use of one commercial at one time by a giant advertiser. It was recorded as the world's first global media roadblock in the Guinness Book of World Records in 1999.

Major brands were enamoured with music in advertising in the 1990s because of its ubiquity in consumer’s lives, and were aligning themselves with celebrity musicians, using them to endorse their products as a way of cutting through market clutter. As regional (Asia) and later international creative director of the newly-formed Ford/JWT Global Business Unit (1995-2004), Powell collaborated with Melbourne-based British songwriter and music composer Danny Beckerman (1948-2006) to conceive and produce six songs as sound tracks for Ford television commercials between 1995-1999. Four were recorded for JWT/Ford (Taiwan) and wider release in the Greater China entertainment market by two of Hong Kong’s Cantopop ‘Four Heavenly Kings’ (四大天王) as they were described in the Chinese-language media at the time: Jacky Cheung (Cheung Hok Yau, 张学友) recorded True Love (真爱, 1995, Polygram) and Farewell (拥有, 1995, Polygram). Andy Lau (Lau Tak Wah, 刘德华) recorded Darling/Because of Love (因为爱, 1996, Philips Records) and Love is a Miracle/Love is Mysterious (如此神奇, 1997, Philips Records). Hong Kong singer Sandy Lam (Kik-Lin, 林忆莲) sang Say Goodbye (我心仍在, 1997, Rock Records). Just Wave Hello (1999, Sony Classical Records) was recorded by Welsh soprano Charlotte Church as the soundtrack for the Ford Global Anthem television commercial. The song was simultaneously released as a single and lead track on her self-titled second album Charlotte Church in 1999.

== Art ==
=== Major themes and styles ===
Australia from an outsider's view became a major theme in his landscapes and cityscapes. His early style was representational and later became more experimental and abstracted.

=== Landscapes ===
At the time, Powell's work was strongly influenced by two well-known Australian landscape artists. The first was Australian painter and printmaker Fred Williams (1927–1982) who Powell never met and whose method he adopted of reworking the same motif a number of times in different mediums and over a number of years. The other was Clifton Pugh AO (1924–1990) who Powell accompanied on a three-week painting trip to the Kimberley Ranges in Western Australia in 1989. It was under Pugh's influence and tutelage he first painted the unique landscape of Outback Australia. In 2005, he went back to the Kimberley Ranges to camp and paint the landscape for three weeks and find a new direction for his art.

=== Installation and portraiture ===
Between 2007 and 2009, his focus shifted from landscapes to more social and political themes across a variety of mediums, genres and styles, including portraiture and installation. White Trash was a multimedia installation created out of discarded factory-made household objects found on the streets near his home and studio over a three-week period in 2007, and was part of a group exhibition on the theme of 'Contamination' (2007) at Gasworks Arts Park, Albert Park, Victoria. The title of the work was a verbal pun on the environmental havoc caused by predominantly 'white' Australians discarding unwanted household items in suburban streets. When asked if the assemblage of white and white painted found objects, including an old car bonnet, bedheads, cigarettes and discarded electrical items was a work of art, Powell described it as more of an expression of an appalling sense of waste in contemporary consumer society. When the exhibition ended, the installation was disassembled and the objects taken to the council waste facility in nearby Port Melbourne for disposal.

A private commission of fifteen paintings on the theme of endangered forests in Australia for a prominent Riverina winery in 2006 sparked an interest in conservation, and concern about the impact excessive logging, road building and too frequent burning off was having on native animals. This culminated in a joint exhibition of animal portraits, titled Poetic Fauna, in 2009 with fellow Briton, writer and poet Bryan S. Cooper. As migrants to Australia in the 1970s, their view was that most animals unique to Australia were either cherished as national symbols or considered dangerous and generally treated badly by humans. The poems that accompanied the paintings, sketches and mono prints used the 'voice' of the animals themselves as a form of protest against their treatment.

=== Cityscapes ===
The city of Melbourne had a profound effect on Powell's work and became the primary motif from 2009 onwards. His first urban landscapes or cityscapes were of Melbourne, and mostly around the industrial area near the Westgate Bridge that spans the Yarra River linking the east to the west of the city. Fred Williams had produced a group of four large strip format gouache-on-paper paintings called the West Gate Bridge series showing the half-constructed bridge in 1970, and had planned to paint the length of the river but he lost heart in the project after a section of the bridge collapsed on 15 October 1970, while it was still under construction, killing thirty-five workers. The story of the collapse was far from fading in people's memory forty years on and Powell saw the anniversary as an opportunity to present the iconic bridge in new light.

Maps had been a recurring theme in Powell's work since his art school days at Ealing Art College. In the mid-Sixties, they took the form of diagrams and maps that bore some semblance to 'mind maps' and structural systems that figured in Roy Ascott's teaching. In paintings exhibited between 2011 and 2018, Powell re-imagined his adopted hometown using grid-like structures and abstract shapes that resembled maps. It had been announced in the local news media that Melbourne was set to become Australia's biggest city by 2035 years and Powell felt a sense of urgency to capture the visual essence of the city footprint as the city grew and evolved. In these works he tilted Melbourne's urban landscape full against the picture plane in a style reminiscent of not only his early student work but indigenous Australian art. He abstracted the city footprint further by superimposing the imprint of the street grid system first laid down by colonial surveyor and artist Robert Hoddle (1794–1881) in the 19th century over familiar landmarks created by later generations of town planners and architects, construction workers and engineers.

=== Urban sketches ===
Powell placed great importance on drawing and produced many preparatory sketches and drawings for later works in panorama sketchbooks and long concertina notebooks at his studio, on the streets and in cafes near his inner city home and in the Americas, Europe, Asia, Australia and New Zealand where he had lived, using simple drawing tools and palette. His visual documentation of Melbourne streets has been compared to that of early pioneer Wilbraham Liardet (1799-1878), an Australian hotelier, water-colour artist and historian, who was responsible for the early development of Port Melbourne. Sketchbooks tracing the development along the Port Phillip Bay foreshore and capturing the precise layout of the streets of South Melbourne, Port Melbourne and Albert Park are part of the City of Port Phillip Collection. Sketchbooks of Melbourne are also held in the State Library of Victoria's rare books collection and City of Melbourne collection. Many of his sketchbooks predate the release of the online tool Google Street View by more than a decade yet appear to evoke the same pull and zoom effect created by the interactive technology.

== Documentary films featuring Arthur Ted Powell ==
Artscape: Artists At Work – Gasworks, 30 minutes, ABC1, aired 19 August 2008. Filmed over 6 weeks, the documentary gives a glimpse inside Powell’s studio and working life and other artists in the arts precinct where he worked.

== Charity work ==
In 1983, Powell volunteered as a firefighter in the Otway Ranges in Victoria during the Ash Wednesday bushfires, the deadliest bushfire in Australian history (until the Black Saturday bushfires in 2009). He donated a painting to be auctioned at the Art for Life bush fire appeal, at the Melbourne Town Hall in 2009 to raise money for the rebuilding of communities tragically affected by the recent bushfires.

Powell donated paintings to various charities, including the Lighthouse Charity Trust for their Annual Lighthouse Art Auction at the Australian Centre for Contemporary Art (ACCA) in 2010. The proceeds from his paintings and others donated by colleagues respected and prominent in advertising and art helped Lighthouse continue to care for young people in need.
