= Crested (duck breed) =

Breed of domestic duck

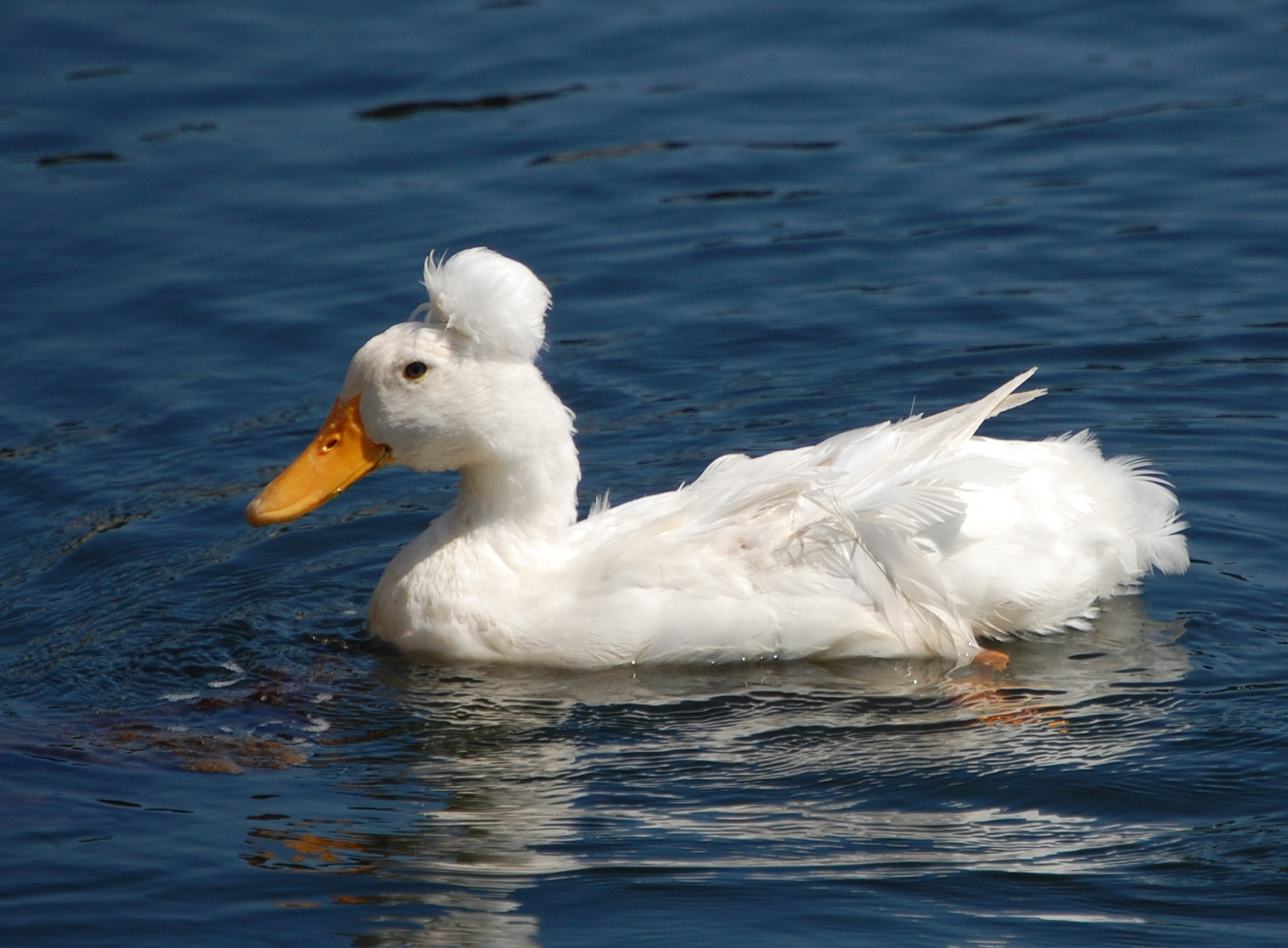
- In the harbour of Camden, Maine
- Conservation status: FAO (2007): critical; DAD-IS (2022): at risk/unknown
- Standard: Poultry Club of Great Britain

Traits
- Weight: Male: Standard: 3.2 kg; Bantam: 1.125 kg; Female: Standard: 2.7 kg; Bantam: 0.9 kg
- Egg colour: blue, green, tinted or white

Classification
- APA: medium duck
- EE: yes
- PCGB: light

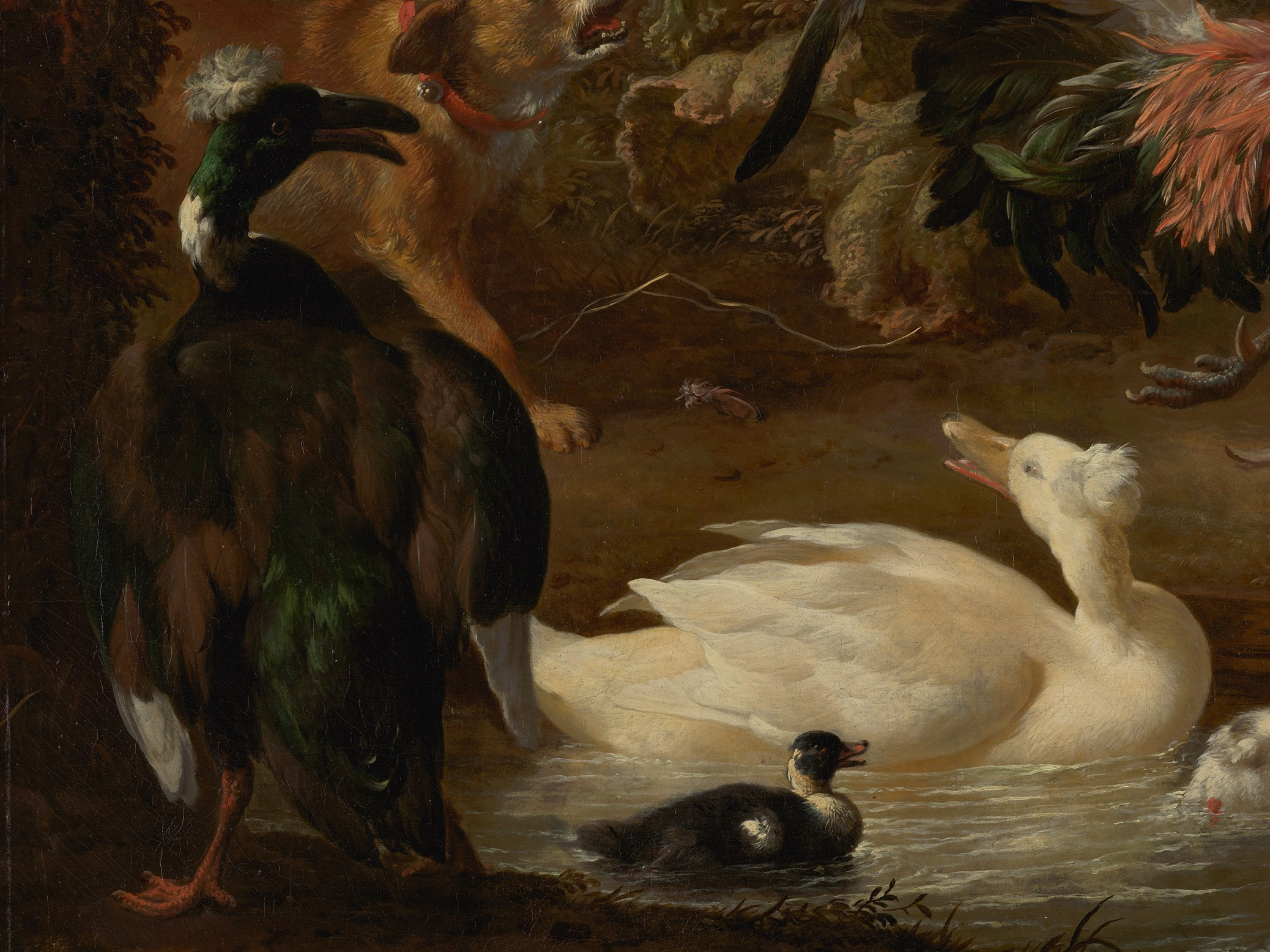
Detail of Kippen en eenden, painting by Melchior d'Hondecoeter, about 1680

The Crested is a breed of domestic duck, characterised by a crest or tuft of feathers on the head. Ducks of this kind were probably brought from the East Indies to Europe by Dutch ships. The duck may be of any colour; the crest results from the action of an autosomal dominant gene and varies widely in size, from imperceptibly small to a diameter of approximately 13 cm.

== History ==
The Crested probably originates in the East Indies, with subsequent development in Holland. Crested ducks are seen in seventeenth-century paintings such as those of Melchior d'Hondecoeter and Jan Steen.

In the United States the breed was described by D.J. Browne in 1853. The white Crested was added to the American Standard of Perfection of the American Poultry Association in 1874; the black variant was added in 1977. The Crested was recognised in the United Kingdom in 1910.

A bantam version of the breed, the Crested Miniature, was bred by John Hall and Roy Sutcliffe in the United Kingdom in the late twentieth century; it was recognised in 1997.

== Characteristics ==
Apart from the crest, the Crested is an ordinary-looking duck of medium size. It may be of any colour: in Europe, the Entente Européenne lists eleven colours, and also states that any colour is permitted; in the United States only black and white are recognised.

A crest of feathers may appear in any duck breed or type deriving from the wild Mallard, Anas platyrhynchos, with a frequency of some 0.0001%–0.001% of all eggs hatched. It results from the action of a very variable autosomal dominant allele, which is semi-lethal and may display incomplete penetrance as well as incomplete dominance. As with other similar mutations, birds heterozygous for the crested allele Cr^{Cr} are expected to be crested, while those that are homozygous are expected to die in the egg, and those without the gene have no crest. This would lead – in matings of two crested birds – to an expected ratio of crested to uncrested hatchlings of about 2:1; observed data indicates that a crest occurs in some 30%–40% of ducklings hatched.

The crest varies widely in size, from imperceptibly small to a diameter of approximately 13 cm. The crest allele is associated with a number of abnormalities in the structure of the brain and skull, including larger-than-expected brain size, abnormal cranial bone formation, fontanelles or perforations of the skull, intracranial lipomas or fat bodies, and reduced size of the cerebellum, the olfactory bulb and the prepyriform area; with physical deformities including shortening of the body, wry neck and wry tail, and with neurological disorders including impaired motor co-ordination, with symptoms such as an unsteady walk or inability to get up after a fall.

Researchers at the Wissenschaftlichen Geflügelhof of the Bund Deutscher Rassegeflügelzüchter at Rommerskirchen have developed a test to assess the extent of motor impairment in individual ducks: the bird is placed on its back on a flat surface, with its feet in the air, and the time it takes to stand up is measured. Birds able to right themselves quickly – within a second to two – were found to have a higher rate of hatching, and to hatch a lower number of ducklings with physical or neurological defects.

== Use ==
The Crested may be reared for eggs and meat like any other duck; the eggs may be blue, green, tinted or white. The birds may also be kept for showing or for ornament.
