= Centre for Renewable Energy Systems Technology =

Research centre at Loughborough University, England

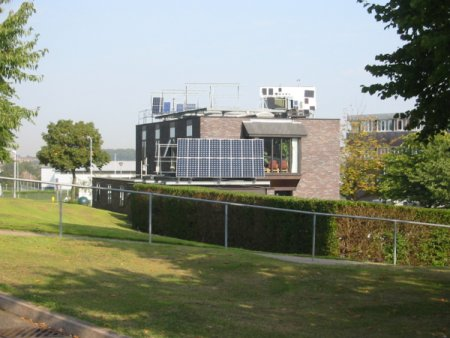
Angela Marmont Lab, CREST, Loughborough University

The Centre for Renewable Energy Systems Technology (CREST) is a research centre into renewable energy based in the Department of Mechanical, Electrical and Manufacturing Engineering, Loughborough University in England.

== Profile ==
Established in 1993, it is recognised internationally as a centre of excellence in its field particularly in photovoltaic systems, materials and devices, wind power and integration of renewable energy into electricity grids. About fifty researchers, academics and associated staff are involved with CREST's work.

The MSc course in Renewable Energy Systems Technology, developed at CREST, is one of the longest established renewable energy masters courses globally. It is producing a stream of graduates who are working internationally in all aspects of the renewables industry. This course can be studied full-time or part-time distance learning. As an advanced technology course, the modules in the CREST MSc include biomass, wind, solar, water/marine and electrical integration. There is a strong emphasis on electrical generation throughout.

== History ==
The centre was initially set up through the funding of Professor Tony Marmont of Beacon Energy, who remains a mentor and advisory committee member. Other advisory members include Sir Jonathon Porritt and Dr Andrew Garrad of Garrad Hassan & Partners Ltd. Professor Phil Eames is the director of CREST and Leon Freris is a visiting professor. Professor Freris, and Dr David Sharpe, a leading British wind turbine aerodynamicist who also worked at the centre, were founding members of the British Wind Energy Association (now RenewableUK). David Sharpe has since become known for his work as the inventor of the Aerogenerator.

== Associations ==
The Masters course is one of only sixteen programmes in the UK admitted to the Panasonic Fellowship programme (run by the Royal Academy of Engineering). The Panasonic Fellowship programme is aimed at recent graduates who wish to embark on a full-time master's degree course in environmental studies or sustainable development.

CREST is a participating university in the EUREC European Masters Program in Renewable Energy, an initiative supported by the European Commission to expand the European renewable energy industry.

The group is located in the Holywell Park area of the Loughborough campus, adjacent to the offices of the Energies Technology Institute (ETI).
