= USS Crest =

Minesweeper of the United States Navy

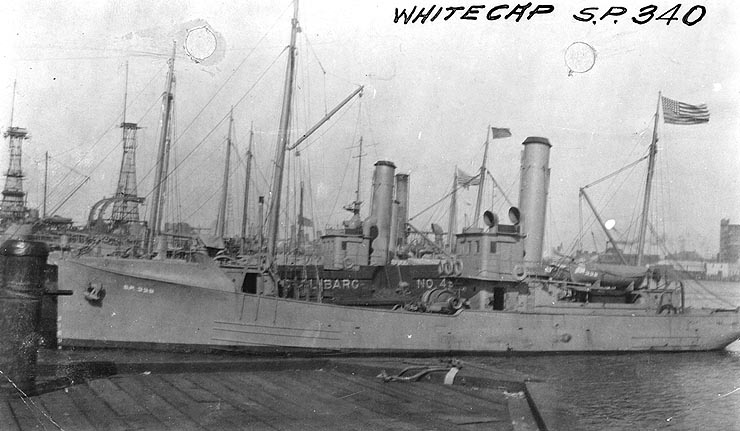
- USS Crest. The photograph is annotated "WHITECAP S.P. 340" because of Crest's similarity of design to patrol vessel USS Whitecap (SP-340).

History

United States
- Name: USS Crest
- Namesake: Previous name retained
- Completed: 1911
- Acquired: 1917
- Commissioned: 8 May 1917
- Decommissioned: 28 January 1919
- Fate: Returned to owners April 1919
- Notes: Operated as commercial fishing trawler Crest 1911–1917 and from 1919

General characteristics
- Type: Minesweeper
- Tonnage: 244 tons
- Length: 126 ft (38 m)
- Beam: 22 ft 5 in (6.83 m)
- Draft: 13 ft (4.0 m)
- Speed: 10 knots
- Complement: 21
- Armament: 1 × 3-pounder gun

USS Crest (SP-339) was a United States Navy minesweeper in commission from 1917 to 1919.

Crest was built in 1911 as a commercial fishing trawler of the same name at Quincy, Massachusetts. The U.S. Navy chartered Crest in 1917 for World War I service and commissioned her as USS Crest (SP-339) on 8 May 1917.

Fitted out as a minesweeper and assigned to the 1st Naval District, Crest carried out minesweeping, patrol, escort, and rescue operations along the coast of northern New England during World War I.

Crest was decommissioned on 28 January 1919 and returned to her owners in April 1919.
