= E-ACT Crest Academy =

School in Brent, London, England

Location
- Crest Road; Neasden, Greater London, NW2 7SN; England; 51.5634°N 0.2419°W

Information
- Type: Academy
- Motto: Success in everything we do!
- Established: 01/09/2009
- Local authority: Brent
- Department for Education URN: 135973 Tables
- Ofsted: Reports
- Principals: Andrea Rosewell, Sikhu Ngwenya, Akeem Edwards
- Staff: -4
- Gender: Mixed
- Age: 11 to 19
- Enrolment: 1200
- Capacity: 2100
- Houses: University, Leadership, Professionalism, Relationships, Integrity, Social Justice, Empowerment
- Colours: Pine green & gold (uniform: black & sky blue)
- Website: https://crestacademy.e-act.org.uk/

E-ACT Crest Academy is a secondary school with academy status located in Neasden, Brent, North West London. The school opened in September 2014 replacing Crest Girls' Academy, Crest Boys' Academy and Crest Sixth Form. E-ACT Crest Academy serves the local communities of Neasden, Dollis Hill and Cricklewood. The school was the centre of controversy in June 2015 when the leadership of the school scrapped the retention of single gender teaching, instead opting for a co-educational, integrated model against the wishes of some parents.

E-ACT Crest Academy is sponsored by E-ACT. who provide support through a Systems Leader, who challenges and supports the academy. The school's System Leader is Dame Joan McVittie. The school has undergone a transformation with a significant increase in GCSE results, achieving 53% 5A*-C including English & Maths in 2016, reversing a period of decline at the school.

E-ACT Crest Academy is led by Mohsen Ojja, who joined in January 2015 and has installed a new Leadership Team. Shortly after his appointment the school was inspected by Ofsted and deemed to require Special Measures for the third consecutive time. In October 2016, the Academy was graded 'Good' in all areas by Ofsted.

In September 2014, E-ACT Crest Academy opened in a new £40 million building, designed by Capita Symonds and built by Wates Construction.
