= Crest (video game) =

2018 strategy video game

- Developer: Eat Create Sleep
- Publisher: Eat Create Sleep
- Platforms: Windows, OS X, Linux
- Release: March 8, 2018
- Genre: God game
- Mode: Single-player

Crest is a god game by Eat Create Sleep for Microsoft Windows, OS X, and Linux. It was released into Steam Early Access on 23 April 2015. and launched on 8 March 2018.

== Gameplay ==
Crest is a strategy game with low poly design, survival and god game elements, and influences from the Populous, and Dwarf Fortress video games.

== Development ==
Crest is being developed by Eat Create Sleep. The game exceeded its crowdfunding goal of US$20,000 by raising US$21,964 in 2014 on Indiegogo. The game was greenlit through Steam Greenlight on 19 November 2014 and released into Steam Early Access, for Microsoft Windows, OS X, and Linux, on 23 April 2015.

As of January 2018, the game is still in development and receives regular updates up to several times a month.
