= Birmingham Newman University =

University in Birmingham, England

- Coat of arms
- Former names: Newman College of Higher Education; Newman University College
- Motto: Latin: Ex Umbris in Veritatem
- Motto in English: From the shadows to the truth
- Type: Public
- Established: 1968
- Religious affiliation: Roman Catholic
- Academic affiliations: Cathedrals Group
- Vice-Chancellor: Jackie Dunne
- Students: 5,500 (2024/25)
- Undergraduates: 4,775 (2024/25)
- Postgraduates: 725 (2024/25)
- Location: Birmingham, England; 52.4336°N 1.9938°W
- Campus: Suburban
- Website: newman.ac.uk

Birmingham Newman University is a public university based in the suburb of Bartley Green in Birmingham, England. The university was founded in 1968 as Newman College of Higher Education. From 2008 to 2013, it was known as Newman University College, gaining full university status in 2013. From 2013 to 2023, it was known as Newman University and Birmingham Newman University in 2023.

== History ==
The university is named after the 19th-century religious figure John Henry Newman, who had strong links with the city of Birmingham as an Oratorian and a member of the Birmingham Oratory. His view of a university was of a scholarly community wherein the focus should be on training the mind to think rather than the simple diffusion of knowledge.

In 1965, the Catholic Archbishop of Birmingham, George Patrick Dwyer, donated land in Bartley Green that was once the site of Athol House Farm for the purposes of building a teacher training college. In 1966, while under construction, the college appointed Simon Quinlan as its first principal and Joe Blackledge as vice principal. At its opening, the college was the first mixed-gender institution under lay control. The college accepted its first group of 182 students in 1968.

Initially, the college's degree qualifications were awarded by the University of Birmingham. In 1983, under threat of closure, the college entered into an agreement with nearby Westhill College to share facilities. This relationship ended abruptly in 1998 when Coventry University started to award all degrees and Westhill College was absorbed into the University of Birmingham. Between 2003 and 2008, the University of Leicester validated all degrees at the college. The Privy Council gave the institution degree-awarding powers in 2007, finally marking the institution's independence.

Between the years 2000 and 2008 the college expanded, student numbers increasing by 112%.

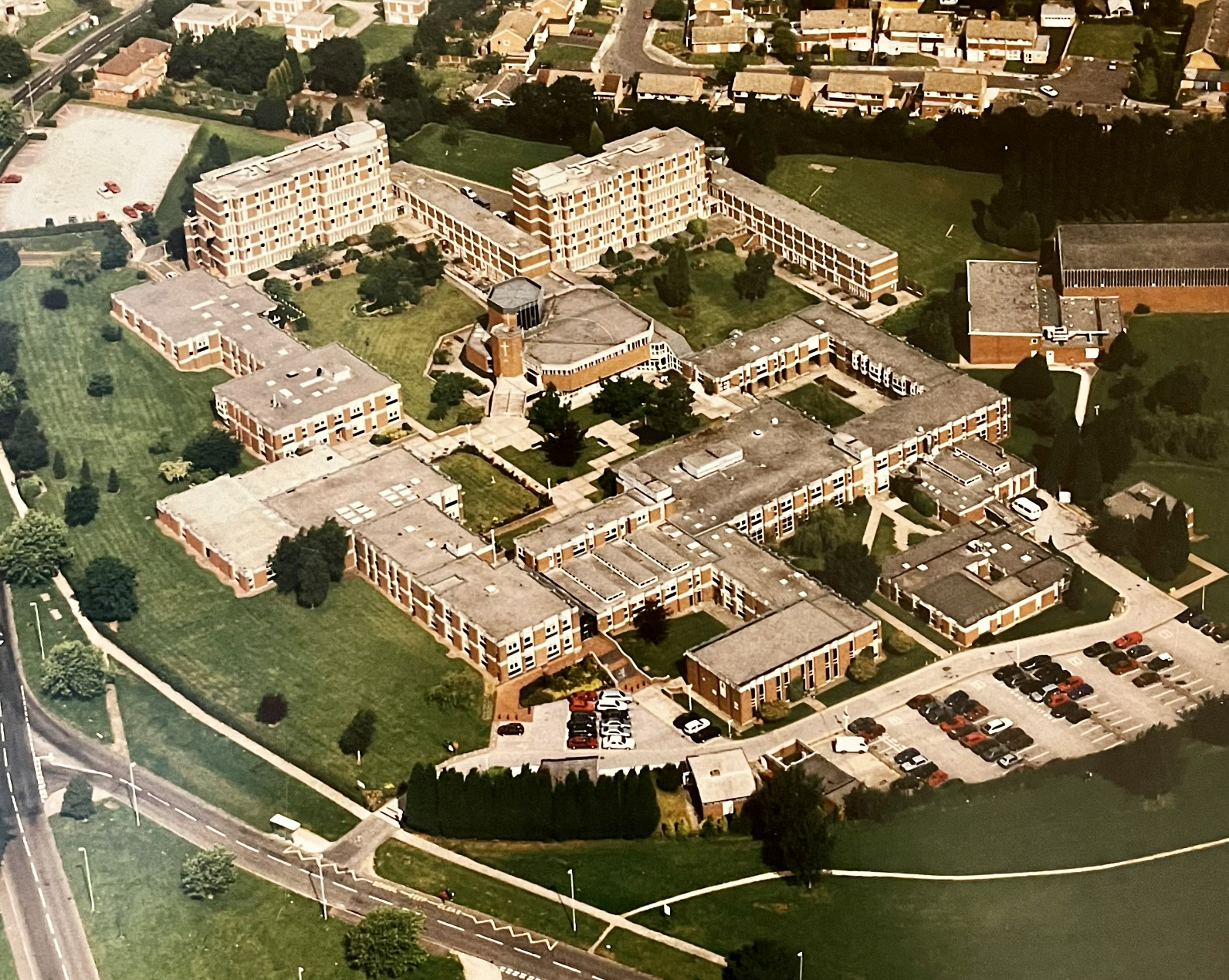
Newman College of Higher Education Campus, c. 1998

Originally called Newman College of Higher Education, the college was established as a centre for the training of teachers for local primary and secondary schools. The institution changed its name to Newman University College in January 2008, to Newman University in 2013 and to Birmingham Newman University in 2023. Upon receiving university status, then principal, Professor Peter Lutzeier, commented "it has been a long road to get here but achieving full university status provides welcome recognition for the quality of Newman's courses, graduates and staff".

=== Tier 4 visa controversy ===
In April 2017 Newman University's licence to recruit and teach overseas students was revoked. Vice-Chancellor, Scott Davidson, commented on the government's decision in an article in the Times Higher Education Supplement. Professor Davidson noted how "As a smaller university, we issued less than 20 CASs over the last 12 months, meaning just two rejections was enough to trigger the 10% threshold. This is in contrast with larger universities, which may have several hundred CAS refusals before the 10% threshold is crossed." The university noted its commitment to regaining Tier 4 powers as soon as possible. An industry observer, Jack Grove, commented that the revocation of the university's Tier 4 licence was a 'ridiculous decision'.

=== 50th anniversary, 2018 ===
In 2018 the university started a year of celebrations to mark the fiftieth anniversary of its foundation. On 13 February 2018 the Vice Chancellor, Professor Scott Davidson, opened the year of events with a drinks reception at the Bartley Green campus. Davidson told visitors

It’s incredible to look back over our evolution since we first opened our doors in 1968 as a teacher training college. Whilst we still have a strong reputation within that field, I’m proud that we are now able to offer a range of undergraduate, postgraduate and foundation degree courses and welcome students and staff of all religions.

In attendance were local business leaders, former students and the Archbishop of Birmingham, Bernard Longley. The university called on its former students to share their memories in an online campaign. As part of the celebrations, the university hosted the Cathedrals Group Choirs Festival. Rehearsals took place in the university chapel while the final performance was held in Birmingham Symphony Hall.

The university's "big alumni reunion" was scheduled for August 2018.

== Student population ==
In 2005 nearly half of the institution's students were from low-participation groups and 28% from low-participation neighbourhoods. In 2016, according to an analysis in The Sunday Times, Newman had the third highest working class intake, and the second highest state school intake, of all universities in the UK. The same survey showed that 1 in 3 of Newman's students is a mature student.

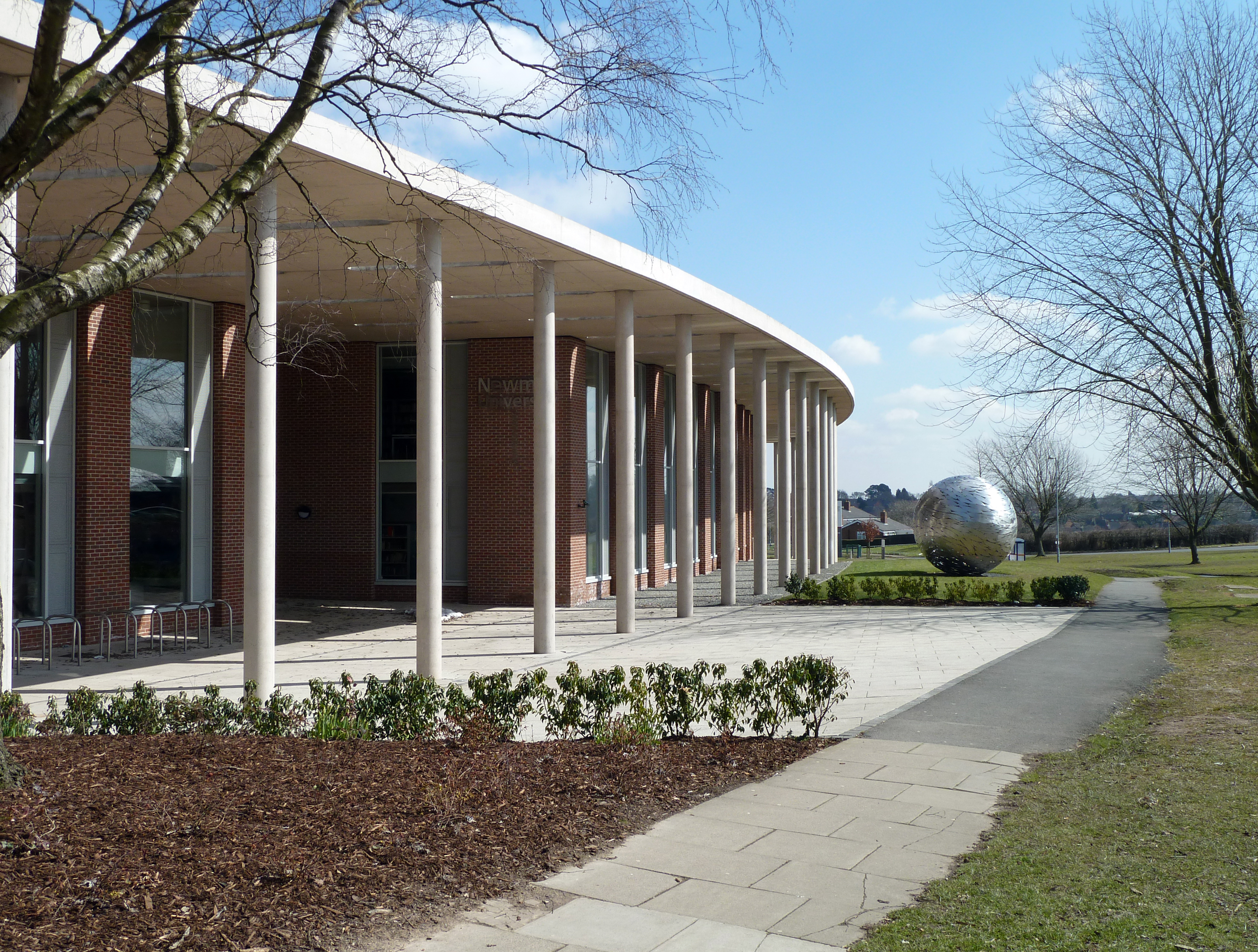
Birmingham Newman University, Library

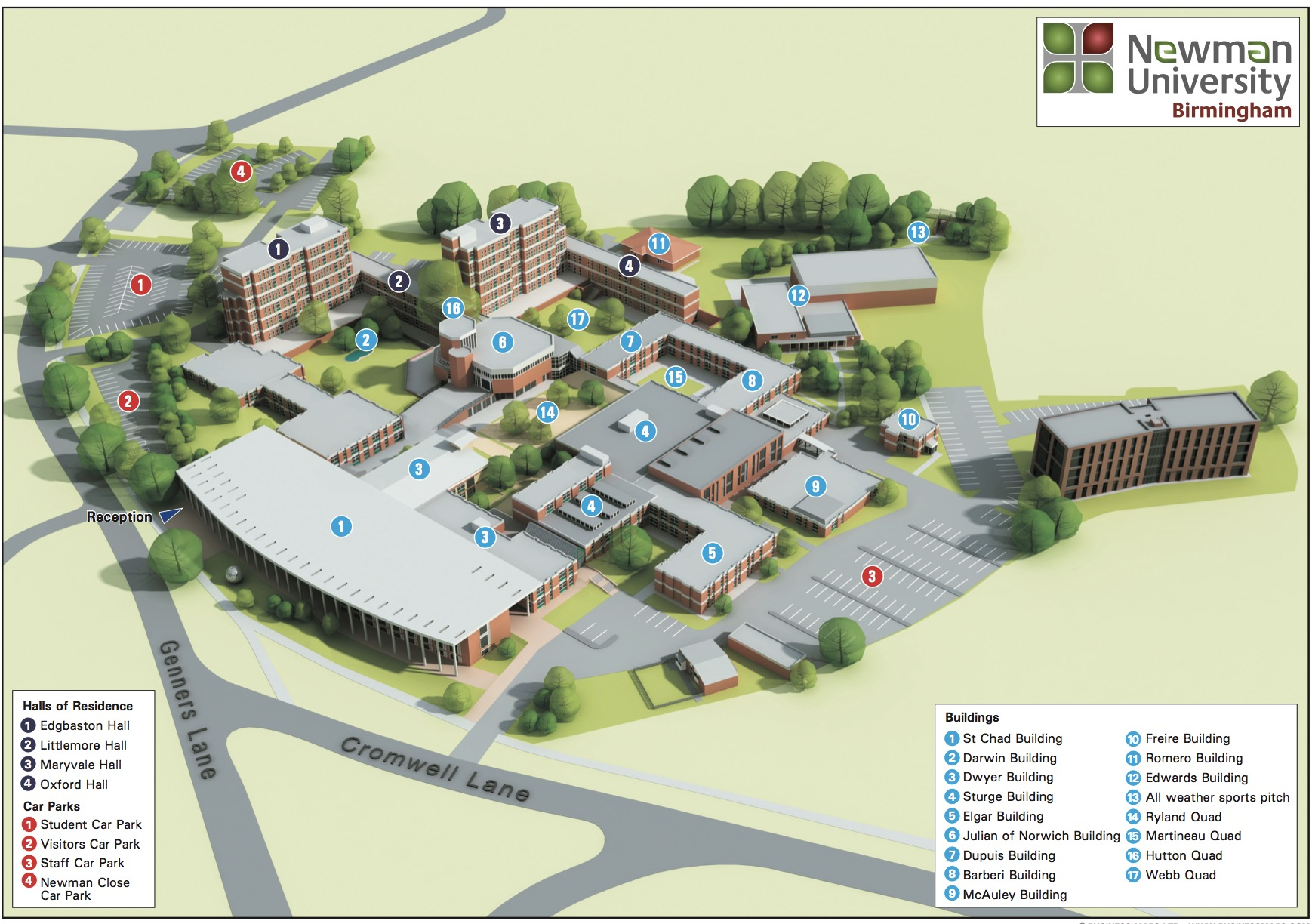
Map of Birmingham Newman University

== Campus ==
The university campus is located in Bartley Green about 8 miles (12.9 km) south-west of the city centre. It overlooks the Bartley Reservoir.

The campus is designed around a series of inner quadrangles near academic, administrative, and pastoral buildings. The buildings on campus are named after people with a local historical significance and/or an educational significance to Birmingham Newman University. The quads are named after women who have made a significant contribution to Birmingham and the Halls of Residence are named after places of significance to John Henry Newman. Much of the Campus dates back to the original foundation of the college in the 1960s interspersed with more recent developments.

See a campus map for 2024 here: https://www.newman.ac.uk/wp-content/uploads/sites/10/2024/07/Birmingham-Newman-University-3D-V18B-1.pdf

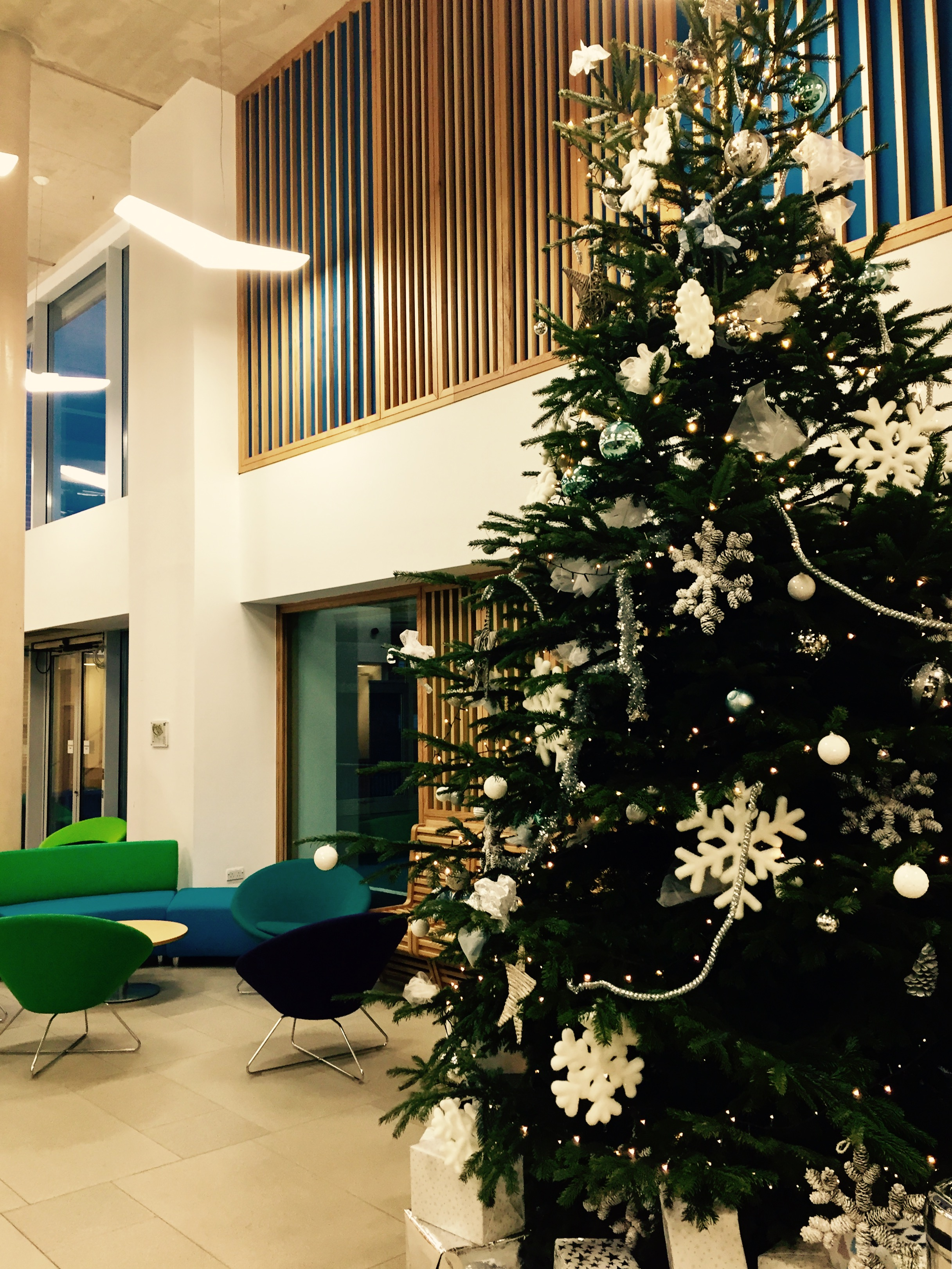
Christmas 2016, Atrium, Newman University, Birmingham

Birmingham Newman University, Campus

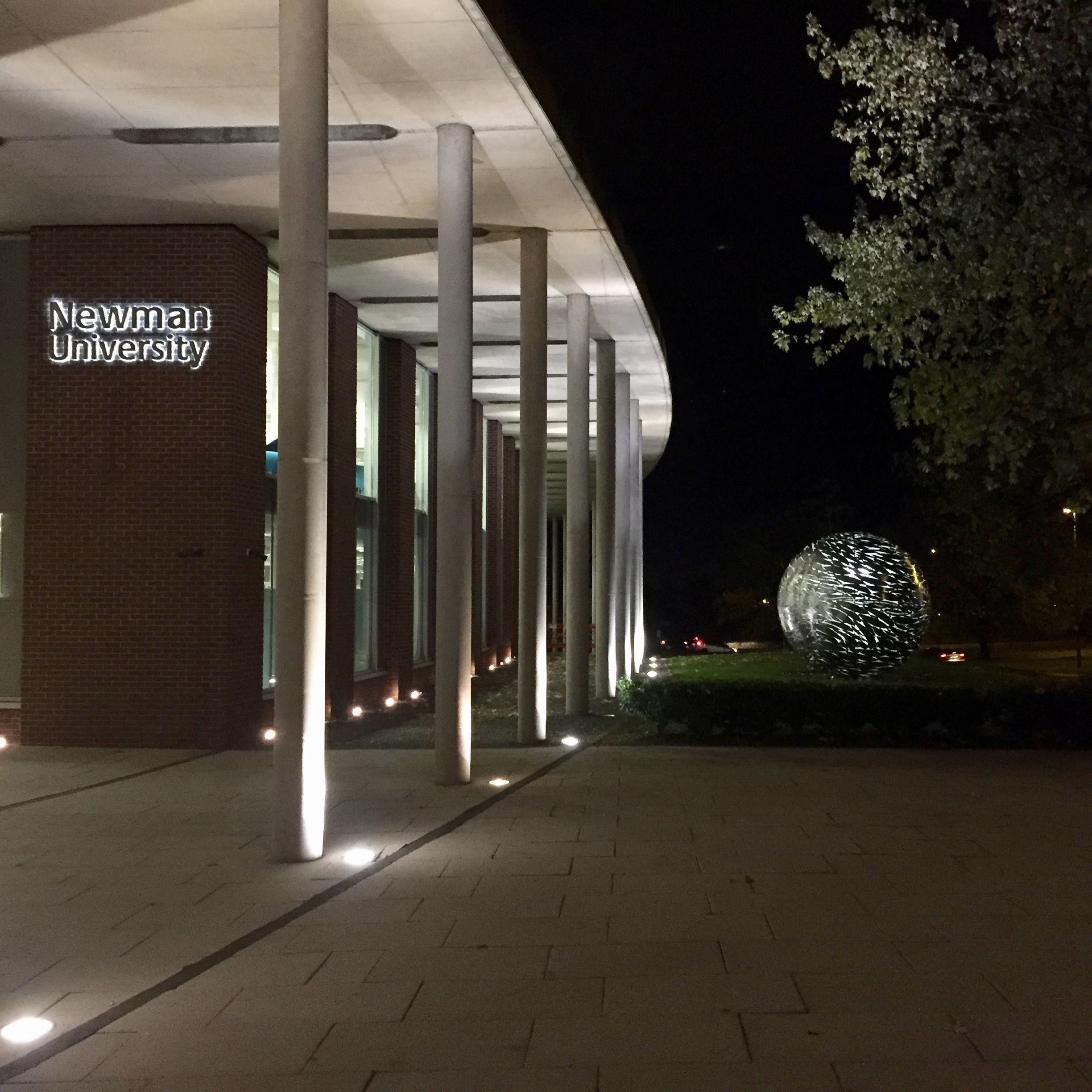
St Chad's Building

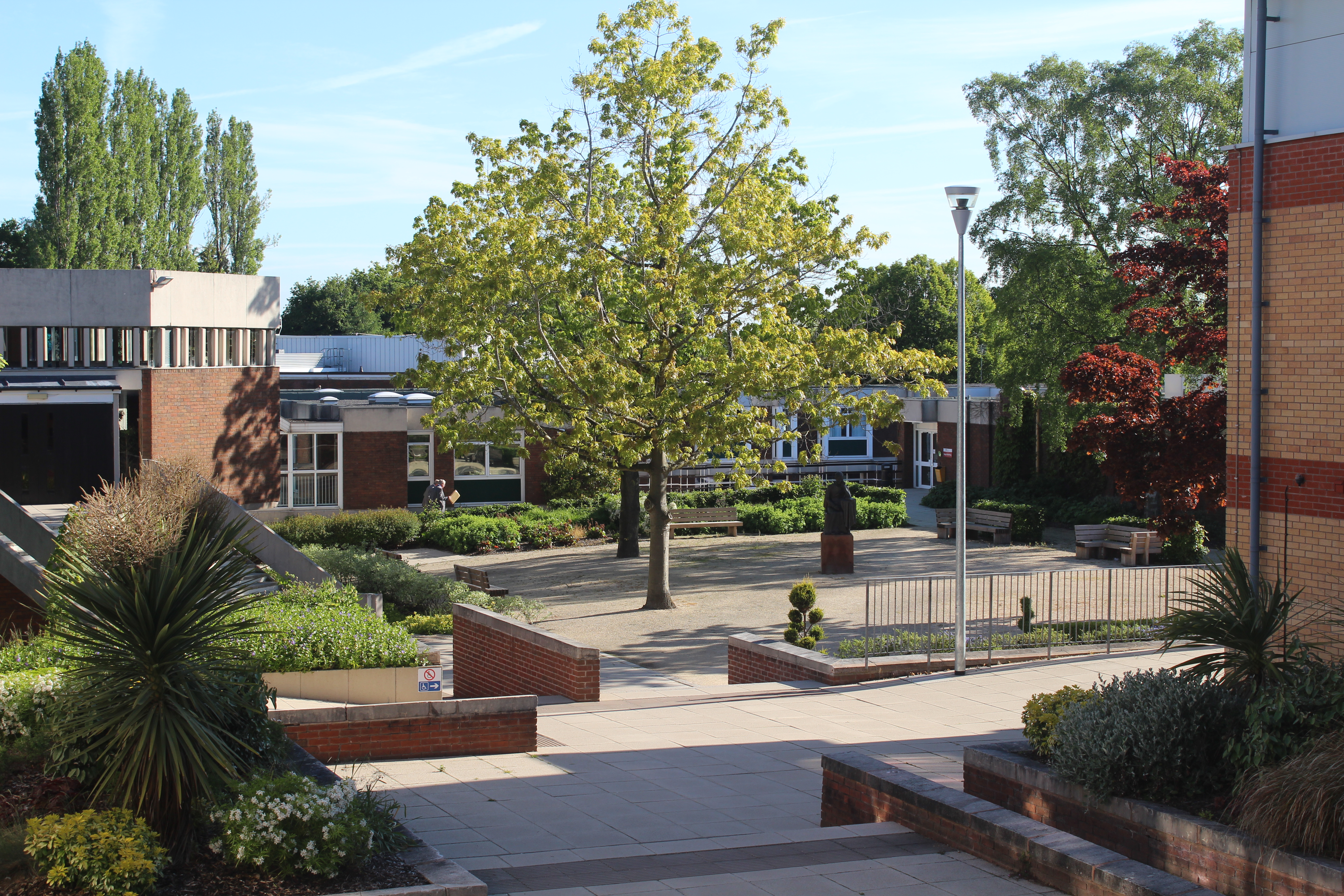
Campus Quad

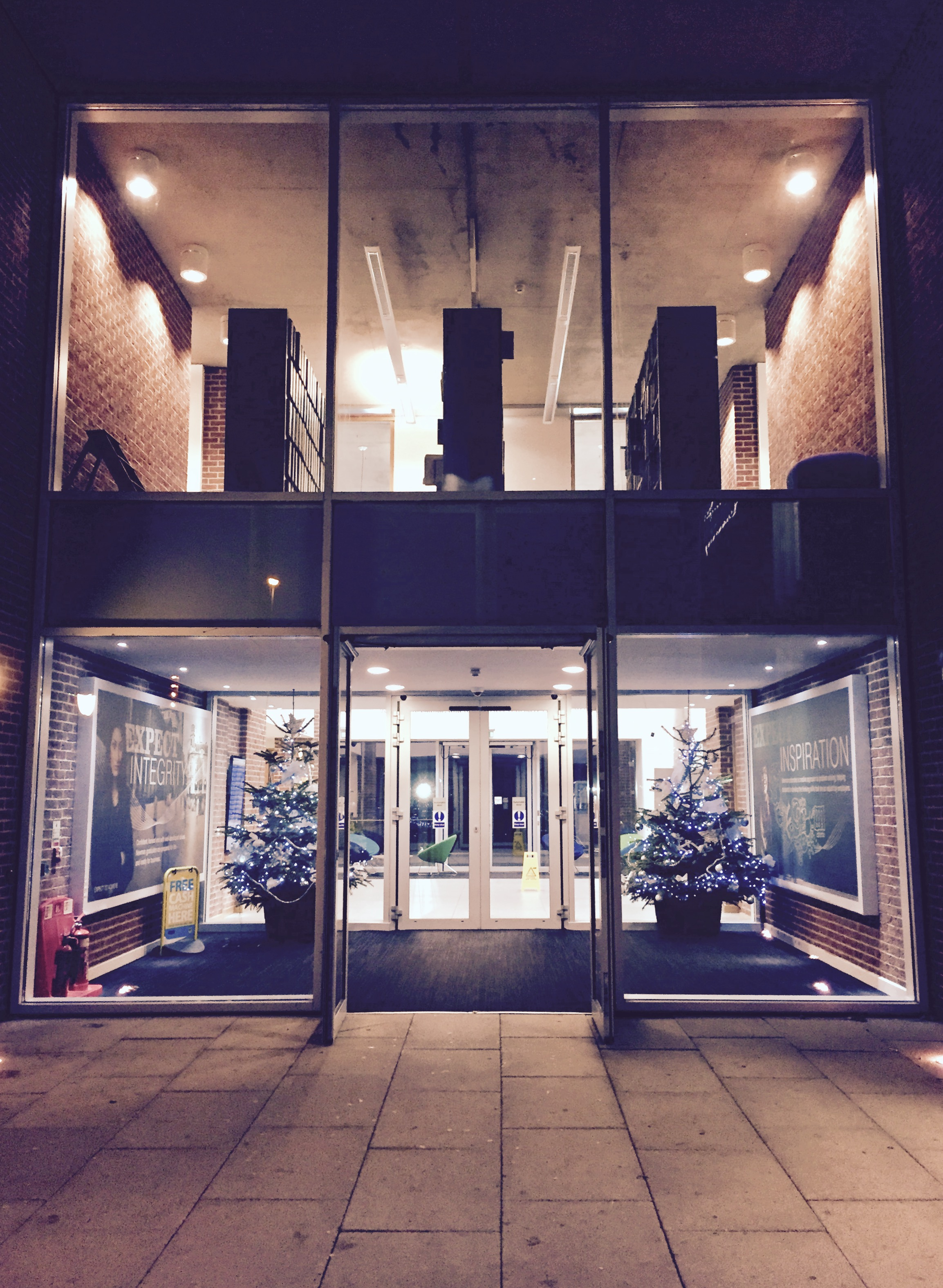
St Chad Building and Library

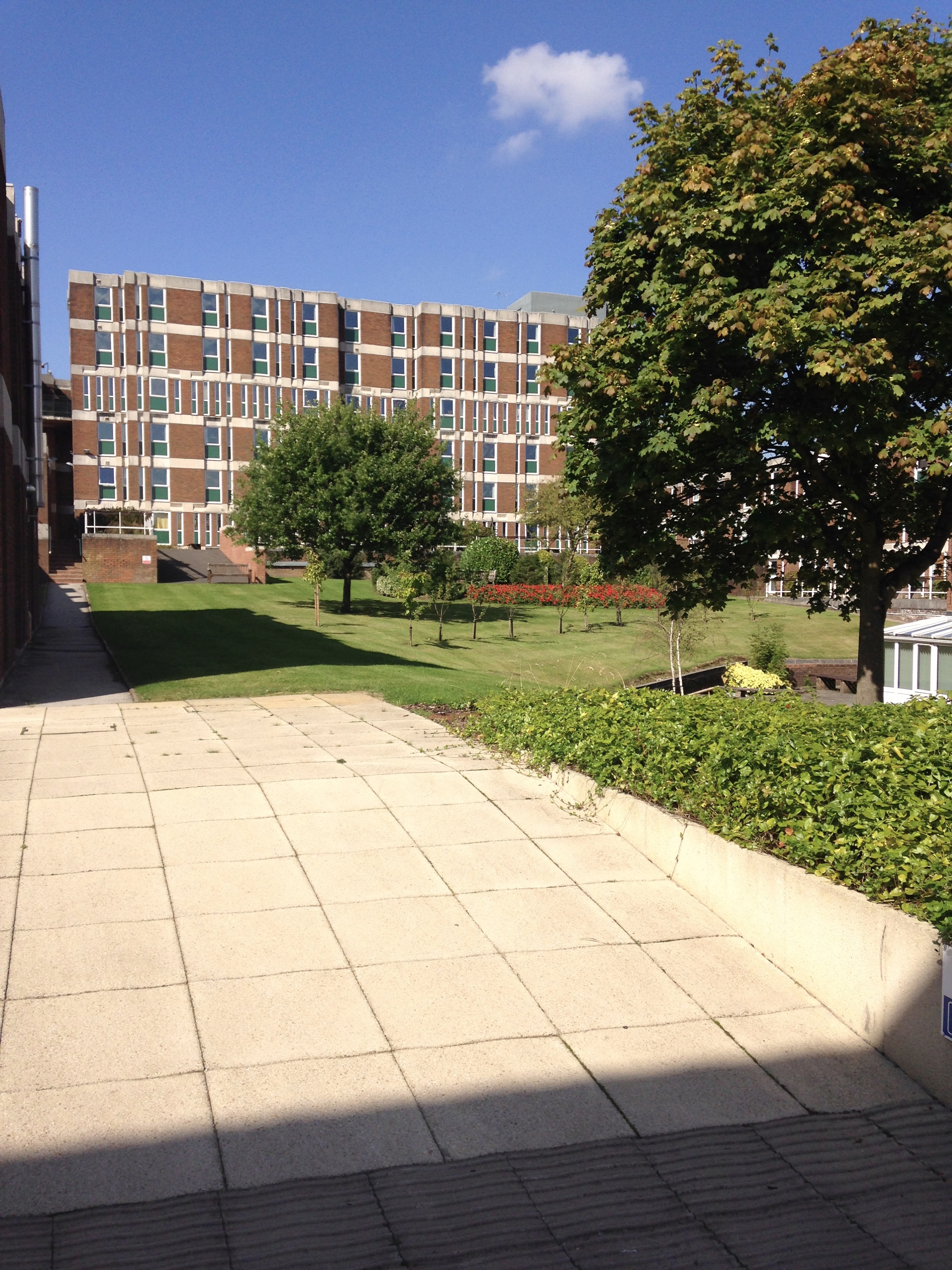
Halls of Residence

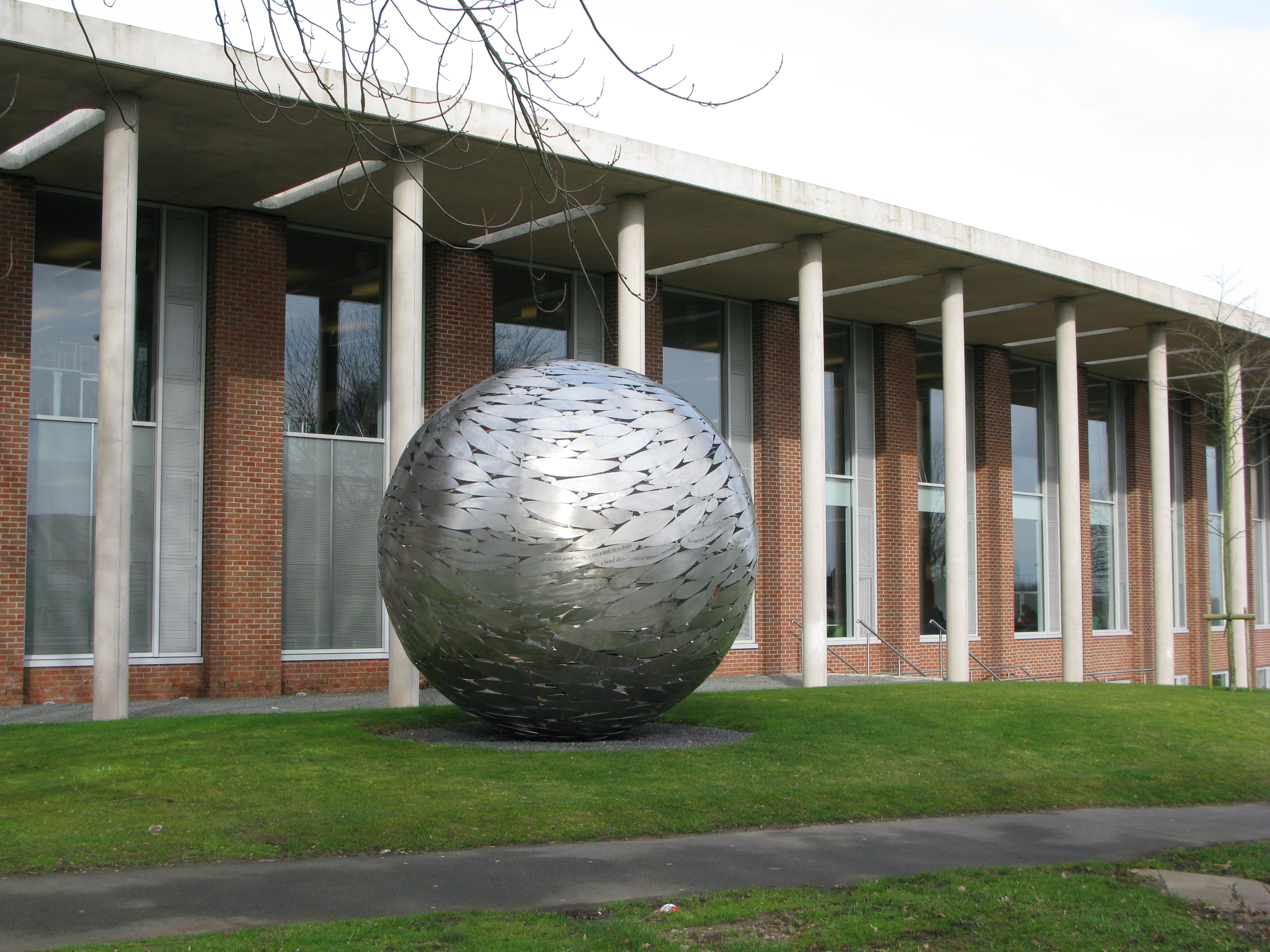
The Globe

St Mary's Chapel is located in the middle of the campus and offers chaplaincy support to those of any faith and spaces for religious exercise or contemplation. In 2016, the chapel was refurbished and a large extension added to the south side of the building to provide additional teaching spaces.

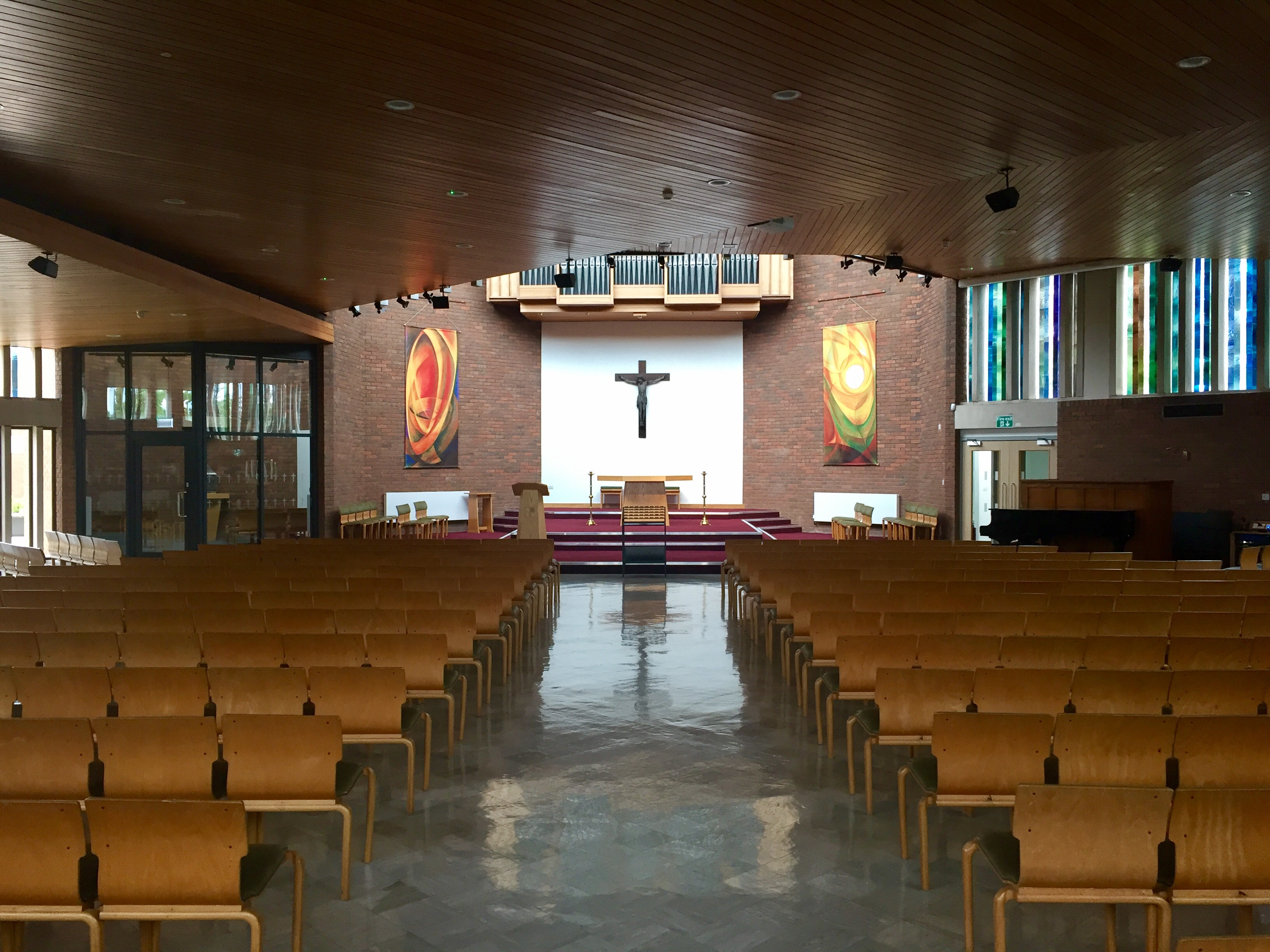
St Mary's Chapel interior

Students have a number of choices for where to eat on Campus in addition to shops and takeaway restaurants on Genners Lane. The Sanctuary acts as the main refectory where hot and cold meals are served throughout the day. The Senses Bar is on the northern side of the campus. The Atrium cafe serves Starbucks coffee and other snacks on the south side of campus.

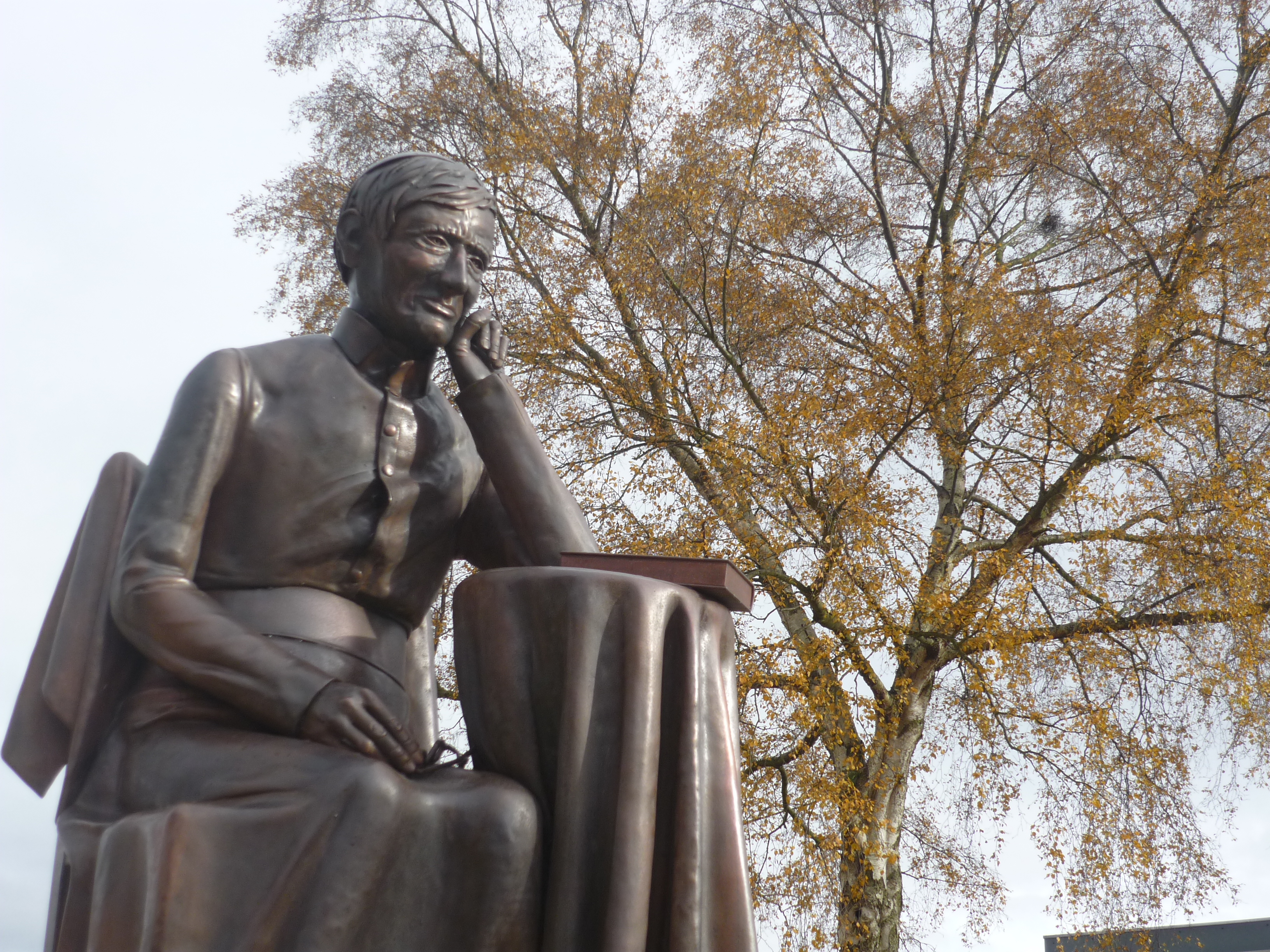
Statue of John Henry Newman

In 2013, the university invested £20 million in developing parts of the campus, including a new library and entrance named the St Chad Building. These were opened by Olympic athlete Kristian Thomas and nominated for the Education category BD Architect of the Year Award, 2012.

In September 2014 and 2017, the university received the Gold Award for Eco Campus.

At the north side of the Campus is the Newman Health and Wellbeing Centre. Opened in 2016, the centre offers counselling services to students and local residents as well as a range of outreach activities.

The new 104-room Cofton Halls of Residence were completed at the end of 2017.

=== Sports facilities ===
Newman's Sports Centre is situated in the Edwards Building at the northern edge of the Campus. The gymnasium is complete with a full cardio and sports performance suite with two Olympic lifting platforms. The centre has squash and badminton court facilities. All facilities are open to the local community as well as students and staff from the university.

Beyond the centre, there is a third-generation all-weather pitch that was originally opened in 2008 and then upgraded in April 2017. The pitch was officially opened by former Aston Villa and England striker Darius Vassell and Premier League official and Newman alumna Sian Massey-Ellis. The pitch was part of a collaboration between the university and the Football Foundation to increase local participation in sports.

The sports hall plays host to the university sports teams and is sometimes used as an examination venue.

=== Campus art ===
The campus has a number of artworks. A piece entitled 'The Globe', designed by Planet Art in nearby West Bromwich, was installed outside of the new library building in May 2012. 'The Globe' includes quotations from John Henry Newman on faithfulness and commitment. A statue of John Henry Newman, designed and created by Tim Tolkien, is in the Ryland Quad of the campus.

=== Campus Development ===
In 2016, the local council approved the first phase of the university's new Campus development plan. Phase one included a £22 million investment in a new hall of residence, teaching block, social spaces and coffee bar. The accommodation blocks are designed as a ribbon of buildings that respond to the natural sweep of the eastern boundary. The new teaching block includes a new lecture theatre, seminar rooms and atrium.

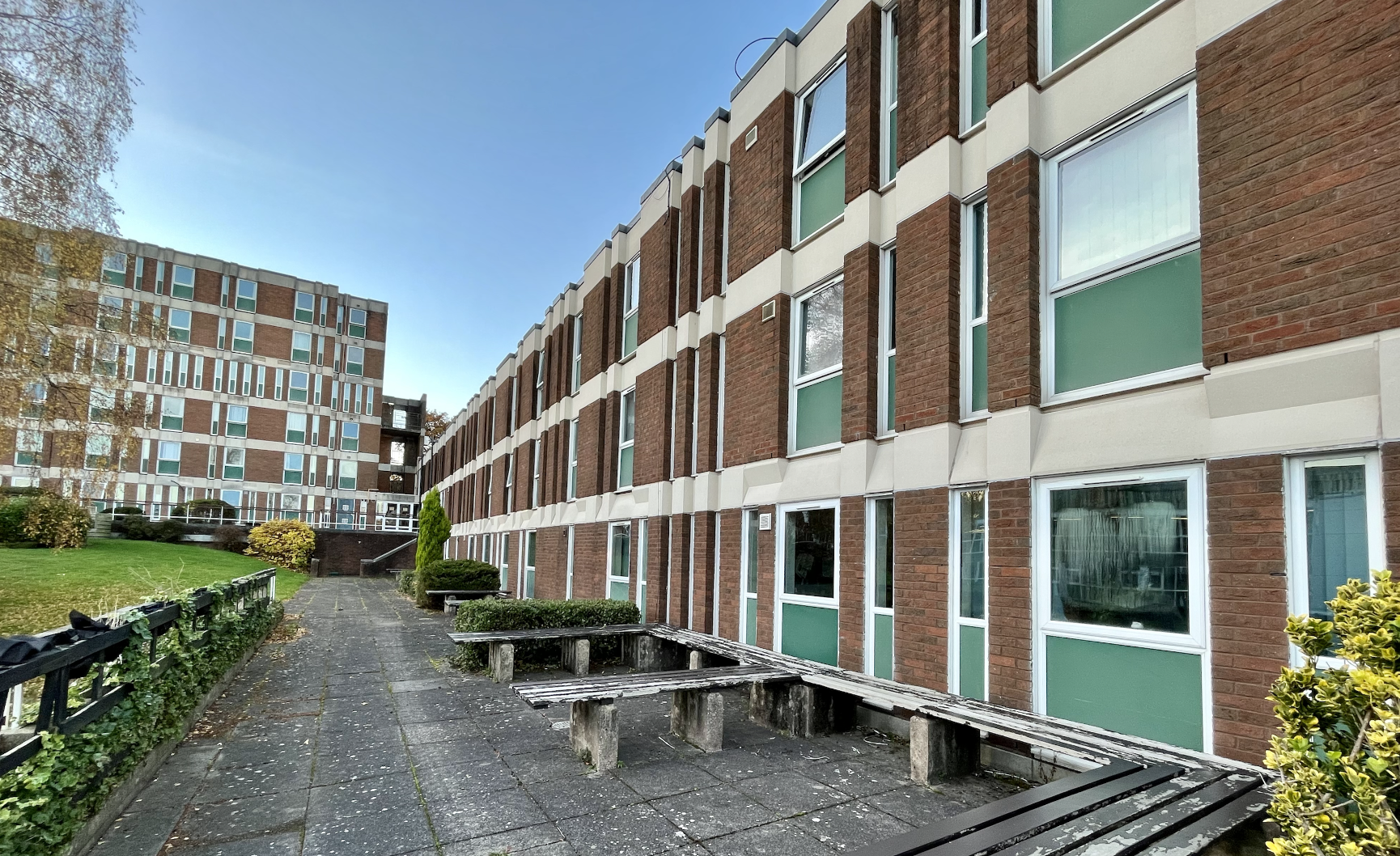
Academic Offices in Oxford Hall

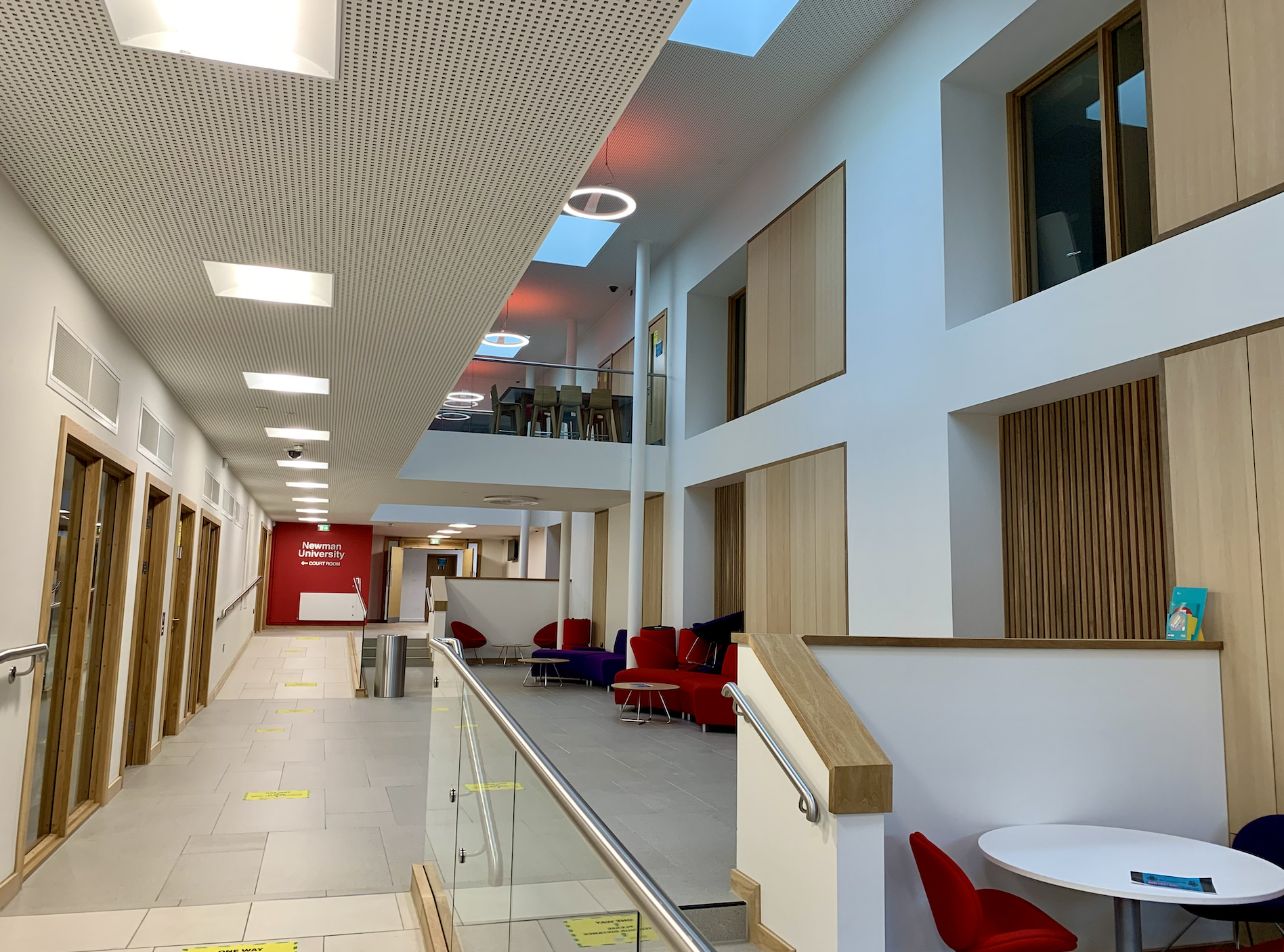
Atrium, St Hilda Building

The total development, costing £70m, was the subject of an argument between local councillors. Fiona Williams (Lab) criticised the generic nature of the building designs. She stated 'we seem to be having a lot of off-the-shelf design in the city. We need a little more imagination'. Her rival, Douglas Osborn (Con) defended the designs claiming 'the site has character...any extras would end up being paid for by the young people through the fees'. One council official claimed the designs were 'crisp and modern' and in keeping with surrounding buildings.

In 2021, the university began work developing teaching spaces for new courses in Nursing.

== Organisation and structure ==
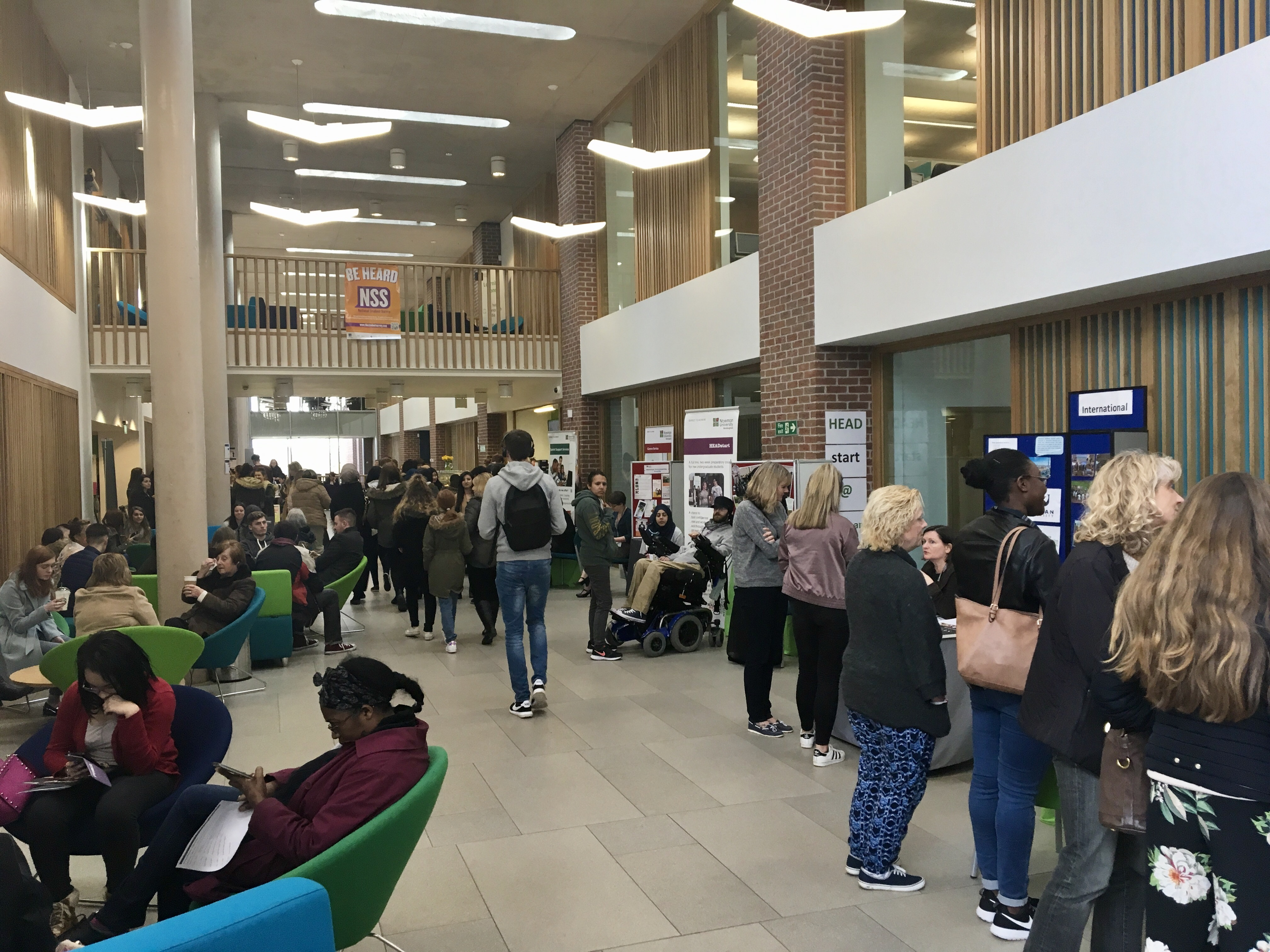
Open Day, 2017, St Chad Atrium, Newman University, Birmingham

The university is governed by the University Council and the Senate, while day-to-day running is by the university leadership team.

The university is divided into four faculties:

- School of Arts, Humanities and Human Sciences (AHHS)
- School of Business and Law (B&L)
- School of Nursing and Allied Health (NAH)
- School of Education

== Finances ==
In 2021, the university's income was £24.1m with an expenditure of £22.1m. Student fees from UK undergraduate and postgraduate students represented £19.4m of the university's income that year.

== Academic profile ==
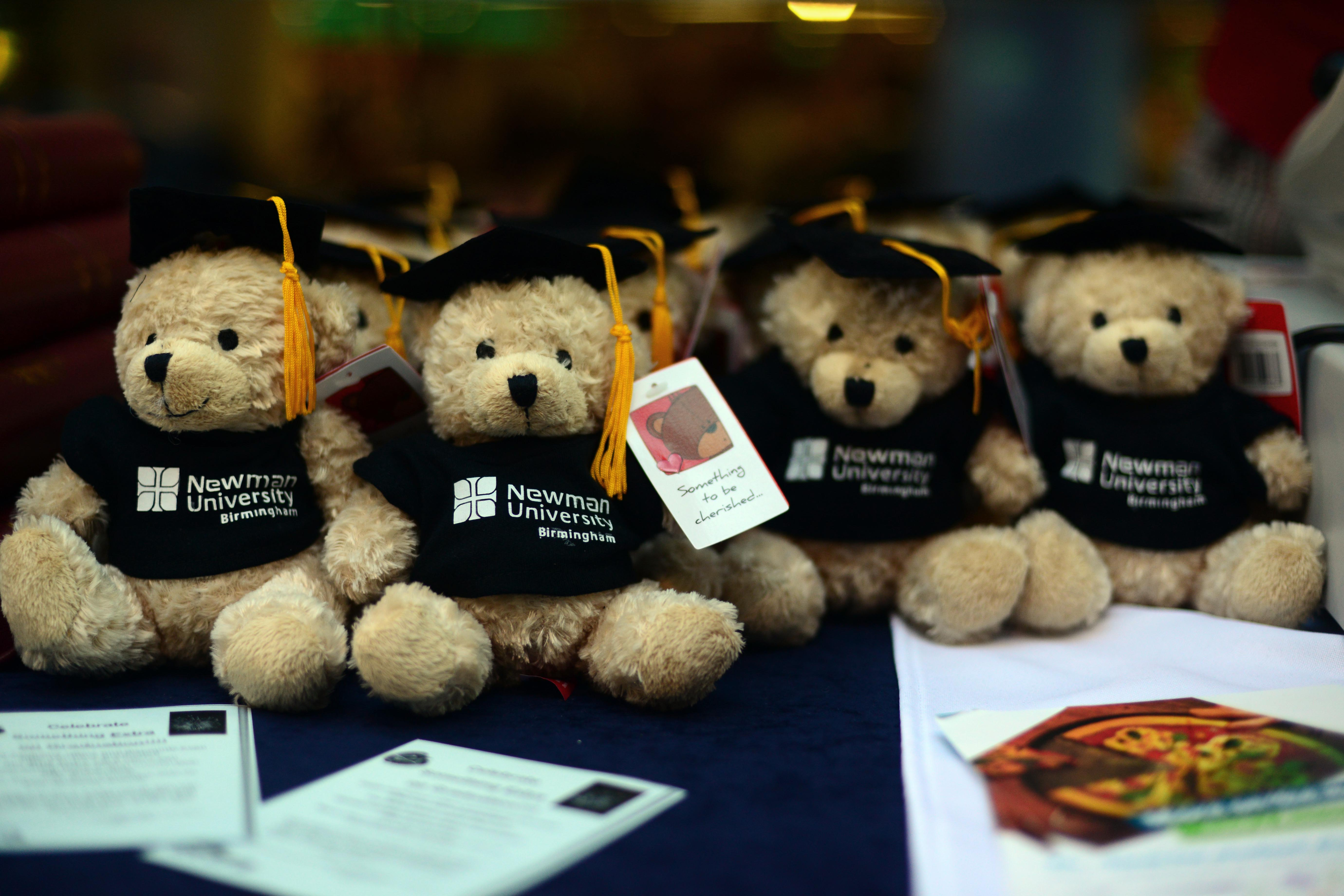
Graduate bears, Birmingham Newman University

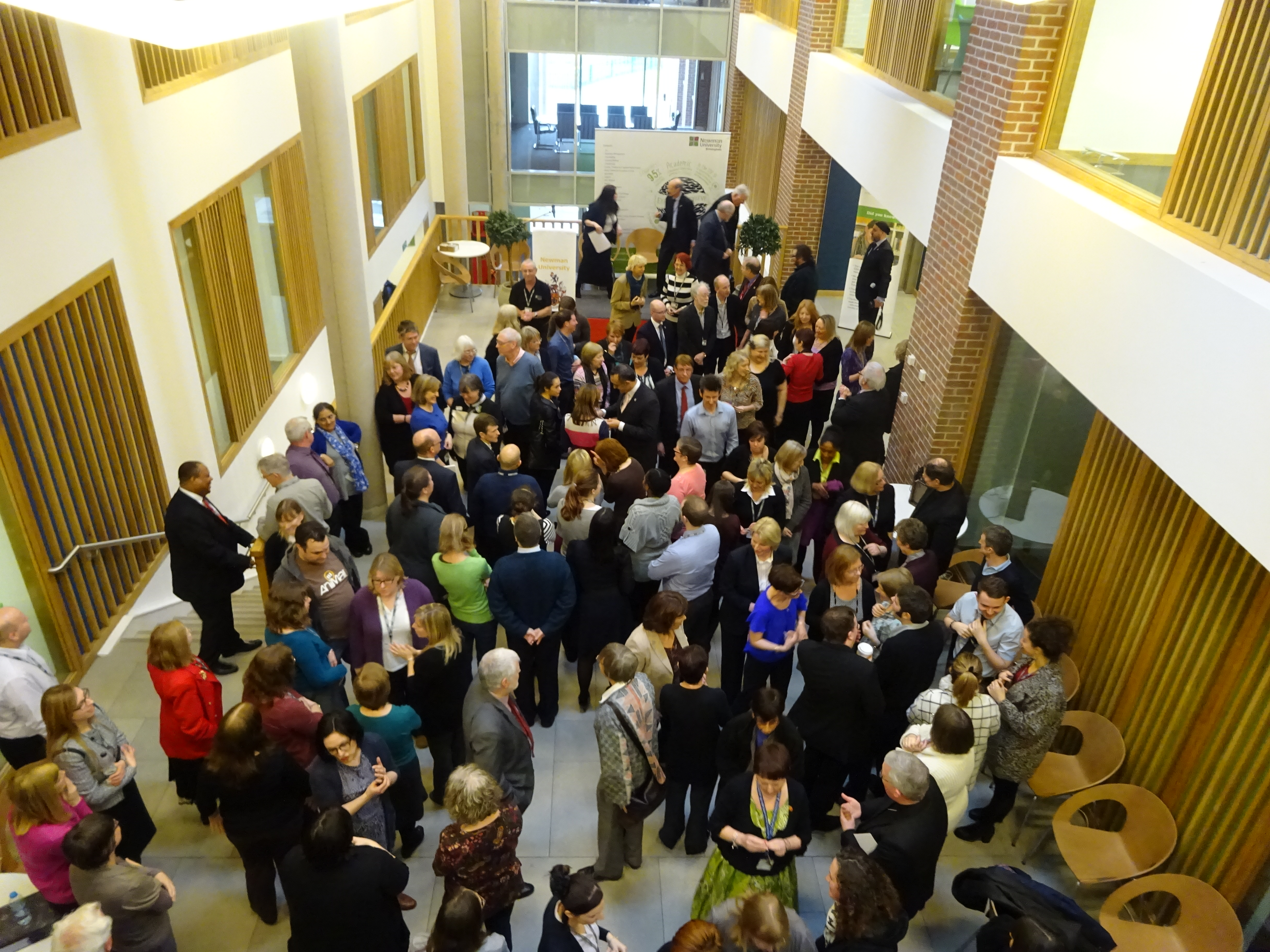
Foundation Day Celebrations, 2015

Newman was given taught degree awarding powers in September 2007 and full university status in 2013. In It offers a wide range of undergraduate and postgraduate degree programmes. In 2016/17, over three quarters of the undergraduate student population at the university was female (2,180 out of a total of 2,830).

The university offers degrees in a wide range of subjects and continues to offer teacher training courses. Initial Teacher Education (ITE) is available at both undergraduate level and through the Postgraduate Certificate in Education as well as taught and research-based postgraduate degrees.

Since inception in 1968 over 13,500 teacher training students have gained qualified teacher status or the equivalent.

The university awards postgraduate research degrees (MPhil and PhD) in affiliation with Liverpool Hope University.

In 2014, the university was awarded £1.8 million to establish the Science and Religion: Exploring the Spectrum Centre. The university secured another tranche of funding from HEFCE to explore innovation in the Higher Education sector.

== Reputation and rankings ==
Rankings
National rankings
- Complete (2027): 124
- Guardian (2026): 71
- Times / Sunday Times (2026): 90=

Newman University is the fourth ranked of the five universities in Birmingham according to the Complete University Guide, below the University of Birmingham, Aston University, and Birmingham City University.

The university has a consistently high graduate employment rate of around ninety to ninety-five per cent.

Newman was one of only fifteen universities to be awarded a 'High' ranking in the first Which? University Guide. In June 2014, the university was named the safest university for students in Birmingham by the Independent's Complete University Guide. The Student Support was nominated for the 'Outstanding Student Services Team' award at the Times Higher Education Awards in 2017.

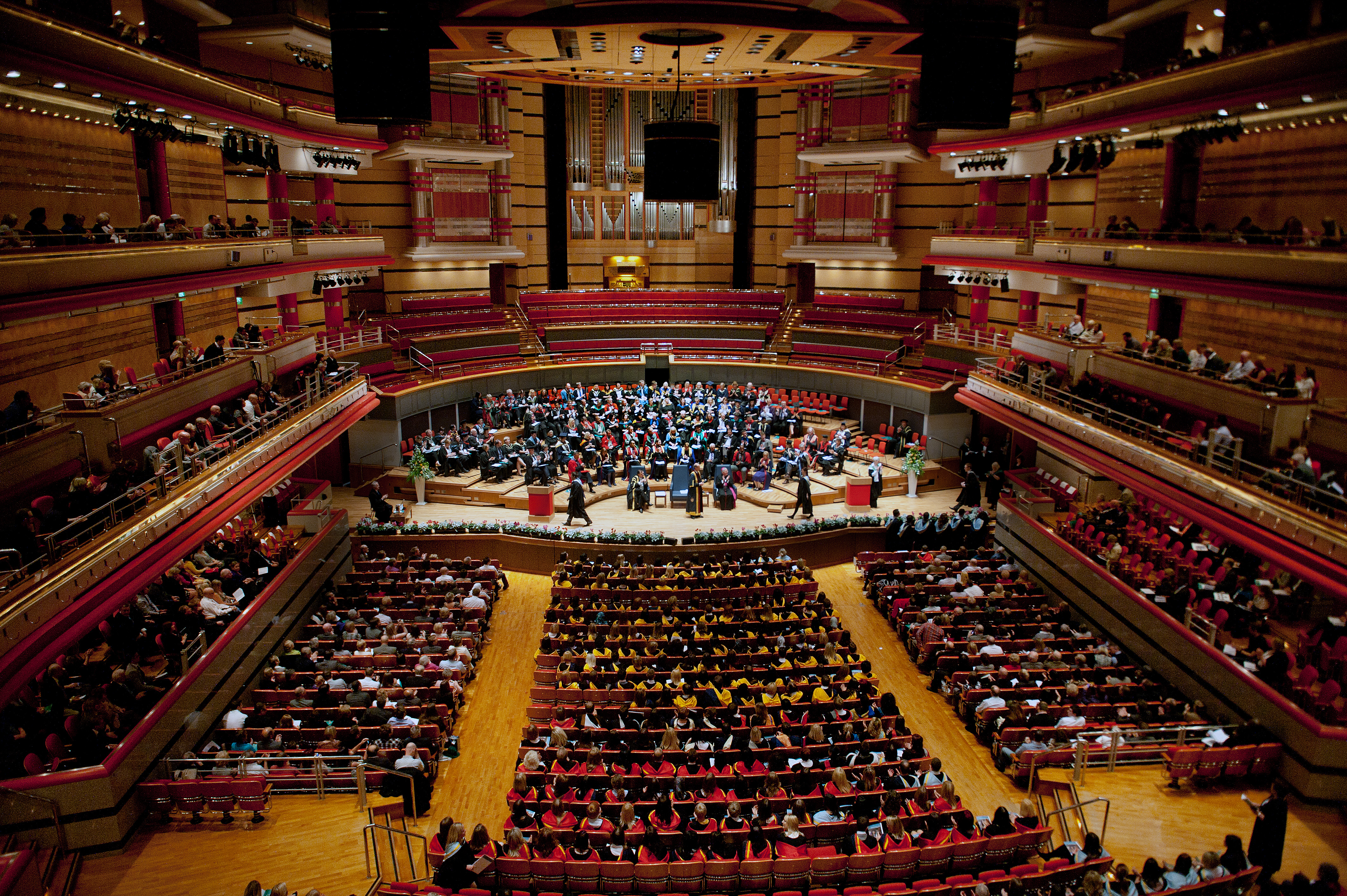
Newman University Graduation, 2011, Symphony Hall, Birmingham

Newman University's teacher training courses received a Good in the most recent Ofsted inspection. Many of the university's courses are recognised by professional bodies such as the Chartered Management Institute, BASES and British Psychological Society.

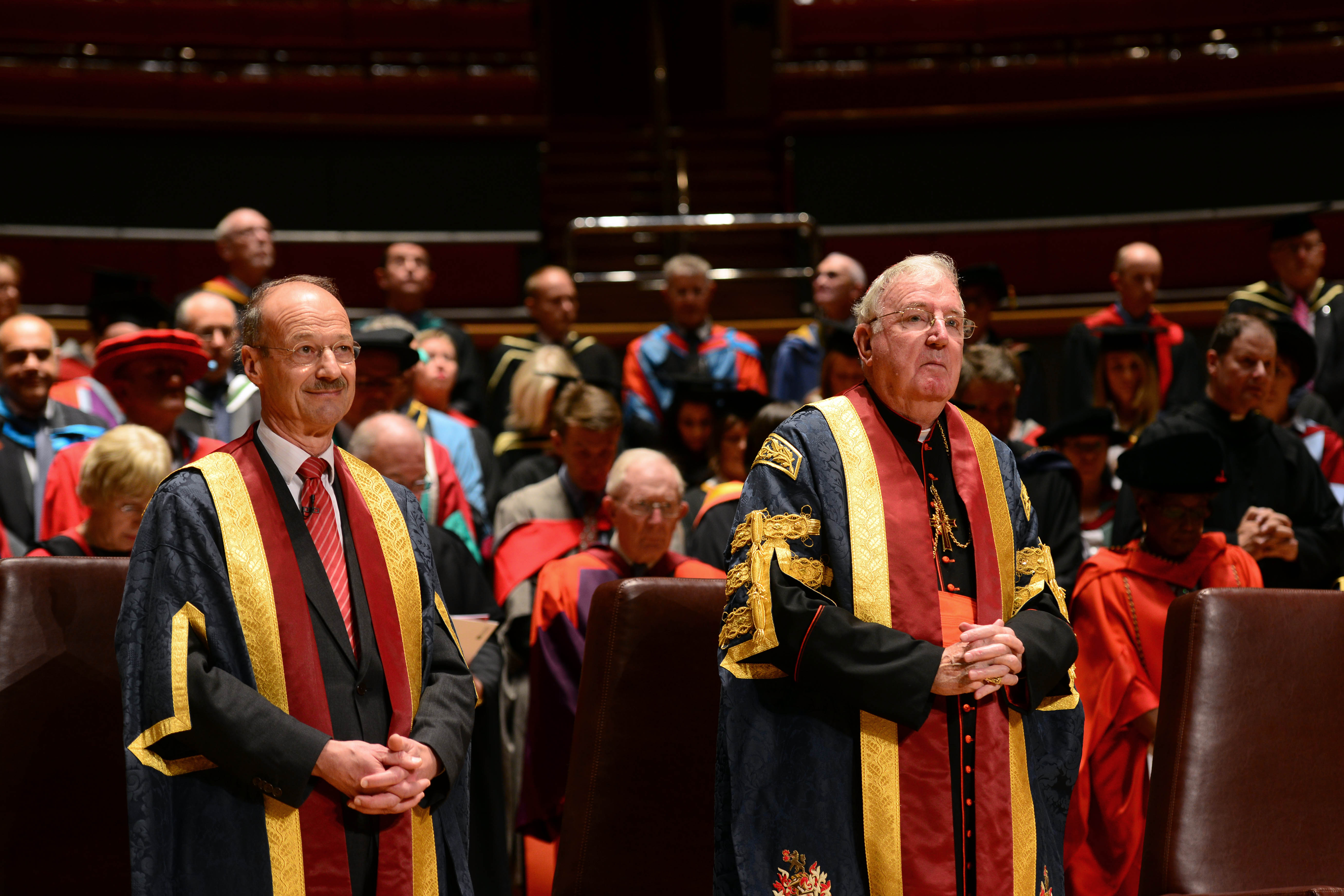
Professor Peter Lutzeier and Cardinal Cormac Murphy-O'Connor at Graduation, 2014

=== National Student Survey (NSS) ===
In 2019, Newman was 1st in Birmingham and 4th in the West Midlands for overall student satisfaction. In 2015, Newman was in the top 25 institutions in the UK for overall satisfaction. In addition, Drama, English Studies and History all scored 100% for 'Overall Satisfaction' and were rated number 1 in the country in their subject areas.

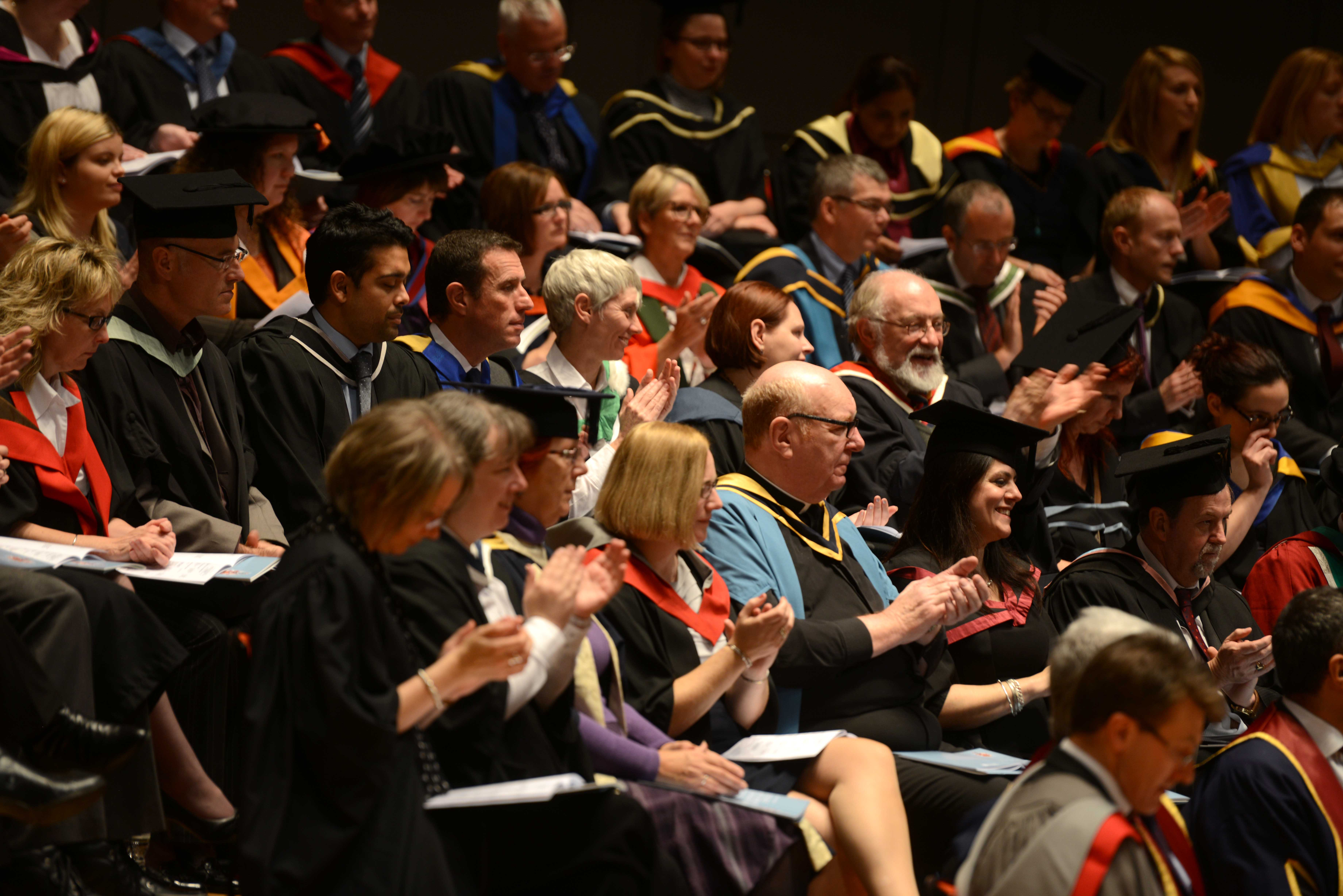
Academic Staff, Graduation, 2014, Symphony Hall, Birmingham

=== Teaching Excellence Framework ===
In the UK government's new teaching assessment exercise, released in June 2017, Newman was awarded a Silver award for its teaching standards. In a mock-TEF exercise performed by the Times Higher Education Supplement, Newman University ranked in ninety-first place and scored strongly on its overall student satisfaction scores (89%).

=== Research Excellence Framework ===
The university has a growing research profile. In 2008, Education, Sport-Related Studies and History made submissions to the Research Assessment Exercise. Most research was found to be 'recognised internationally in terms of originality, significance and rigour'. The university asserted its intention to grow its research profile prior to the next research assessment by attracting 'more staff with an established research interest and publication history and young academics with potential to evolve a significant research profile'. The university made a full submission to the 2014 Research Excellence Framework (REF).

In the university's strategic plan document in 2014, the university committed itself to 'focus investment on securing a critical mass of academic staff who are engaged in research, practice, or other forms of advanced scholarship' and to 'expand research income streams'.

The university is home to six research centres: the Centre for Science, Knowledge, Belief and Society; the Children, Young People and Family Research Research Centre; the Humanities Research Centre; Newman Research Centre for the Bible and its Reception; Newman Institute of Leadership in Education and the Sport, Physical Activity and Health Research Centre.

== Events ==
=== Visit of Mother Teresa, 1992 ===
On 9 September 1992, Mother Teresa visited the college campus with Cardinal Basil Hume and greeted students and staff.

=== 40th anniversary thanksgiving, 2008 ===
On 21 February 2008, the University College celebrated its fortieth anniversary. The Most Reverend Vincent Nichols presided over the celebration mass in St Mary's Chapel. Staff celebrated the anniversary at the nearby Botanical Gardens.

=== Papal Visit, 2012 ===
Students and staff from the university participated in a ceremonial mass held by Pope Benedict XVI at Cofton Park, Birmingham in 2012.

=== Honorary doctorates ===
The university has awarded honorary doctorates to a number of public figures and intellectuals including John Sentamu, Eamon Duffy and Edward Bond.

== See also ==
- Armorial of UK universities
- College of Education
- List of universities in the UK
