= Crest Boys' Academy =

Crest Boys' Academyv
- Crest Boys' Academy Logo

Location
- Crest Road; Neasden, Greater London, NW2 7SN; England; 51.56297°N 0.24147°W

Information
- Type: Academy
- Motto: Excellence in Education for All
- Established: 2009
- Founders: E-ACT, John Hall
- Closed: 2014
- Department for Education URN: 135974 Tables
- Ofsted: Reports
- Principal Director: Elroy Cahill
- Gender: Boys
- Age: 11 to 19
- Enrolment: 585
- Houses: Pythagoras, Galellio, Armadeus, Newton
- Colours: Black, purple and white
- Website: http://www.thecrestboysacademy.org.uk/

The Crest Boys' Academy (formerly John Kelly Boys' Technology College) was a secondary school with academy status located in Neasden in the London borough of Brent. The school was founded as John Kelly Boys' School in 1958 and was set on pleasant and extensive grounds. The school was served by a number of bus routes (332, 245, 182, 16) and was close to Neasden and Dollis Hill Underground stations.

John Kelly Boys' Technology College turned into an academy on 1 September 2009, and became Crest Boys' Academy (sponsored by E-ACT). The school was situated next to Crest Girls' Academy; the schools shared a sixth form.

Due to concerns regarding the quality of education at both Crest Boys’ Academy and Crest Girls’ Academy following grading of Satisfactory by Ofsted, an Executive Principal Phil Hearne was appointed to lead both schools. An Ofsted report in June 2013 placed the school in special measures, stating that it offered an inadequate standard of education. In October 2013 Billy O’Keeffe, the Head of School resigned. In April 2014 a new Principal Director Elroy Cahill was appointed. The Academy underwent a restructuring with new teaching and leadership appointments to drive forward standards. The Crest Boys' Academy merged with the Crest Girls' Academy and Crest Sixth Form to become E-ACT Crest Academy, which moved into a new £40,000,000 building in September 2014.

== Notable former pupils ==
- Brinsley Forde, musician for Aswad and actor
- Mike Gatting, former Middlesex and England international cricketer, attended JKBTC
- Steve Gatting, former Arsenal and Brighton footballer, attended JKBTC
- Ricky Hill, former Luton Town and England international footballer, attended JKBTC
- Arthur Ted Powell, advertising art director and artist, attended JKBTC
- Graham Young, serial killer, the notorious 'Teacup Poisoner'
