= Crest Girls' Academy =

Former secondary school in Neasden

The Crest Girls Academy

Location
- Crest Road; Neasden, Greater London, NW2 7SN; England
- Coordinates: 51.5634°N 0.2419°W

Information
- Type: Academy
- Motto: Excellence in Education for All
- Established: 1958
- Closed: 2014
- Ofsted: Reports
- Executive Principal: Phil Hearne
- Principal Director of Academies: Fiona Deegan
- Gender: Girls
- Age: 11 to 19
- Colours: Purple, Black and White
- Website: http://www.thecrestgirlsacademy.org.uk/

The Crest Girls' Academy, formerly known as John Kelly Girls' Technology College, was a girls' secondary school with academy status located in Neasden, Brent, North West London. The school was situated next to Crest Boys' Academy; the schools shared a sixth form. All three schools were amalgamated into E-ACT Crest Academy, which opened in September 2014.

The Crest Girls' Academy was sponsored by E-ACT. The school was one of the first to gain a specialism in the specialist schools movement. Crest Girls had three specialisms: Technology (1998) Languages (2004) and Training Schools.

As per Ofsted report in June 2013, the school had serious weakness and offered an inadequate standard of education. The academy underwent a restructuring, merging Crest Girls' Academy and Crest Boys' Academy into one school, retaining single sex education. Both schools merged in September 2014.

GCSE headline figures for the school had risen in recent years. In 2011, 43% of students attending Crest Girls' Academy achieved 5 A*-C grades at GCSE including English and Maths. This rose to 51% 5A*-C grades at GCSE including English and Maths in 2012 and 56% in 2013.
