= List of boys' schools in the United Kingdom =

Here is a list of, in the United Kingdom, the Crown Dependencies, and British Overseas Territories, schools which only admit boys, or those which only admit boys at certain levels/years/grades, or those which follow the Diamond Schools model (separating students by gender at points).

== England ==
=== Bedfordshire ===
- Bedford School, Bedford
- Challney High School for Boys, Luton

=== Berkshire ===
- Desborough College, Maidenhead
- Eton College, Eton
- Ludgrove School, Wokingham
- Papplewick School, Ascot
- Reading School, Reading
- Sunningdale School, Sunningdale
- The Windsor Boys' School, Windsor

=== Bristol ===
- Queen Elizabeth's Hospital, Clifton

=== Buckinghamshire ===
- Aylesbury Grammar School, Aylesbury
- Caldicott School, Farnham Royal
- Dr Challoner's Grammar School, Amersham
- John Hampden Grammar School, High Wycombe

=== Cheshire ===
- Sandbach School, Sandbach

=== Devon ===
- Devonport High School for Boys, Plymouth
- Torquay Boys' Grammar School, Torquay

=== Dorset ===
- Bournemouth School, Charminster
- Poole Grammar School, Poole
- Sherborne School, Sherborne

Bournemouth

- Avonbourne Boys' Academy
- Winton Academy

=== East Yorkshire ===
- Beverley Grammar School, Beverley

=== Essex ===
- New Hall School Boys' Senior School, Boreham
- Southend High School for Boys, Prittlewell

Westcliff-on-Sea

- St Thomas More High School
- Westcliff High School for Boys

=== Gloucestershire ===
- Marling School, Stroud
- Sir Thomas Rich's School, Longlevens

=== Greater London ===
- Beths Grammar School, Bexley
- Brondesbury College
- The Campion School, Hornchurch
- Carshalton Boys Sports College, Carshalton
- Central Foundation Boys' School, Islington
- City of London School, London
- Coombe Boys' School, New Malden
- Darul Hadis Latifiah, Bethnal Green
- Darul Uloom London, Chislehurst
- Eaton House Belgravia Pre-Prep and Prep, Belgravia
- Eaton House The Manor Pre-Prep and Prep, Wandsworth
- Enfield Grammar School, Enfield Town
- Ernest Bevin Academy, Tooting
- Finchley Catholic High School, North Finchley
- Forest Hill School, Forest Hill
- Gunnersbury Boys' School, Brentford
- The Hall School, Belsize Park
- Hampton School, Hampton
- Harris Boys' Academy East Dulwich, Peckham
- Harrow School, Harrow on the Hill
- Ilford County High School, Barkingside
- Isleworth and Syon School, Isleworth
- The John Fisher School, Peaks Hill
- King's House School, Richmond
- Langley Park School for Boys, Beckenham
- London Oratory School
- Marylebone Academy, Marylebone
- Norlington School, Leyton
- Pardes House Grammar School, Finchley
- Queen Elizabeth's School, Barnet
- Ravens Wood School, Keston
- Royal Liberty School, Gidea Park
- Rutlish School, Merton Park
- Salvatorian College, Wealdstone
- St Aloysius' College, Highgate
- St Bonaventure's, Forest Gate
- St Columba's Catholic Boys' School, Bexleyheath
- St Ignatius College, Enfield
- St Joseph's College, Upper Norwood
- St Olave's Grammar School, Orpington
- St Thomas the Apostle College, Nunhead
- Sussex House School, Chelsea
- Tawhid Boys School
- Torah Temimah Primary School, Dollis Hill
- Tower House School, East Sheen
- Trinity School of John Whitgift, Shirley Park (becoming co-ed from Sept 2027)
- University College School, Frognal
- Wallington County Grammar School, Wallington
- Wetherby School, Notting Hill/Kensington/Marylebone
- Whitgift School, South Croydon
- William Ellis School, Gospel Oak
- Woolwich Polytechnic School for Boys, Thamesmead

Barnes

- St Paul's Juniors
- St Paul's School

Brent

- Brondesbury College
- Newman Catholic College

Dulwich

- Dulwich College
- Dulwich Prep & Senior

Hampstead

- Hereward House School
- St Anthony's School

Kingston upon Thames

- Rokeby School
- Tiffin School

Surbiton

- Shrewsbury House School
- Southborough High School

Sutton

- Homefield Preparatory School
- Sutton Grammar School
- Wilson's School

Westminster

- Arnold House School
- Westminster Abbey Choir School
- Westminster Cathedral Choir School
- Westminster City School
- Westminster School (becoming co-ed from Sept 2028)
- Westminster Under School (becoming co-ed from Sept 2026)

Wimbledon

- King's College School (becoming co-ed from Sept 2033)
- Wimbledon College

=== Greater Manchester ===
- Altrincham Grammar School for Boys, Altrincham
- Audenshaw School, Audenshaw
- Bolton School Single Sex Junior, Senior, and Sixth Form schools
- Burnage Academy for Boys, Burnage
- Bury Grammar School, Bury
- Darul Hadis Latifiah Northwest, Oldham
- Darul Uloom Bolton, Bolton
- Manchester Grammar School, Manchester
- Manchester Mesivta School, Prestwich
- St Ambrose College, Hale Barns
- Wellacre Academy, Flixton
- West Hill School, Staybridge

=== Hampshire ===
- Horris Hill School, Newtown
- Lakeside School, Chandler's Ford
- Salesian College, Farnborough

Winchester

- The Pilgrims' School
- Winchester College, Winchester

=== Hertfordshire ===
- Berkhamsted School, Berkhamsted (separate Boys' Senior School)
- The Bishop's Stortford High School, Bishop's Stortford
- Haberdashers' Boys' School, Elstree
- Hitchin Boys' School, Hitchin
- Merchant Taylors' School, Three Rivers
- Richard Hale School, Hertford
- Verulam School, St Albans
- Watford Grammar School for Boys, Watford

=== Kent ===
- Borden Grammar School, Sittingbourne
- Dartford Grammar School, Dartford
- Dover Grammar School for Boys, Dover
- Greenacre Academy, Walderslade
- The Harvey Grammar School, Folkestone
- The Howard School, Rainham
- The Judd School, Tonbridge
- Northfleet Technology College, Northfleet
- Simon Langton Grammar School for Boys, Canterbury
- Sir Joseph Williamson's Mathematical School, Rochester
- Tonbridge School, Tonbridge
- Wilmington Grammar School for Boys, Wilmington

Maidstone

- Maidstone Grammar School
- Oakwood Park Grammar School

Tunbridge Wells

- The Skinners' School
- Tunbridge Wells Grammar School for Boys

=== Lancashire ===
- Hutton Grammar School, Hutton
- Lancaster Royal Grammar School, Lancaster

Blackburn

- Jamiatul Ilm Wal Huda
- Tauheedul Islam Boys' High School

=== Leicestershire ===
- Loughborough Grammar School, Loughborough

=== Lincolnshire ===
- Boston Grammar School, Boston
- The King's School, Grantham
- Spalding Grammar School, Spalding

=== Merseyside ===
- Birkdale High School, Southport
- Calday Grange Grammar School, West Kirby
- St Anselm's College, Birkenhead
- Wirral Grammar School for Boys, Bebington

Liverpool

- Cardinal Heenan Catholic High School
- St Francis Xavier's College
- St Margaret's Church of England Academy

=== Norfolk ===
- Bure Park Specialist Academy, Great Yarmouth

=== North Yorkshire ===
- Ermysted's Grammar School, Skipton

=== Northamptonshire ===
- Northampton School for Boys, Northampton

=== Oxfordshire ===
- Radley College, Radley
- St Birinus School, Didcot
- Summer Fields School, Summertown
- Swalcliffe Park School, Swalcliffe

Oxford

- Christ Church Cathedral School, Oxford
- Magdalen College School (becoming co-ed from Sept 2030)
- New College School

=== Somerset ===
- Beechen Cliff School, Bath

=== Surrey ===
- Glyn School, Ewell
- More House School, Frensham
- Reed's School, Cobham
- Richard Challoner School, Kingston upon Thames
- Royal Grammar School, Guildford (becoming co-ed from Sept 2027)
- St James Independent Schools Senior Boys' School, Ashford (becoming co-ed from Sept 2027)

=== Tyne and Wear ===
- St Aidan's Catholic Academy, Ashbrooke

Newcastle upon Tyne

- Newcastle School for Boys
- St Cuthbert's High School

=== Warwickshire ===
- King Edward VI School, Stratford-upon-Avon
- Lawrence Sheriff School, Rugby
- Warwick School for Boys, Warwick

=== West Midlands ===
Birmingham

- King Edward VI Aston School
- King Edward VI Camp Hill School for Boys
- King Edward VI Handsworth Grammar School for Boys
- King Edward's School
- Lordswood Boys' School
- Turves Green Boys' School
- Wheelers Lane Technology College

=== West Yorkshire ===
- Queen Elizabeth Grammar School, Wakefield
- Upper Batley High School, Batley

=== Wiltshire ===
- Bishop Wordsworth's School, Salisbury

=== Former ===
Became coeducational

- Abbotsholme School, Rocester became coed in 1969.
- Aldwickbury School, Harpenden became coed in 2025.
- Archbishop Tenison's School, Lambeth became coed in 1961 and closed in 2023.
- Bellemoor School, Southampton became the coed Upper Shirley High School in 2008.
- Blewcoat School, Westminster became coed in 1714 and closed in 1926.
- Cambridgeshire High School for Boys, Cambridge became the coed Hills Road Sixth Form College in 1974.
- Charterhouse School, Godalming became coed in 2017.
- Cheltenham College, Cheltenham became coed in 1969.
- The Crypt School, Podsmead became coed in 2018.
- Culverhay School, Bath became the coed Bath Community Academy in 2012, which closed in 2018.
- Cray Valley Technical School, St. Paul's Cray, became the coed Kemnal Technology College in 1974.
- Christ's College, Finchley became coed in 2018.
- Derby Grammar School, Littleover became coed in 2007.
- Derby School, Derby became coed in 1972 and closed in 1989.
- Durston House, Ealing became coed in 2023.
- Elmhurst School, South Croydon became coed in 2024.
- Eltham College, Mottingham became coed in 2024.
- The Forest School, Horsham, Horsham became coed in 2021.
- The Forest School, Winnersh, Winnersh became coed in 2024.
- Foxwood School, Leeds became coed in 1971.
- Gordon's School, West End became coed in 1990.
- Hayesbrook School, Tonbridge became the coed Leigh Academy Tonbridge in 2023.
- Hull Trinity House Academy, Kingston upon Hull became coed in 2022.
- John Lyon School, Harrow on the Hill became coed in 2021.
- The Mall School, Twickenham became coed in 2023.
- Marlborough Royal Free Grammar School, Marlborough became coed in 1906 and closed in 1975.
- Norwich High School for Boys, Norwich became the coed Langley School in the 1940s.
- Oakham School, Oakham became coed in 1971.
- Old Swinford Hospital, Stourbridge became coed in 2021.
- Pierrepont School, Frensham became coed in 1983 and closed in 1993.
- Plymouth Grammar School, Plymouth became coed in the 1900s and closed in 1937.
- Reading Blue Coat School, Sonning was originally a boys' school.
- Repton School, Repton became coed in the 1970s.
- Rugby School, Rugby became coed in 1992.
- Ryhope Grammar School, Ryhope became coed in 1969 and closed in 1988.
- Saint George Catholic College, Swaythling became a boys' school in the 1970s and returned to coed in 2013.
- Sedbergh School, Sedbergh became coed in 2001.
- Shiplake College, Shiplake became coed in 2023.
- Shrewsbury School, Shrewsbury became coed in 2015.
- Solihull School, Solihull became coed in 2005.
- Stamford School, Stamford became coed in 2023.
- St Columba's College, St Albans became coed in 2020.
- St George's School became a girls' school in 1904.
- St John's School, Leatherhead became coed in 2012.
- St Peter's School, York became coed in 1987.
- Temple Grove School, Heron's Ghyll became coed in 1984 and closed in 2005.
- Wellington College, Crowthorne became coed in 2005.
- Wixenford School, Wokingham (1869–1934).
- Worth School, Turners Hill became coed in 2008.

Merged

- The Cedars School, Upper Norwood merged with The Laurels School to become Fidelis College in 2025.
- Central Technology College, Gloucester merged with Bishop's College to become Gloucester Academy in 2006.
- Chatham House Grammar School, Ramsgate merged with Clarendon House Grammar School to become the Chatham & Clarendon Grammar School in 2011.
- Chichester High School for Boys, Chichester merged with Chichester High School for Girls to become Chichester High School in 2016.
- Crest Boys' Academy, Neasden merged with Crest Girls' Academy to become E-ACT Crest Academy in 2014.
- Friern Barnet Grammar School, Friern Barnet merged into the Dwight School London in 1995.
- Hawtreys Preparatory School, Slough merged into Cheam School in 1994.
- Kitwood Boys School, Boston merged with the Kitwood Girls' School to become Haven High Academy in 1992.
- Littlemoss High School, Littlemoss merged with Droylsden School, Mathematics and Computing College for Girls to become the Droylsden Academy in 2009.
- Manchester Central Grammar School/High School for Boys, Manchester merged into the coed Manchester Academy in 1967.
- Richmond Boys School, Halesowen merged with the Walton Girls School to become Windsor High School, Halesowen in 1985.
- Salesian College, Battersea merged with John Paul II School to become St John Bosco College, Battersea.
- Scaitcliffe, Egham merged with Virginia Water Prep School to become Bishopsgate School in 1996.
- Stubbington House School, Stubbington merged with the Earleywood School in 1962 and closed in 1997.
- Sudbury Grammar School, Sudbury merged with the High School for Girls to become Ormiston Sudbury Academy in 1972.
- Tottenham Grammar School, Tottenham merged with the Rowland Hill Secondary Modern School to become the Somerset School in 1967, which closed in 1988.
- Wandsworth School, Southfields merged with Spencer Park School to become John Archer School, which closed in 1991.
- Warwick School for Boys, Waltham Forest merged with Aveling Park School to become Frederick Bremer School in 2008.

Closed

- Abbotsfield School for Boys, Hillingdon (1953–2017)
- Al Karam Secondary School, Eaton (1995–2014)
- Amersham Hall, Amersham (1829–1896)
- Ascham St Vincent's School, Eastbourne (1889–1938)
- Blackheath Proprietary School, Blackheath
- Bruce Castle School, Tottenham (1827–1891)
- Buckhurst Hill County High School, Chigwell (1938–1989)
- City of Bath Technical School, Bath (1927–1973)
- City of Oxford High School for Boys (1881–1966)
- Clapham College, Clapham Common (1897–1989)
- Clifton House School, Harrogate (1898–1968)
- Divine Mercy College, Henley-on-Thames (1953–1986)
- Greenways School, Codford (closed 1969)
- Grove House School, Tottenham (1828–1877)
- Heatherdown School, Ascot (closed 1982)
- Huyton Hill Preparatory School, Huyton (1926–1969)
- Jameah Islameah School, Mark Cross (closed 2007)
- Kensington School, Kensington (1830–1896)
- Kesgrave Hall School, Ipswich (1976–1993)
- Kettering Grammar School, Kettering (closed 1976)
- Kingwell Court Preparatory School, Bradford-on-Avon (1936–1990)
- Liverpool Institute High School for Boys, Liverpool (1825–1985)
- Mayfield College, Mayfield (1868–1999)
- Mount Radford School, Exeter (1827–1967)
- Priory Preparatory School, Banstead (1921–2017)
- Purley High School for Boys, Coulsdon (1914–1988)
- Retford King Edward VI Grammar School, Retford (1857–2003)
- Royal Masonic School for Boys, Bushey (1903–1977)
- Shardlow Hall, Shardlow (1911–1933)
- St Cyprian's School, Eastbourne (1899–1943)
- St Philip's School, Birmingham (1887–1976)
- Strand School, Tulse Hill (1893–1979)
- Summerfields Preparatory School, St Leonards-on-Sea (closed 1966)
- Sutton High School for Boys, Plymouth (1926–1986)
- Tulse Hill School, Upper Tulse Hill (1956–1990)
- Uckfield School, Uckfield (1718–1930)
- Watts Naval School, North Elmham (1903–1953)
- Woolverstone Hall School, Ipswich (1951–1990)
- Wyggeston Grammar School for Boys, Leicester (1876–1976)
- Wykeham House School, Fareham opened a boys' school in 2013 and closed in 2015.

== Northern Ireland ==
- Bangor Grammar School, Bangor
- Christian Brothers Grammar School, Omagh
- St Michael's College, Enniskillen
- St Patrick's Grammar School, Armagh

Belfast

- Ashfield Boys' High School
- Belfast Boys' Model School
- De La Salle College
- Royal Belfast Academical Institution
- St Malachy's College
- St Mary's Christian Brothers' Grammar School

Derry

- St. Columb's College
- St Joseph's Boys' School

Newry

- Abbey Christian Brothers' Grammar School
- St Colman's College
- St Joseph's Boys' High School

Former

- Annadale Grammar School, Belfast merged with Carolan Grammar School to become Wellington College Belfast in 1990.
- Coleraine Academical Institution, Coleraine merged with Coleraine High School to become the coed Coleraine Grammar School in 2015.
- Gort na Móna Secondary School, Belfast (1971–1988)
- St Patrick's College merged with Little Flower Catholic School to become Blessed Trinity College in 2017.

== Scotland ==
- Merchiston Castle School, Colinton
- Stewart's Melville College, Edinburgh

Former

- Allan Glen's School, Glasgow became coed in 1973 and closed in 1989.
- Craigflower Preparatory School, Torryburn (1923–1979
- Dalhousie School, Cupar (1925–1970)
- Hutchesons' Grammar School, Glasgow became coed in 1976
- Scotus Academy, Edinburgh (1953–1978)
- St Mirin's Academy, Paisley (1922–1976)
- St Ninian's School, Moffat (1879–1979)
- St Peter's Boys School, Partick (closed 2013)
- Warriston School, Moffat (1899–1984)
- Wellington School, Midlothian (1859–2014)

== Wales ==
- Lewis Boys School, Gilfach

Former

- Aberdare Boys' Comprehensive School, Aberdare merged with the Aberdare Girls' School and Blaengwawr Comprehensive School to become Aberdare Community School in 2012.
- Arnold House, Llanddulas (1867–1943)
- Barry Comprehensive School, Barry (1966–2018)
- Monmouth School, Monmouth merged with the Haberdashers' Monmouth School for Girls to become Haberdashers' Monmouth School in 2024.

== British Crown Dependencies ==
Guernsey

Former

- Elizabeth College, Saint Peter Port became coed in 2021.

Jersey

- De La Salle College, St Saviour
- Victoria College, St Helier

== British Overseas Territories ==
Gibraltar

- Formerly for boys only: Bayside Comprehensive School (now coeducational)

== See also ==
- List of girls' schools in the United Kingdom
- List of boys' schools in Hong Kong (Hong Kong was formerly a UK territory)
