= Rezia Wahid =

Bangladeshi-born British textile artist and designer (born 1975)

- Born: 1975 (age 50–51); Bangladesh
- Education: Chelsea College of Art and Design; Surrey Institute of Art and Design
- Known for: Textile arts, Weaving
- Awards: Alhambra Award for Arts 2004, MBE for services to arts 2005
- Website: www.reziawahid.com

Rezia Wahid, MBE (Bengali: রেজিয়া ওয়াহিদ; born 1975) is a Bangladeshi-born British textile artist and designer. Her work has been exhibited both in the United Kingdom and abroad.

== Early life ==
Rezia Wahid was born in Bangladesh and lived in both the United Kingdom and Bangladesh until the age of five when she stayed in the UK.

She attended the Chelsea College of Art and Design 1994–1995 and was awarded a first class degree from Surrey Institute of Art & Design, University College|Surrey Institute of Art and Design] in 1998.

== Career ==
Rezia Wahid has stated that her work seeks to evoke 'air, peace, and tranquility', and that we are 'surrounded by the beauty of nature, God's attributes which we need to celebrate.' Her signature works are gossamer-light woven cloths that are both art objects and utilitarian craft, displayed as such in galleries and museums, worn as scarf or shawl, or hung as room furnishings. Her pieces can be seen as an extension of minimalist art (a cited influence is painter Agnes Martin), an intercultural approach to hand weaving, and a subtle dialogue with the heritage of Islamic art and architecture. She achieves her transparency and translucence through a formidable technique working on a countermarch loom to produce cloths so fine that the fabric in parts is virtually invisible to the naked eye.

Her work takes in influences from her English upbringing (she acknowledges as an inspiration William Morris and the Arts & Crafts Movement), her Islamic spirituality, and techniques taken from Indonesian 'ikat', Japanese 'kasuri', and Bangladeshi textiles. A key discovery was of a fabric native to Bangladesh known as Baf-thana (literally 'woven air'), and the Jamdani technique that goes into weaving them.

Wahid was one of the three artists to be selected by the South West Arts Council to create a piece celebrating the cultural diversity of Britain.

She has also taught at Warwick School for Boys as the Art, Design and Textiles teacher and currently at Frederick Bremer School.

== Awards and recognition ==
In 2004 she received the Alhambra Award for Arts given at the Muslim News Awards.

In 2005, Wahid was appointed a Member of the Order of the British Empire (MBE) in the 2005 New Year Honours for her contribution to arts in London.

== See also ==
- British Bangladeshi
- List of British Bangladeshis
