= Frederick Bremer =

British engineer and inventor

Frederick William Bremer
- Born: 12 July 1872; Stepney, Middlesex, England
- Died: 1941; Walthamstow, Essex, England
- Engineering career
- Practice name: Frederick Bremer Motor Manufacturer; Bremer Engineering Company, Motor Manufacturers
- Projects: The Bremer Car, the first British four-wheeled motor car with an internal combustion engine
- Significant advance: Zelish, Nyron, Andre

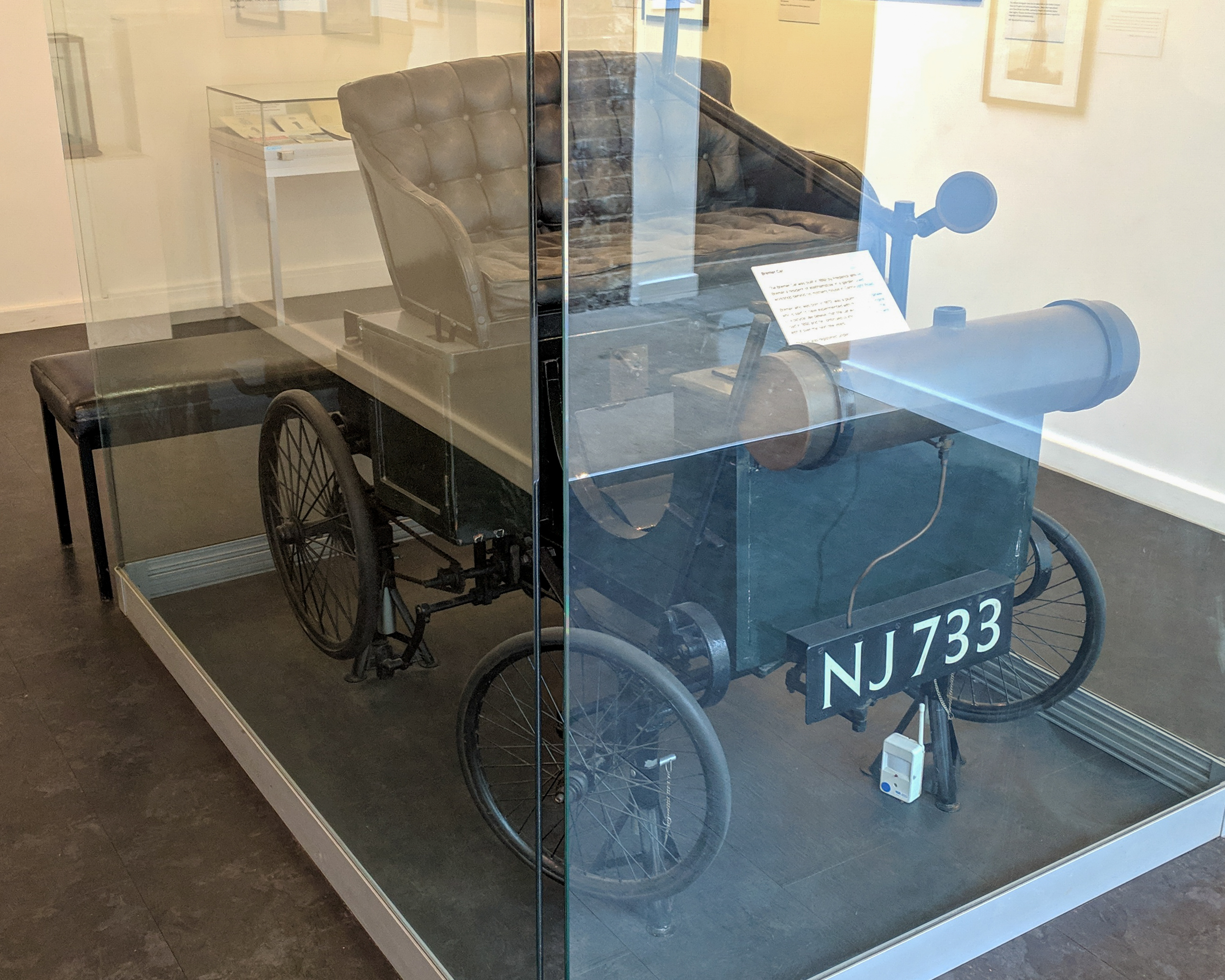
The Bremer car on display at Vestry House Museum, Walthamstow.

Frederick William Bremer (12 July 1872 in Stepney, London – 1941 in Walthamstow, England) was a British gasfitter, plumber, engineer and inventor recognised as the man who built the first petrol-fuelled car in Great Britain in 1892.

== Bremer car ==
A gas-fitter and plumber by trade, Frederick is remembered for building (with assistant Tom Bates) the first British four-wheeled motor car with an internal combustion engine in 1892 (claimed in 1912 by the British magazine Motor). In 1894 he took his car on the roads of Walthamstow, his home town.

After completing the car Bremer moved on to other projects including a four-cylinder car in 1894 which has not survived to the present day. Bremer also operated a series of small businesses, including the Bremer Engineering Company, and took out patents, which included one for improved gears for motor carriages.

Frederick married Annie Elizabeth Garner on 22 April 1916, despite the marriage certificate listing him as Frederick Brewer, and his father as Gerberd Brewer.

In 1933 Bremer donated his car to the Vestry House Museum in Walthamstow, where it can still be seen. In 1964 the Bremer Car was entered into the London to Brighton Veteran Car Run enlisted as car number 1, but the crankshaft broke after 17 miles (27 km). The next year, again as car number 1, it completed the 54-mile (87 km) course in just under eight hours.

Bremer died in 1941 and is buried at St Mary's Church in Walthamstow along with his wife Annie.

== Legacy ==
Frederick Bremer School, a specialist engineering college named after Bremer, opened in September 2008. The school replaced Warwick School for Boys and Aveling Park School.

== See also ==
- John Henry Knight
