= Anne Carnegie, Countess of Northesk =

Scottish noblewoman (1730–1779)

Anne Carnegie, Countess of Northesk (born Anne Leslie; 27 February 1730 – 6 November 1779) was a Scottish noblewoman. She was the wife of George Carnegie, 6th Earl of Northesk, and the mother of William Carnegie, 7th Earl of Northesk.

Anne Leslie was born in Raith, Fife, the daughter of Alexander Leslie, 5th Earl of Leven, and his second wife, the former Elizabeth Monypenny. Her sister was the novelist Lady Mary Hamilton. The family's main residence was Melville House in Fife.

Anne married the Earl of Northesk on 30 April 1748, and they had six children, all of whom survived their mother.

- Lady Mary Anne Carnegie (died 2 June 1798), who married Rev John Kemp of Edinburgh in 1797
- David Carnegie, Lord Rosehill (5 April 1749 – 19 February 1788)
- Lady Elizabeth Carnegie (1751 – 19 August 1793), who married James Hope-Johnstone, 3rd Earl of Hopetoun.
- Admiral William Carnegie, 7th Earl of Northesk (10 April 1756 – 28 May 1831)
- Lieutenant Colonel George Carnegie (21 August 1773 – 1839)
- Margaret Carnegie (1779 – 15 March 1793)

Lady Northesk was apparently suffering from tuberculosis and had been pronounced incurable by several doctors. On her way home to Scotland, she called at Lichfield, where she was treated by Erasmus Darwin. Darwin considered treating her anaemia with a blood transfusion by syringe, using her friend, his neighbour Anna Seward, as a possible donor. He decided against the idea, and instead prescribed a diet of milk, vegetables and fruit, in addition to rest and fresh air, which appears to have been effective.

Lady Northesk continued to correspond with Seward, and later died in Edinburgh, in a domestic accident, after accidentally setting fire to her muslin cap.
