= Anne Leslie =

Anne Leslie may refer to:

- Ann Leslie (1941–2023), British journalist
- Anne Leslie, Duchess of Rothes (1631–1689), Scottish aristocrat
- Anne Carnegie, Countess of Northesk (1730–1779), née Leslie, Scottish noblewoman
