= Mickey Niblock =

Derry Gaelic footballer

Personal information
- Born: Magherafelt, County Londonderry, Northern Ireland

Sport
- Sport: Gaelic football
- Position: Half forward
Clubs
- Years: Club
- 19xx–19xx 19xx–19xx 1978–19xx 19xx–1992: Magherafelt; Various American clubs Douglas; Nemo Rangers
Club titles
- Derry titles: 1
Inter-county
- Years: County
- 1966–1973: Derry
Inter-county titles
- Ulster titles: 1

Mickey Niblock is a former Gaelic footballer who played for the Derry county team between 1966 and 1973. He won an Ulster Senior Football Championship with the county, as well as Ulster Minor, Ulster Under 21, All-Ireland Minor and All-Ireland Under 21 Football Championships.

Niblock started his club career with O'Donovan Rossa Magherafelt (and returned to win a Derry Senior Football Championship with the club). He later played for various club sides in the United States. Upon returning to Ireland he played for Douglas and Nemo Rangers in County Cork. He had much success with Nemo, including winning ? Cork Championships, ? Munster Club Championships and two All-Ireland Senior Club Football Championships.

He usually played in the half forward line, but could also play in midfield. Niblock is known as one of Derry's best ever players. He "glided through the heart of defences with consummate ease" and was known for his "silky skills".

== Personal life ==
Niblock is originally from Magherafelt, Northern Ireland. His uncle Frank was part of the Derry side that won the county's first ever National Football League title in 1947. Frank was a big influence on Mickey during his early years. Mickey's brothers Laurence, Dermot, Hugh, Brendan and twins Robert and Raymond all played for Magherafelt alongside him, with Hugh also playing for Derry.

Niblock emigrated from Ireland to the United States in 1971. He met his wife Dolores (from Youghal, County Cork) while in New York City. While there, Niblock played soccer for the New York Cosmos in the North American Soccer League (NASL) 1973 season. He and Dolores returned from America in 1978 and settled down in Cork. He has two sons, Trevor and David. Niblock's son David has played for Cork in the past.

== Playing career ==
=== Club ===
Niblock played his underage football with home-club O'Donovan Rossa Magherafelt and soon progressed to the club's Senior team.

For the seven years he was in the United States between 1971 and 1978, Niblock played for a variety of clubs. In New York he played for the Monaghan club, before later transferring to Sligo. He won Championships with both teams. When his team wasn't in action on certain weekends, he'd go to play for clubs in the likes of Chicago, Philadelphia or Boston, for example he often played for Tyrone in Philadelphia.

When he moved back to Ireland in 1978 Niblock played with Intermediate Cork side Douglas for a while. While there he travelled home and helped Magherafelt win the 1978 Derry Senior Football Championship. It was the Magherafelt's first county title in 29 years. It is a breach of the rules to play for two clubs in different counties at the same time, but as Niblock says "I couldn't resist it. Three of my brothers were playing in that final and it gave me a great thrill to win the Championship alongside them". That minor indiscretion deprived him of the opportunity to play for Cork, but he has no regrets.

He was later advised that Nemo Rangers were a more football orientated club than Douglas and he soon transferred to them. His honours with the club include ? Cork Championships, ? Munster Club Championships and two All-Ireland Senior Club Football Championships (1982 and 1984). He retired from club football in 1992.

=== Inter-county ===
Niblock first came to prominence as part of the Derry Minor side that won both the Ulster Minor and All-Ireland Minor Championships in 1965, beating Cavan and Kerry in the respective finals. He played at centre half forward on the team. The success was Derry's first ever All-Ireland Minor title.

Three years later he helped the Derry Under-21 team win both the Ulster Under 21 and All-Ireland Under 21 Championships. Having reached the Ulster Under 21 final, they beat Monaghan. In the All-Ireland semi-final Derry defeated a fancied Kerry team with ease. In the All-Ireland final Derry met Offaly in Croke Park and won 3–09 to 1–09, with Niblock scoring 1-01 from centre half forward. The success was Derry's first ever All-Ireland Under 21 title.

Niblock made his Derry Senior debut in 1966, while still a Minor. In 1970 Niblock helped Derry win the Ulster Senior Football Championship, overcoming Antrim in the final. Derry met Kerry in the All-Ireland semi-final, but were defeated. The following year Derry lost to Down in the Ulster final. Niblock scored 2-04 from play, a record which was overtaken by Tyrone's Frank McGuigan in 1984.

Later that year he emigrated to America, interrupting his inter-county career. He flew home from New York to play for Derry in the 1972-1973 National Football League semi-final against Kerry in Croke Park. It was Niblock's last game for the county.

Niblock was later selected to play for Cork, but couldn't due to the indiscretion about playing for two clubs at once (see above).

=== Province ===
Niblock represented Ulster and won a Railway Cup with the province in 1970.

== Coaching and managerial career ==
Currently Managing Cork Club Douglas.

== Soccer ==
Niblock was also a talented soccer player, and teams he had trials for include Cork Hibernians. After emigrating to New York in 1971, he was signed by the New York Cosmos in June 1973 and played in the North American Soccer League (NASL) 1973 season. Wearing the number 7 shirt, he contributed one assist for the Cosmos in seven appearances.
