= Kara (Sikhism) =

Ceremonial religious bracelet worn by Sikhs

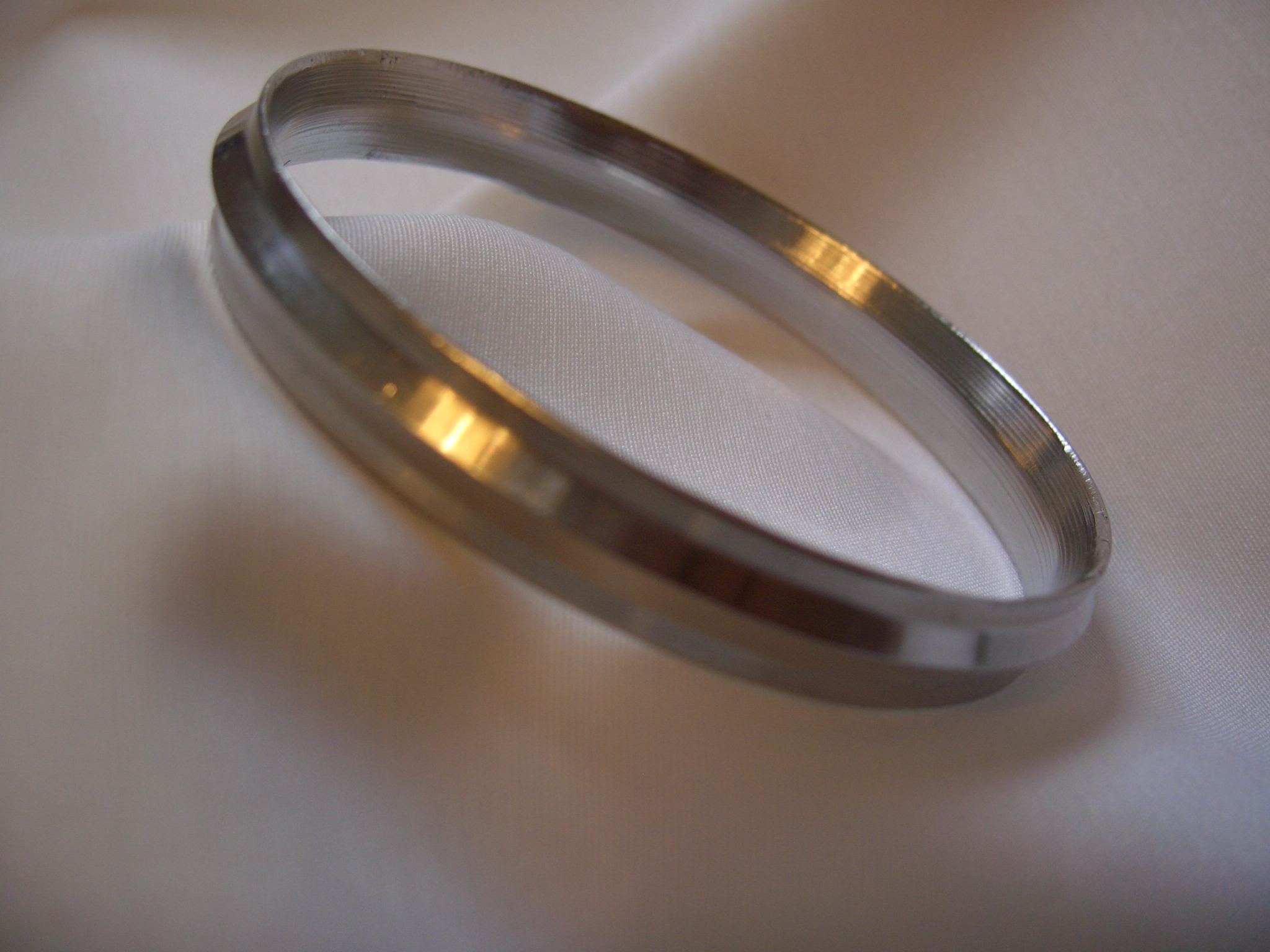
Kara – one of the five articles of faith for Sikhs

A kara, or kada (Punjabi: ਕੜਾ (Gurmukhi), کڑا (Shahmukhi) कड़ा (Devanagari)), is a steel or cast iron bangle worn by Sikhs and sometimes Indian people of other religions. Sikhism preaches the importance of equality and having reverence for God at all times, which is represented through the five Ks—ceremonial items worn or used by Sikhs who have been initiated into the Khalsa, of which kara is one.

== History ==
According to the Sikh scholar Pashaura Singh, the sixth Sikh guru, Guru Hargobind, had his warriors wear the kara. The kara was also instituted by the tenth Sikh guru, Gobind Singh, at the Baisakhi Amrit Sanchar, in 1699. It is a symbol of unbreakable attachment and commitment to God.

== Meaning and usage ==
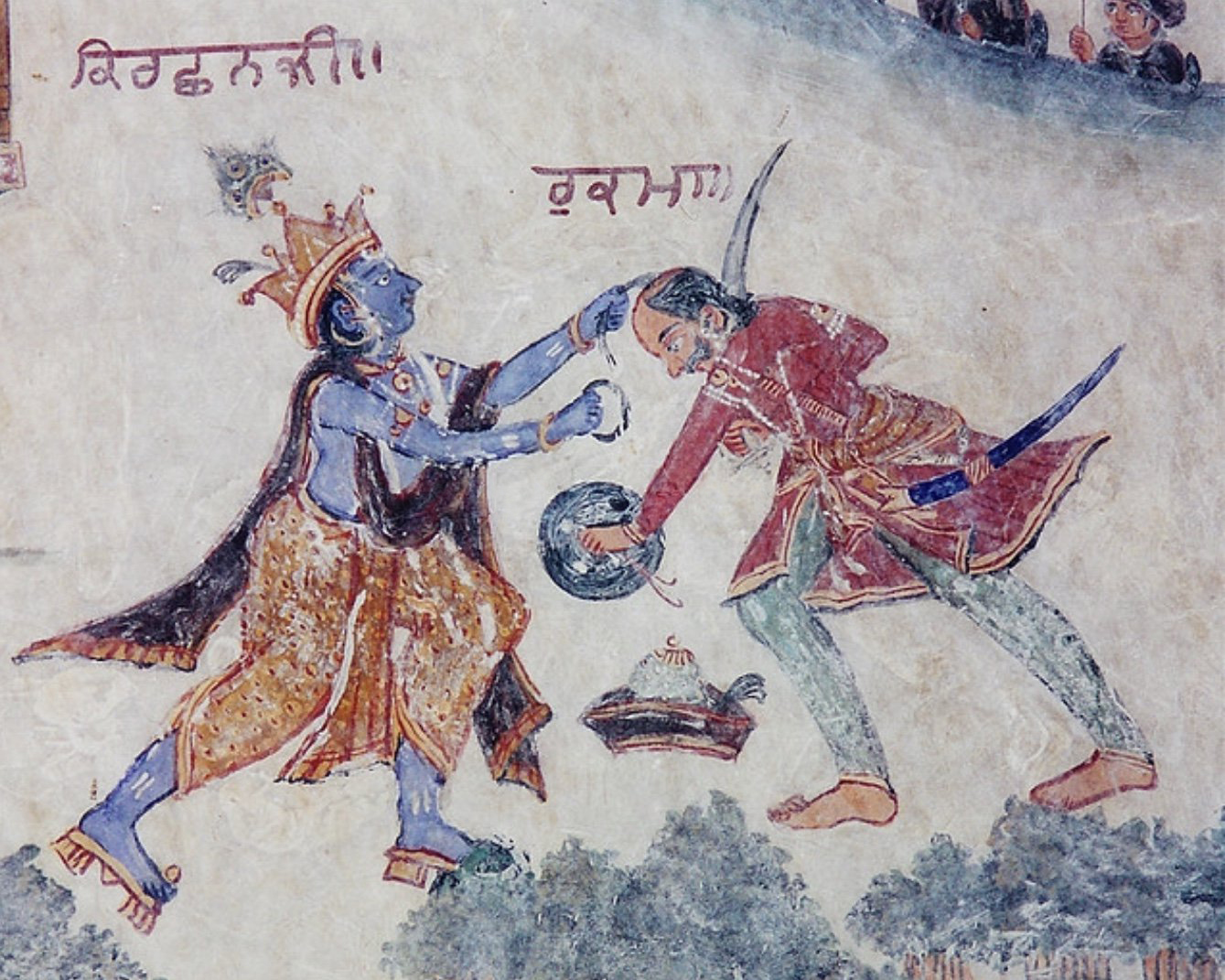
Punjabi fresco from Ferozepur district, Punjab, depicting the duel between Krishna and Rukmi, with Krishna using a kara as a weapon.

=== Sikhs ===
The kara is a symbol of unbreakable attachment and commitment to God.

=== Non-Sikhs ===
The kara is also worn by many non-Sikh Punjabis and non-Punjabi Hindu families across states in the north, northwest, and west of India (such as Gujarat, Rajasthan, and Maharashtra).

== Controversies ==
=== India ===
In 2022, a female Sikh candidate, Manharleen Kaur, was barred from taking a competitive examination by the Delhi Subordinate Services Selection Board (DSSSB) until she removed her kara. Kaur later filed a case against the DSSSB at the Delhi High Court. The DSSSB later stated that Sikh candidates would be permitted to appear in examinations with a kara or kirpan, subject to their reaching the centre at least one hour before the reporting time.

=== United Kingdom ===
In November 2007, a 14-year-old Sikh girl, Sarika Singh, was excluded from Aberdare Girls' School in Wales for wearing a kara, as the "school has banned students from wearing any jewellery other than plain ear studs and wrist watches". In July 2008, Judge Stephen Silber of the High Court of England and Wales stated that "the bangle — known as the kara — was a symbol of her Sikh faith and not a piece of jewellery". He further said that "the school is guilty of indirect discrimination under race relations and equality laws", and Singh was allowed to return to school wearing her kara in September 2008.

In 2017, eight-year-old Kaiden Singh was banned from wearing a kara to school in Tipton, England.
