= Hugh Niblock =

Derry Gaelic footballer (1949–2022)

Personal information
- Native name: Aodh Niobloch (Irish)
- Born: September 1949 Magherafelt, County Londonderry, Northern Ireland
- Died: 18 February 2022 (aged 72) Belfast, County Down, Northern Ireland
- Occupation: Secondary school teacher

Sport
- Sport: Gaelic football
- Position: Left corner-forward
Clubs
- Years: Club
- Magherafelt; St Gall's
Club titles
- Derry titles: 1
Inter-county
- Years: County
- Derry
Inter-county titles
- Ulster titles: 2
- All-Irelands: 0
- NFL: 0
- All Stars: 0

Hugh Niblock (September 1949 – 18 February 2022) was a Gaelic footballer who played for the Magherafelt and St Gall's clubs and at senior level for the Derry county team. He usually lined out as a forward.

== Career ==
Niblock first played Gaelic football at juvenile and underage levels with the Magherafelt club. He progressed onto the club's senior team and won a Derry SFC title in 1975, in what was the club's first ever championship success at inter-county level. Niblock first appeared for the Derry minor football team in 1967 before later joining the under-21 side. As a member of the Derry senior football team, he won Ulster Championship titles in 1970 and 1975. Niblock subsequently became involved with the St. Gall's club in Belfast.

== Personal life and death ==
Niblock was born in Magherafelt in September 1949. His family had a strong association with sport, with his uncle, Frank Niblock, lining out for Derry when they won the National League in 1947. Niblock's brother, Mickey, was a contemporary on the Derry team, while his nephew, David Niblock, won a Munster Championship title with Cork. Niblock qualified as a teacher and spent the majority of his working life in St Patrick's College in Belfast.

Niblock died on 18 February 2022, at the age of 72.

== Honours ==
Magherafelt

- Derry Senior Football Championship: 1978

Derry

- Ulster Senior Football Championship: 1970, 1975
