= Francis Brown Douglas =

Scottish advocate (1814–1885)

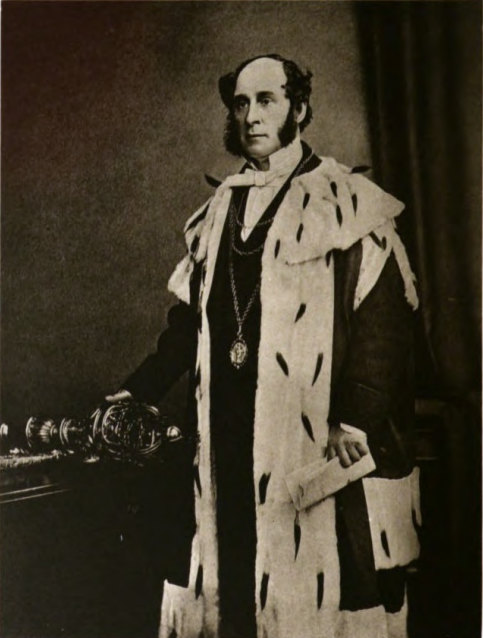
Francis Brown Douglas, Lord Provost of Edinburgh

Francis Brown Douglas FRSE DL (2 April 1814 – 8 August 1885) was a Scottish advocate who served as the Lord Provost of Edinburgh from 1859 to 1862.

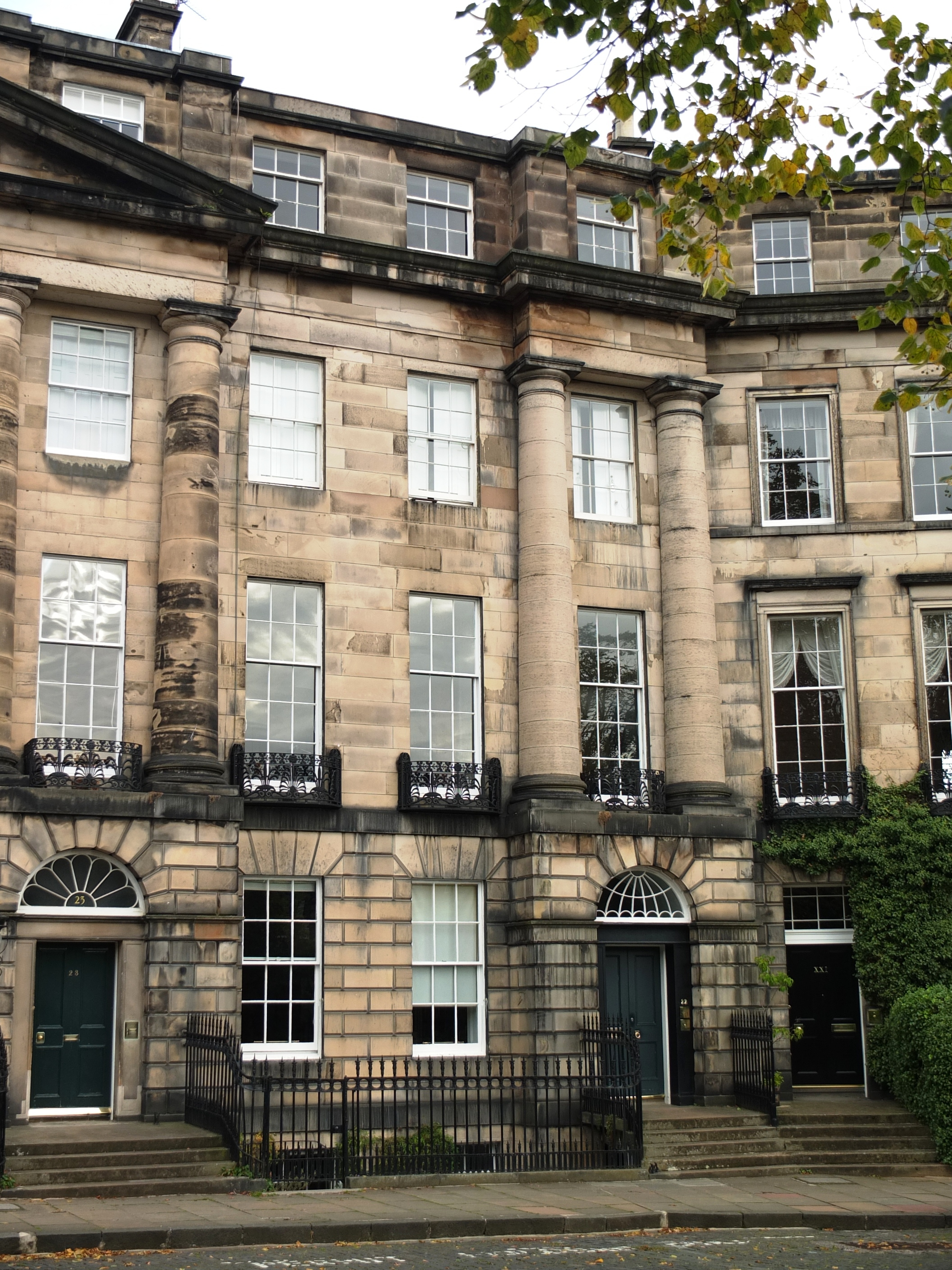
Douglas's family home at 21 Moray Place in Edinburgh

== Life ==
He was born in Largs in Ayrshire on 2 April 1814, the son of Archibald Douglas, also an advocate, and Jane Brown of Bellair on the island of St. Vincent. He attended the High School of Edinburgh and then Edinburgh Academy (1824–1825). He then studied law at the University of Edinburgh.

Following the Slavery Abolition Act 1833, Francis received a considerable sum in compensation for his father's loss (his father being deceased) of 245 slaves on the Sans Souci Estate on St Vincent. This sum, probably received around 1845, totalled £6,418.

In 1839 he was elected a fellow of the Royal Society of Edinburgh his proposer was John Shank More. In 1843 he left the established Church of Scotland to join the Free Church of Scotland. He was an elder at Pilrig Free Church under the Rev William Garden Blaikie.

On 7 August 1860 he oversaw, as Lord Provost of Edinburgh, the Great Review for Queen Victoria and the Royal Family, which involved over 20,000 persons.

His home for most of his life was 21 Moray Place in the fashionable West End.

He died at Melville House in Fife on 8 August 1885. He is buried in Dean Cemetery in the west of Edinburgh. The grave lies on the western wall at the southern end of Lord's Row.

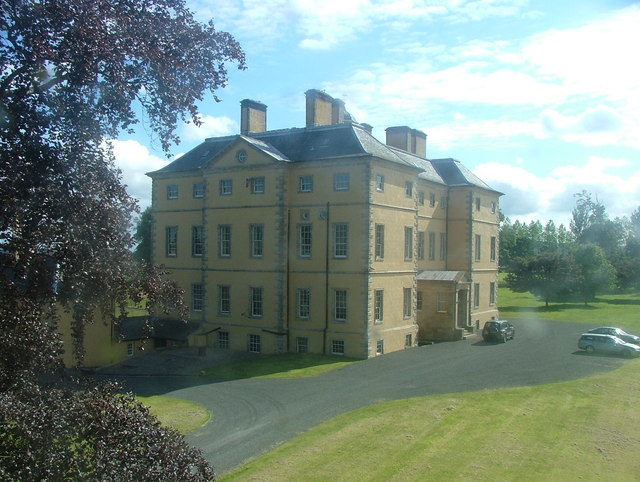
Melville House, where Douglas died

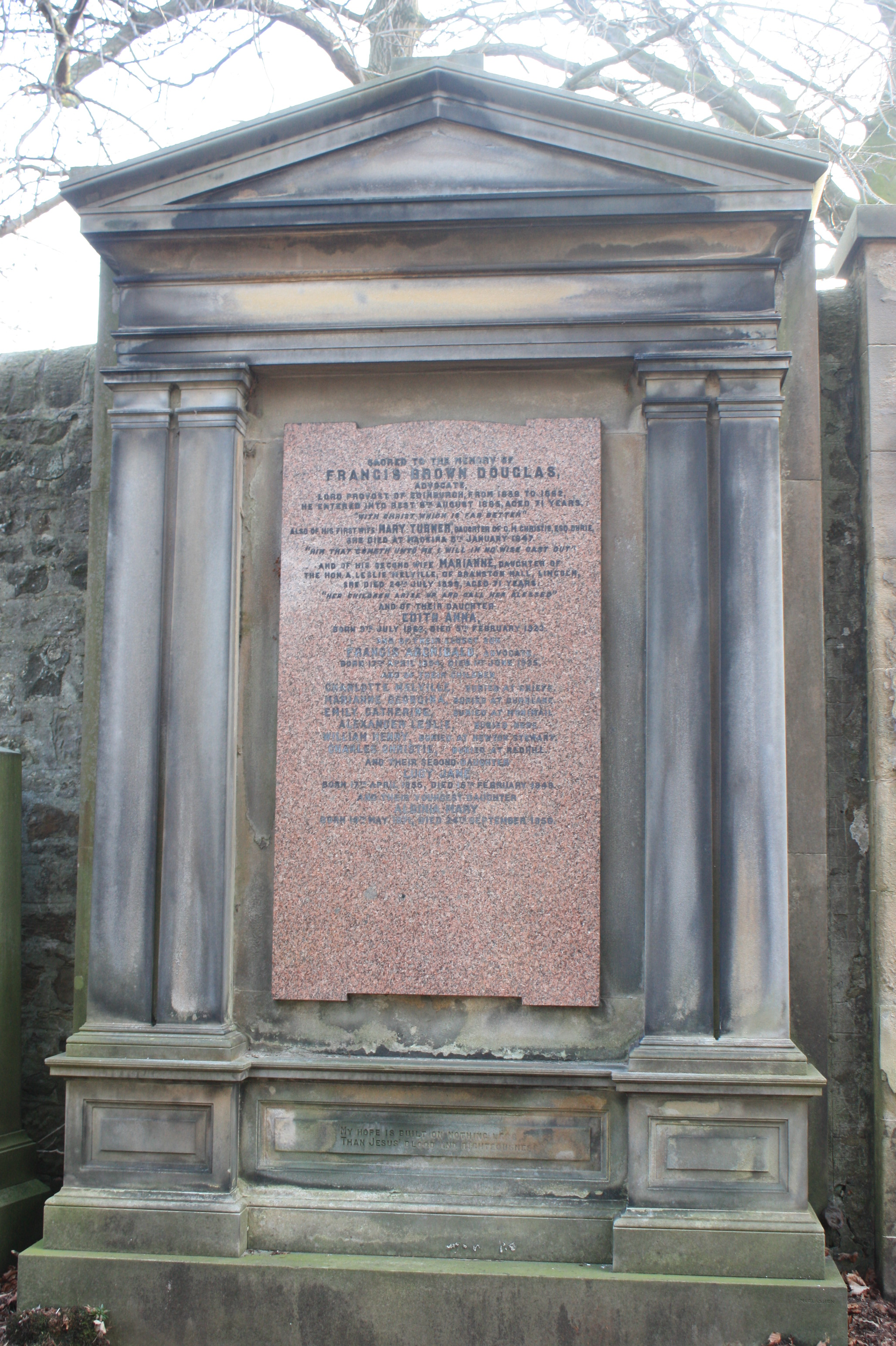
The grave of Francis Brown Douglas, Dean Cemetery

== Family ==
He was brother to Dr Archibald Douglas and cousin to Dr A. Halliday Douglas.

He was married twice: firstly in 1845 to Mary Turner Christie at Scoonie in Fife; secondly in 1852 to the wealthy Marianne Leslie-Melville, with whom he had nine children.

His eldest son, Francis Archibald Brown Douglas (b.1854) was also an advocate after studying law at the University of Cambridge,

His second son was Charles Christie Brown Douglas (b.1857).
