= Dalhousie School =

Location
- Monimail; Cupar, Fife, KY15 7RJ; Scotland

Information
- Type: Preparatory school
- Motto: Efficiunt Clarum Studia
- Established: 1925
- Founder: Kenneth M Mylne
- Closed: 1970
- Gender: Boys
- Age: 5 to 13

Dalhousie Preparatory School was a private preparatory school in Scotland.

Dalhousie was established in 1925 by Kenneth M Mylne at Dalhousie Castle, Bonnyrigg, 8 miles south of Edinburgh. Mylne had previously been headmaster of the preparatory branch of Merchiston Castle School for five years. In 1950 the school moved to new premises at Melville House near Cupar in Fife. The school closed in 1970.

== Notable alumni ==
- Chris Baur
- Robert Angus Brooks
- Abid Bhat
