= Blessed Trinity College =

Coordinates: 54.6313°N 5.9371°W

Blessed Trinity College, Belfast
- Belfast, BT15 4DZ; Ireland

Information
- Type: Secondary School
- Religious affiliation: Roman Catholic
- Local authority: Education Authority (Belfast)
- Principal: Bernadette Lyttle
- Staff: 140 approx.
- Gender: Co-educational
- Age: 11 to 19
- Enrolment: 1300
- Colour
- Website: www.blessedtrinitycollege.org

Blessed Trinity College is a Roman Catholic co-education secondary school located on the Antrim Road in north Belfast, Northern Ireland.

== History ==
The college was formed in 2017 with the coming together of the Little Flower School and St Patrick's College, Belfast. Both of these schools had a long history of providing secondary education in north Belfast with St. Patrick's having been established in 1955.

== Academics ==
The school provides instruction in a range of academic subjects. At GCSE A-level it offers instruction in art and design, business studies, drama, engineering, English literature, French, geography, history, health and social care, ICT, Irish, mathematics, moving image arts, music, religious studies, science, sports studies, and travel and tourism. In 2021, 91 per cent of pupils achieved five or more GCSE grades.

== Sports and Extra-curricular activities ==
There is a wide range of sporting and other activities. Sports include athletics, swimming, tennis, football and netball.

== Awards ==
In 2021, the college was awarded the Spirit of Catholic Education Award 2021, with High Commendation by the Down and Connor Diocese Catholic Schools’ Support Service.

In 2025, the college made it to the finals of the ABP Angus Youth Challenge and then was presented with five Aberdeen Angus calves. The school was being represented by the four Year 11-12 students Callum O’Neill, Hayleigh Hayles, Brooke Devlin and Deaglan McFarlane.

== Notable alumni ==
- Ryan Burnett - boxer (attended St. Patrick's)
- Josh Briggs - U21, West Ham United and Northern Ireland, defender.
- Callum O’Neill - 2025/26 ABP Youth Angus Challenge Runner-Up
- Hayleigh Hayles - 2025/26 ABP Youth Angus Challenge Runner-Up
- Brooke Devlin - 2025/26 ABP Youth Angus Challenge Runner-Up
- Deaglan McFarlane - 2025/26 ABP Youth Angus Challenge Runner-Up
- Martin Dillon - author, journalist, and broadcaster. (attended St. Patrick's)
- Sam Millar - crime writer and playwright (attended St. Patrick's)

== See also ==
- List of secondary schools in Belfast
- List of secondary schools in Northern Ireland
