= List of boys' schools in Hong Kong =

Here are lists of schools which only admit boys in Hong Kong.

== Hong Kong Island ==
Central and Western District

Secondary Government

- King's College

Secondary Aided

- St Joseph's College
- St Louis School

Secondary Direct Subsidy Scheme

- St Paul's College

Primary Private

- St. Louis School (Primary Section) (聖類斯中學（小學部）)

Eastern District

Secondary Aided

- Salesian English School (慈幼英文學校)

Primary Aided

- Pun U Association Wah Yan Primary School (番禺會所華仁小學)
- Salesian School (慈幼學校)

Southern District

Secondary Aided

- Aberdeen Technical School (香港仔工業學校)
- Hong Kong Sea School (香港航海學校)

Primary Direct Subsidy

- St Paul's College Primary School (聖保羅書院小學)

Special Aided

- HK Juvenile Care Centre Chan Nam Cheong Memorial School (香港青少年培育會陳南昌紀念學校)

Wan Chai District

Government Secondary

- Queen's College

Secondary Aided

- Hong Kong Tang King Po College (香港鄧鏡波書院)
- Wah Yan College, Hong Kong

Primary Aided

- St Joseph's Primary School (聖若瑟小學)

== Kowloon ==
Kowloon City District

Secondary Aided

- Chan Sui Ki (La Salle) College (陳瑞祺（喇沙）書院)
- La Salle College (喇沙書院)
- Tang King Po School (鄧鏡波學校)

Secondary Direct Subsidy

- Diocesan Boys' School (拔萃男書院)

Primary Aided

- La Salle Primary School (喇沙小學)

Primary Direct Subsidy

- Diocesan Boys' School (拔萃男書院)

Kwun Tong District

Secondary Government

- Kwun Tong Kung Lok Government Secondary School (觀塘功樂官立中學)

Secondary Aided

- Kwun Tong Maryknoll College (觀塘瑪利諾書院)
- Sing Yin Secondary School (聖言中學)
- St Joseph's Anglo-Chinese School (聖若瑟英文中學)

Primary Private

- St Joseph's Anglo-Chinese Primary School (聖若瑟英文小學)

Special Aided

- Society of Boys' Centres Shing Tak Centre School (香港扶幼會盛德中心學校)

Sham Shui Po District

Secondary Aided

- Cheung Sha Wan Catholic Secondary School (長沙灣天主教英文中學)

Secondary Direct Subsidy

- Ying Wa College (英華書院)

Primary Direct Subsidy

- Ying Wa Primary School (英華小學)

Special Aided

- The Society of Boys' Centres Hui Chung Sing Memorial School (香港扶幼會－許仲繩紀念學校)
- The Society of Boys' Centres Chak Yan Centre School (香港扶幼會則仁中心學校

Wong Tai Sin District

Secondary Aided

- Choi Hung Estate Catholic Secondary School (彩虹邨天主教英文中學)
- Ng Wah Catholic Secondary School (天主教伍華中學)

Yau Tsim Mong District

Secondary Aided

- St Francis Xavier's College (聖芳濟書院)
- Wah Yan College, Kowloon (華仁書院（九龍）)

Primary Aided

- Tak Sun School (德信學校)

== New Territories ==
East

Sha Tin District

- Tak Sun Secondary School (德信中學) (Secondary Direct Subsidy)

West

Kwai Tsing District

- Salesians of Don Bosco Ng Siu Mui Secondary School (天主教慈幼會伍少梅中學) (Secondary Aided)

Tsuen Wan District

- St Francis Xavier's School, Tsuen Wan (荃灣聖芳濟中學) (Secondary Aided)

Tuen Mun District

- Tung Wan Mok Law Shui Wah School (東灣莫羅瑞華學校) (Special Aided)

== Former ==
Became coeducational

- Lung Cheung Government Secondary Technical School (Secondary Government)

Closed

- Sheung Kwai Chung Government Secondary School (上葵涌官立中學) (Secondary Government)

== See also ==
- List of girls' schools in Hong Kong
- List of boys' schools in the United Kingdom (Hong Kong was formerly a UK territory)
