= The Old Ride School =

Independent school in England

Coordinates: 51.359°N 2.257°W

The Old Ride School (previously called The Old Ride Preparatory School) was an independent school in England, first at Canford Cliffs just outside Bournemouth, then Little Horwood, Buckinghamshire, and later at Bradford on Avon, Wiltshire.

== History ==
The school was founded in 1885 by Gerard Rogers at Canford Cliffs, just outside Bournemouth. Rogers was only 27; pupil numbers grew rapidly and many scholarships were won. He drowned around 1920 while swimming off the local beach and was succeeded as head by his deputy, Sydney Phillips, who ran the school until his death in 1930. He in turn was succeeded by the Reverend Thomas Flynn.

After the difficult years of early 1930s the school prospered but then war came, France fell and all the South Coast was considered a likely German invasion area. Numbers fell rapidly and the school was obliged to evacuate to East Devon for the duration.

It never returned to Bournemouth as the premises there were considered too small and cramped, so a large building was bought at Little Horwood in North Bucks when the war ended. However, 14 years later The Old Ride was forced to move again when a plan was drawn up by British Rail to extend the nearby station into a huge marshalling yard which would have meant acquiring virtually all the school grounds. Subsequent to the school's move this plan was scrapped.

The school therefore finally settled at Bradford on Avon in Wiltshire, where it amalgamated with a similar prep school, Kingwell Court, whose headmaster had just left. This building, originally Frankleigh House, was early Victorian but with some surviving sections believed to be Tudor. The merged schools retained the name of The Old Ride but for a while kept their separate uniforms: red caps for The Old Ride and purple for Kingwell Court.

The Rev. Thomas Flynn died in 1962 and was succeeded as headmaster by his son, Mark Flynn; until then the school had had only three headmasters in 77 years. After a further 19 years the headship was taken on by Jeremy Willder in May 1981. He was a graduate of Christ Church, Oxford whereas all four previous heads had been graduates of Corpus Christi College.

Girls were first admitted to the school in 1982.

The tradition of The Old Ride was for children to be awarded 'plus and minus' points for good or bad work or behaviour. Those receiving one hundred pluses in a term would go on the Plus Outing with the headmaster and his wife. The four houses, for many years, were called Nations: Britons, Spartans, Trojans and Vikings. Children were required to carry a comb and handkerchief with them at all times.

The school closed in 1990 after attendance figures dropped dramatically, following adverse inspection reports.

In 2002, a former science teacher, Peter Hamilton-Leggett, was charged with having molested several students in the 1970s and 1980s. He was given a gaol sentence in 2003.

== Later uses ==
A Rudolf Steiner school, The Orchard School, occupied part of The Old Ride's premises until it was forced to relocate to Holt due to financial difficulties. The buildings were left in disrepair until a group of families bought them in 1995, and have since been divided into ten individually owned apartments.
