= Kingwell Court Preparatory School =

Information
- School type: Boarding school
- Established: 1936
- Closed: 1990
- Gender: Boys

Kingwell Court Preparatory School was a British boarding school for boys.

The school was housed in a remodelled Tudor home near Bradford-on-Avon, Wiltshire and prepared boys for the Common Entrance Exam to enter a public school. The school opened in 1936.

Kingwell Court School merged with The Old Ride School, which moved from its original home at Little Horwood, Buckinghamshire, in 1959. Boys from The Old Ride joined the Kingwell Court boys in a combined school, renamed "The Old Ride" in the winter term of 1959.

The school closed down in 1990. Its building, Frankleigh House, is now in residential use.
