= Littlemoss =

Suburb of Droylsden, Greater Manchester, England

Coordinates: 53.492°N 2.131°W

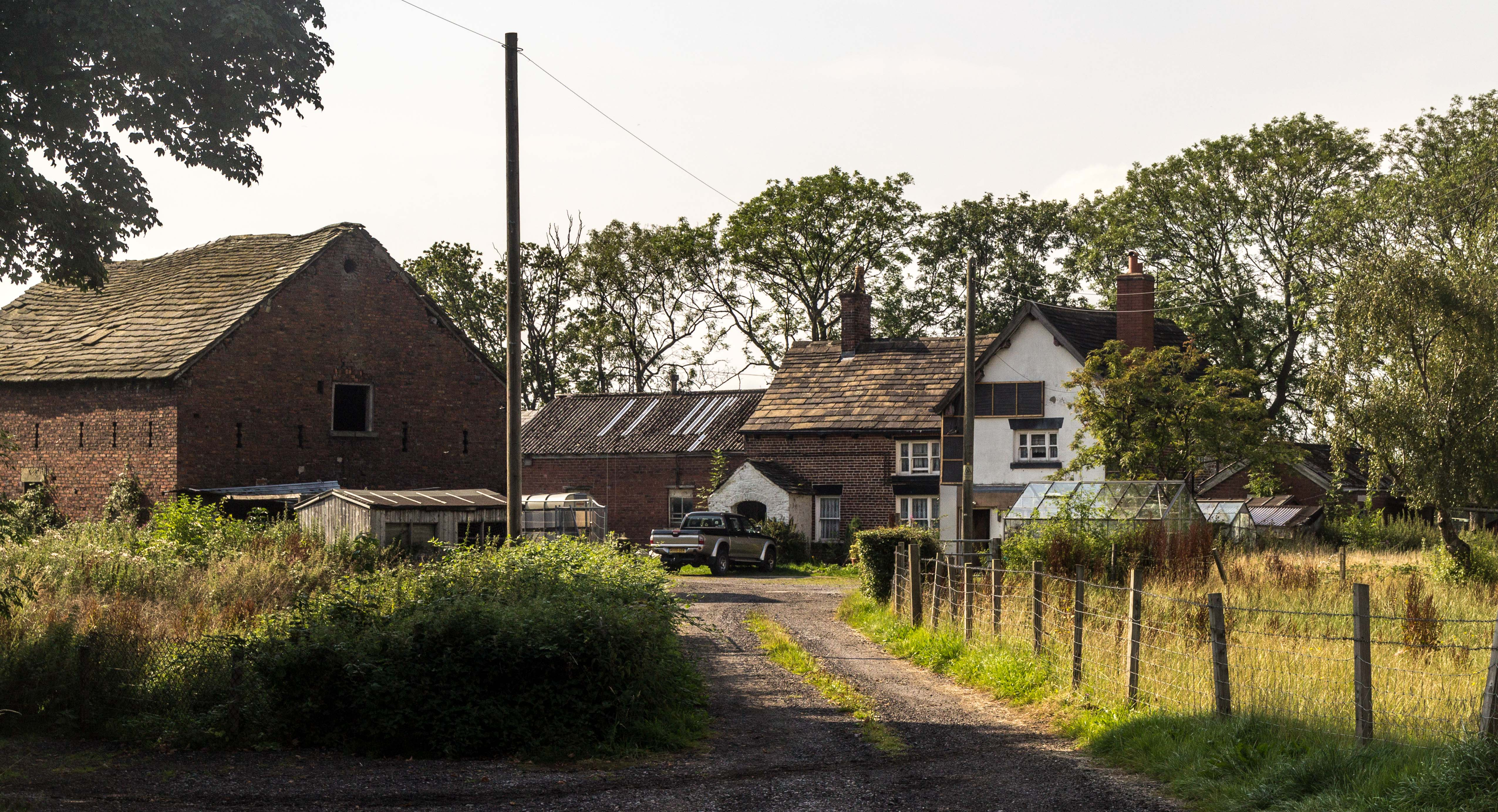
- Cinderland Hall Farm

- Location within Greater Manchester
- OS grid reference: SJ913995
- Metropolitan borough: Tameside
- Metropolitan county: Greater Manchester
- Region: North West
- Country: England
- Sovereign state: United Kingdom
- Post town: MANCHESTER
- Postcode district: M43
- Dialling code: 0161
- Police: Greater Manchester
- Fire: Greater Manchester
- Ambulance: North West
- UK Parliament: Ashton-under-Lyne

Littlemoss is a suburb of Droylsden, in the Tameside district, in the county of Greater Manchester, England.

Littlemoss village is predominantly a farming area comprising Cinderland Hall Farm (dating back to the 17th century), Buckley Hill Farm, Willow Bank Farm, Jaum Farm and Gravel Hill Farm and a few others. It comprises mainly Lumb Lane, Back Lane, Cross Lane, Andrew Street, Hyde Street, Wayne Close, Brookside Close, Brookland and Woodleigh and Wayne Close and The Stables Estate and the Maunder's estate.

== History ==
On 31 December 1894 Little Moss became a civil parish, being formed from part of Ashton under Lyne, on 1 April 1954 the parish was abolished and merged with Ashton under Lyne, Failsworth and Droylsden. In 1951 the parish had a population of 1623.

Littlemoss used to have about four shops and two public houses and a post office, which were eventually converted to houses. There was also a Co-op, which later became an antique shop before being converted into apartments.

In the 1970s proposals were made to build houses on the land, but a petition was raised and many signatures obtained, so subsequently, saving the green fields.

In 1977, the Queen's Silver Jubilee was celebrated on the public playing field off Andrew Street, with a gala and fair, with donkey cart rides provided by Reg Cook from Cinderland Hall Farm, who still resided there in 2013, with his wife, Margaret.

In around the year 2000, the M60 Manchester ring road motorway was completed, cutting through Littlemoss, to which a fair amount of grazing land and some properties were lost, including the 'Army Camp' which had been converted into stables and horse grazing. Several buildings including the 'back to front houses' off Lumb Lane, were also demolished at this time.

The Littlemoss Boys' School was demolished in 2012 and by 2013 the school playing field was used for grazing cattle. There were proposals to build more houses on the site, despite lack of support from residents.

== Amenities ==
Littlemoss has a high school called Littlemoss High School On that side now resides Laurus Ryecroft a mixed secondary school with a sixth form.
