= Sam Millar =

Northern Ireland writer and playwright

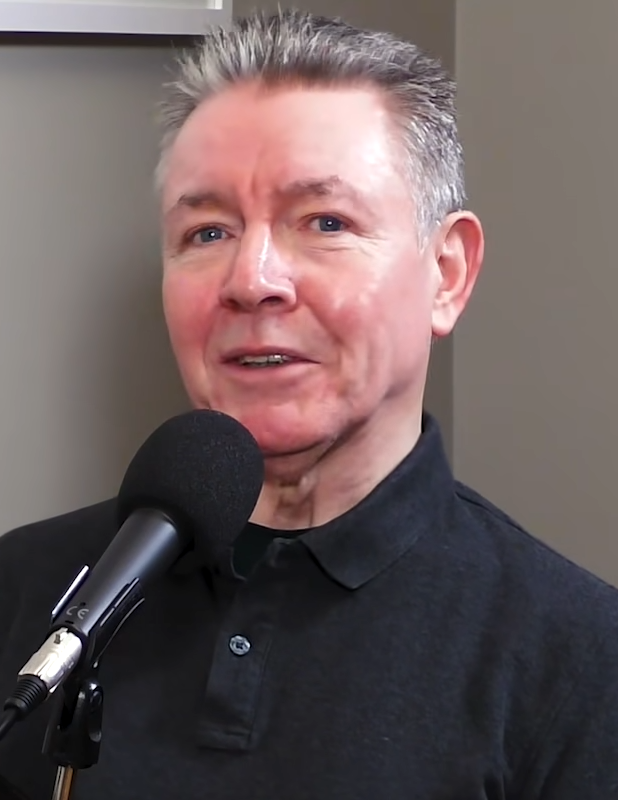
- Millar in 2022
- Born: 1955 (age 70–71); Belfast, Northern Ireland
- Occupation: Crime writer
- Organization: Provisional Irish Republican Army
- Known for: 1993 Brink's robbery, Rochester, New York
- Notable work: On The Brinks (2003)
- Status: Convicted (1994)
- Motive: Personal financial gain
- Conviction: Possession of cash derived from robbery
- Criminal charges: Possession of proceeds of robbery
- Penalty: 60 months' imprisonment
- Accomplices: Thomas O'Connor; "Marco" (unidentified)

Details
- Date: 5 January 1993
- Country: United States
- State: New York
- Location: Rochester, New York
- Target: Brink's armoured car depot
- Weapon: Firearms
- Date apprehended: November 1993

Sam Millar (born 1955) is a crime writer and playwright from Belfast, Northern Ireland. A former volunteer in the Provisional Irish Republican Army (IRA), he was imprisoned at HM Prison Maze during the late 1970s and 1980s, where he took part in the blanket protest. After his release, he emigrated to the United States, where in January 1993 he carried out an armed robbery at a Brink's security depot in Rochester, New York, stealing $7.4 million in what federal authorities described as one of the largest armoured car robberies in American history. He was convicted in 1994 of possessing proceeds of the robbery and served a prison sentence, part of which was completed in Northern Ireland under a prisoner transfer arrangement. He returned to Belfast following his release in 1997 and subsequently pursued a career as a writer, publishing a memoir of his experiences, On The Brinks, in 2003, as well as a series of crime novels.

== Biography ==
=== Provisional IRA ===
As a youth, Millar attended St Patrick's College, Belfast on Antrim Road, in Belfast, where classmates included Joe Doherty, Maxie Maxwell, Hugh Connolly, and Tommy Denver. Millar joined the Provisional Irish Republican Army (IRA) around the age of 15 after first seeing the events of Bloody Sunday and then, a few days after Bloody Sunday, learning a friend of his had been killed by the security forces, though it is not known whether this killing was committed by the Royal Ulster Constabulary, British Army or Military Reaction Force

As a volunteer in the IRA, he was involved in the blanket protests of the mid-1970s, when special category status was removed for republican prisoners in Northern Ireland's jails and detention centres. According to a 2003 interview with The Irish Times, Millar was the first person to be sentenced under the non-jury Diplock courts, receiving three years for IRA membership, and was subsequently imprisoned again in 1976 after being caught with explosives in central Belfast.

He was one of the first prisoners to join the dirty protest, and among the last to abandon it. When the hunger strikes ended in 1981, he was one of six prisoners who refused to come off the protest. He remained on the blanket until September 1983, when an IRA leader persuaded him to stand down in order not to jeopardise the planned mass escape from the Maze.

In a 2022 video interview with Scottish YouTube personality James English, Millar claimed that during his incarceration in HM Prison Maze, he and other Irish republican prisoners were subjected to extensive intimidation, interrogation and beatings.

=== United States and the Rochester robbery ===
After being released from the Maze Prison, Millar relocated to the United States. He subsequently found work as a croupier in illegal casinos in New York City, rising through the ranks of the operation over a number of years. During this period, he came to know Thomas O'Connor, a former Rochester police officer then working as a security guard at a Brink's depot in Rochester, New York. O'Connor showed Millar around the facility, and Millar later stated that he was struck by what he described as a serious lack of security at the depot.

On 5 January 1993, Millar and an accomplice he identified only as "Marco" carried out an armed robbery at the Brink's depot in Rochester, making off with $7.4 million in what federal authorities described as the fifth-largest armoured car robbery in United States history at that time.

The robbery took approximately seven minutes in total. Millar later stated that he and Marco discarded between $3 million and $4 million at the scene after the weight of the cash caused the getaway van's engine to overheat. O'Connor was taken briefly as a hostage before being released en route back to New York City.

Federal investigators suspected the robbery was an inside job with O'Connor's involvement, in part because he initially provided inconsistent details and later refused to cooperate with investigators or undergo a polygraph test. Authorities also initially suspected that a portion of the proceeds was intended for the IRA, though Millar has consistently denied this, stating: "The money was never going to Ireland; it was going to me".

In the months following the robbery, neighbours in the Jackson Heights area of Queens described Millar as a quiet family man who drove an old minivan. During this period he spent freely, taking family holidays, opening a comic book shop called KAC Comics and Collectibles, and purchasing rare editions and a new Ford Explorer. Investigators later matched a tyre track found at the Brink's depot to Millar's minivan.

In November 1993, Millar was arrested alongside the Rev. Patrick Moloney, an Irish-born priest based in the East Village. O'Connor was also arrested. Approximately $2 million, largely in $20 bills, was recovered by federal agents from an apartment in the Stuyvesant Town-Peter Cooper Village development where Millar had been storing the cash. A further $168,000 was recovered from a safe at Bonitas House, Father Moloney's East Village ministry.

Following a seven-week trial in Rochester in late 1994, Millar and Father Moloney were convicted of possessing cash derived from the robbery. O'Connor was acquitted. Millar was sentenced to 60 months in federal prison. The main charges against both Millar and Moloney had been thrown out on a jurisdictional technicality: because the arrests were made in New York City, the defendants were constitutionally entitled to have the case heard there rather than in Rochester. No one was ever convicted of the actual robbery itself, and no charges can now be brought as the statute of limitations expired in 1998.

During the Clinton administration, Millar was permitted to serve the remainder of his sentence in a prison in Northern Ireland under a prisoner transfer programme and was released in November 1997. At the time of the 2016 New York Times investigation, at least $5.2 million from the robbery remained unaccounted for. Millar has maintained that the outstanding funds were in the custody of a lawyer associated with Marco, who claimed the money (approximately $5 million) had been stolen by a cocaine-addicted acquaintance. Retired FBI agent Dale Anderson, the robbery's chief investigator, described this account as "a little far-fetched".

Ronnie Gibbons, a prizefighter and figure in Manhattan nightlife circles who was acquainted with Millar, told associates that he had helped plan the robbery but withdrew before it took place because guns were to be used. Friends of Gibbons stated that he later drove upstate to confront O'Connor over the proceeds and was never seen alive again. In 1999, a dismembered body was found washed up on the shore of Lake Ontario; it was not identified as Gibbons's remains until 2011.

=== Later life ===
In 2003, Millar published a memoir of his experiences, titled On The Brinks, through Wynkin deWorde. The book's account of the robbery was disputed by the FBI's lead investigator, retired special agent Paul Hawkins, who stated: "The facts don't support what he has to say in the book." The film rights to the memoir were subsequently acquired by Focus Features.

Since the Good Friday Agreement in 1998, he has been a vocal critic of Sinn Féin, and has been critical of the Adams-McGuinness leadership of the party.

Millar has been critical of the Israeli government's policies regarding Palestine, especially in the Gaza Strip. He has compared the military actions of the Israel Defense Forces in Gaza to Nazism.

He resides in Belfast, Northern Ireland, as of 2024.

== Bibliography ==
- Dark Souls
- On the Brinks
- The Redemption Factory
- The Darkness of Bones
- Bloodstorm : A Karl Kane Book
- The Dark Place : A Karl Kane Book
- The Dead of Winter : A Karl Kane Book
- Small Town Killing
- Brothers in Arms (stage play)
- The Bespoke Hitman
