= Bure Park Specialist Academy =

Coordinates: 52.6245°N 1.7304°E

Location
- 16a Keyes Avenue; Great Yarmouth, Norfolk, NR30 4AE; England

Information
- Type: Special school
- Established: 2021
- Department for Education URN: 148572 Tables
- Ofsted: Reports
- Head teacher: Hayley Ross
- Gender: Boys
- Age: 6 to 16
- Enrollment: 64 (April 2025)
- Website: https://www.bureparkacademy.co.uk/

Bure Park Specialist Academy is a special school in Great Yarmouth, Norfolk, England. It educates boys aged 6 to 16 with social, emotional and mental health needs, offering day and residential places. The school is part of Broad Horizons Education Trust.

Bure Park Specialist Academy was established as part of Norfolk County Council's SEND Transformation Project. It has a capacity of 88 students. The school opened in September 2021 on the former site of Alderman Swindell Primary School.

The school was rated 'good' by Ofsted in November 2023.

== Incidents ==
In June 2024, the BBC reported that Bure Park Specialist Academy had recorded a number of pupil-related incidents, including 88 assaults towards members of staff and 42 cases of students climbing onto the school rooftops. Broad Horizons Education Trust acknowledged the "very challenging behaviour" presented by the students as a result of their special educational needs, and stated that all of the pupils who climbed on the roofs were unharmed.

A teaching assistant was hospitalised after an incident with a student in January 2025.
