= St Anthony's School, Hampstead =

St. Anthony's School

Location
- 90 Fitzjohn's Ave; London, NW3 6NP; England; 51°33′14″N 0°10′34″W

Information
- Type: Preparatory day school
- Religious affiliation: Roman Catholic
- Established: 1898
- Local authority: Camden
- Department for Education URN: 100070 Tables
- Headmaster: Richard Berlie
- Gender: Boys
- Age: 4 to 13
- Enrolment: 285~
- Former pupils: Old Anthonians
- Website: www.stanthonysprep.org.uk

St. Anthony's School is a Catholic preparatory school in Hampstead, London for boys aged 4 to 13, and co-educational nursery for children aged 2.5 to 4.

== History ==
St. Anthony's was founded in Eastbourne in 1898 by the Patton family. It moved to its current location in Hampstead, London shortly after World War II. In 2023, it was acquired by the Inspired Education Group.

== Campus ==
The school occupies a pair of large houses at 90 Fitzjohn's Ave and 1 Arkwright Rd in Hampstead, North London.

== Curriculum ==
The curriculum is based on Roman Catholic teaching. In addition to the core subjects of English, Mathematics, Science and ICT the following subjects are taught from Year 1: French, Mandarin, R.S., Latin, History, Geography, Art, Design Technology. Robotics has also been introduced into the curriculum.

== Awards and recognition ==
In 2019 the school was rated "excellent" in all areas by the Independent Schools Inspectorate
