= Aberdare Girls' School =

Secondary school in Wales

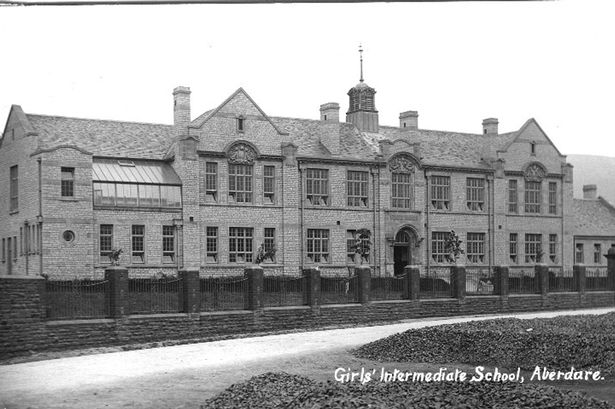

Location
- Heol Cwmbach; Aberdare, CF44 0NF; Wales
- Coordinates: 51.715°N 3.440°W

Information
- Motto: Oni heuir, ni fedir (You cannot reap unless you sow)
- Established: 1913
- Closed: July 2014
- Local authority: Rhondda Cynon Taf
- Website: www.aberdaregirls.co.uk

Aberdare Girls' School was a state secondary school for girls aged 11–18 in the town of Aberdare, Rhondda Cynon Taf, Wales. It closed in July 2014.

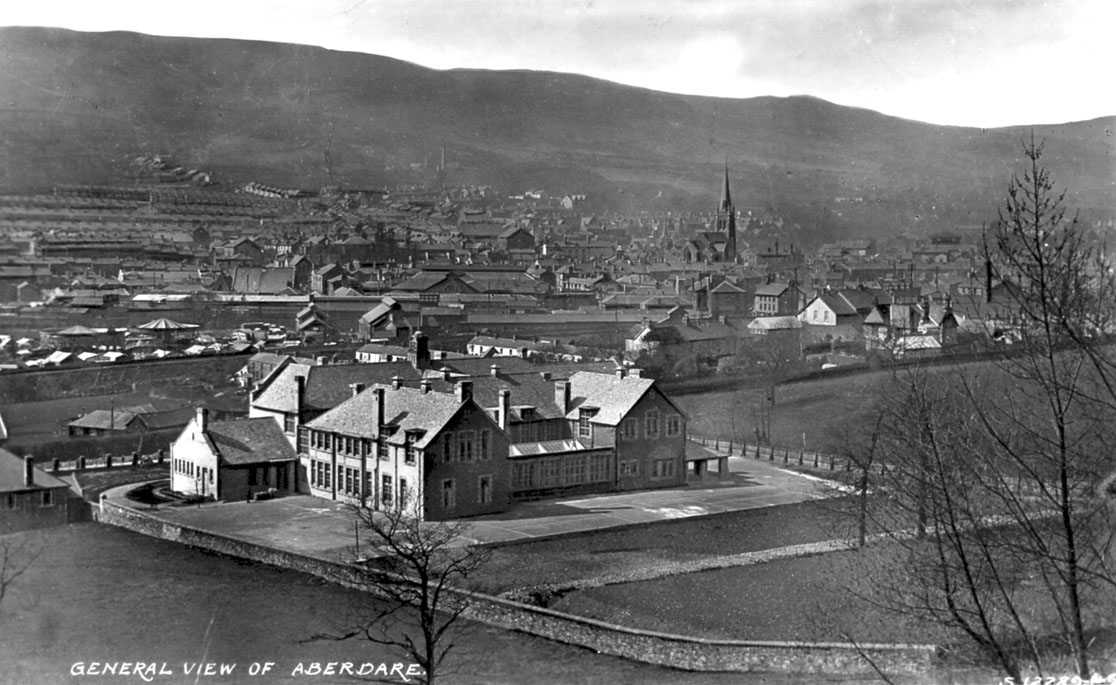
The back of the original school building is in the front of this picture of Aberdare. The other blocks, e.g. used for science and cookery, were added around the playground later.

== History ==
The school was founded as an Intermediate Girls' school, and the building was opened in 1913. It became a secondary school for girls aged 11 to 18.

== Structure ==
There were approximately 700 pupils on the school roll, of whom around 100 were in the sixth form, at the school's closure in 2014. The school occupied two sites, with pupils in years 7 and 8 in the Lower School in Y Gadlys, and those in years 9 to 13 in the Upper School in Plasdraw.

Most pupils came from the town of Aberdare, with some travelling from Glynneath, Treorchy and Mountain Ash.

== Bangle controversy ==
In 2007, the school attracted media coverage across Britain after it excluded a student, Sarika Watkins-Singh, for wearing a kara, a bangle that symbolised her Sikh faith. The student and her family took legal action. In January 2008, Rhondda Cynon Taf County Borough Council informed school governors that it would not provide the school with any further financial assistance, and said that this was in response to the school pursuing the case. The human rights organisation 'Liberty' claimed that the school was in violation of the Race Relations Act 1976, the Equality Act 2006. In July 2008, Watkins-Singh won her case when the high court determined that the school was guilty of indirect discrimination. The school said that she would be welcome back at the school if she so desired.

== Aberdare Community School ==
It was announced in 2012 that Aberdare High School, Aberdare Girls' School and Blaengwawr Comprehensive School would merge to form a new 'super-school', which became Aberdare Community School. The construction of the new £50m campus began on the Michael Sobell Sports Centre site in 2013 with the intentions of creating a unified education, leisure and community hub. After several delays, the intended September 2014 opening date of the new 1,600 pupil building was pushed back to April 2015 with the formation of Aberdare Community School still set for September 2014. Blaengwawr Comprehensive, Aberdare High and Aberdare Girls' schools were closed at the end of the Summer Term 2014. It was announced that due to delays of the new campus, the four buildings previously occupied by the three schools would temporarily house various school years until a gradual move is possible once the new building is completed 2015.

== Sale for development ==
In July 2015, the 1.16 hectares (2.9 acres) school site was sold at auction for £415,000, four times the guide price. The unknown purchasers were bound by a covenant to ensure that the site could only be used as a school and a playground. By 2020 the site had been converted to housing, retaining the original school building.
