= Lady Mary Hamilton =

Scottish novelist

- Born: 8 May 1736; Melville House, Fife, Scotland
- Died: 28 February 1821 (aged 84); Brompton, Middlesex, England
- Spouses: Dr. James Walker; George Robinson Hamilton
- Father: Alexander Leslie, 5th Earl of Leven
- Mother: Elizabeth Monypenny

Lady Mary Hamilton or Lady Mary Walker (née Leslie; 8 May 1736 – 29 February 1821) was a Scottish novelist of the 18th century. She was the youngest daughter of Alexander Leslie, 5th Earl of Leven and the mother of James Walker, a Rear admiral in the British Royal Navy.

Her works included discussions of philosophy, education and art. Advanced in thinking for the time period, she was a strong advocate of education for women. Her most successful novel, Munster Village (1778), centres on a utopian garden city populated with fallen women and females escaping disastrous marriages. Jane Austen may have been influenced by her writings, taking the same names as some of Lady Mary's characters.

== Family and personal life ==
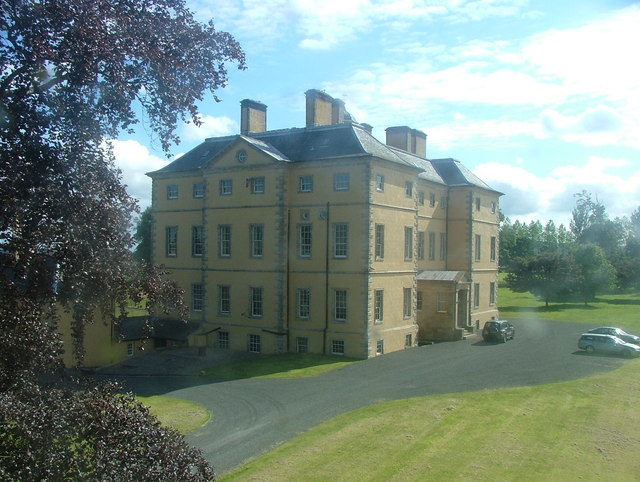
Melville House, Lady Mary's birthplace

Lady Mary Leslie was born at Melville House, Fife, Scotland on 8 May 1736, the youngest daughter of Alexander Leslie, fifth earl of Leven and Melville, by his second wife Elizabeth, daughter of David Monypenny.

On 3 January 1762, Lady Mary was married to Dr. James Walker of Innerdovat, Fife. He was a physician based at Edinburgh's prison infirmary and heavily in debt. Though the marriage was unhappy, it was said to have produced ten children. At least half must have died in infancy; the Scots Peerage, followed by McMillan, asserts three sons and one daughter though other sources point to two Walker daughters, Isabella (Bell) and Elizabeth (Betzy). (A grandson, Baron Adolphe Thiébault, raised questions about the paternity of Lady Mary's children, in an 1863 history.) Lady Mary was estranged from Walker, who moved alone to Jamaica in the 1770s to take up a position there as a prison physician.

Lady Mary turned to writing to provide for her family. She would later note to a friend that "with a family of young children… abandoned by their father," she was forced to "cloth, feed, and educate them". She thus needed to support herself, producing her first novel Letters from the Duchesse de Crui (1777).

Lady Mary had an affair with George Musgrave MP for Carlisle and together they had two children, Elizabeth born in 1767 and George born in 1769. Both children were brought up and married with the surname Walker. In 1816, by a private act of Parliament, both were acknowledged by their father and adopted the surname Musgrave. Lady Mary's Grandson the Rev George Musgrave Musgrave of Borden had been baptised George Musgrave Walker in Marylebone on the 25 July 1798. Elizabeth had married General Paul Thiébaut in Paris on 21 November 1793 but was divorced by 21 July 1804 to allow Paul Thiebaut to marry Elizabeth Chenais in Tours. When George Musgrave MP wrote his will in 1822, his daughter was living with him in his house on Green Street, Marylebone, as Elizabeth Musgrave. In James Maclean's 1963 book "Reward is Secondary" about the "Political Adventurer" Lauchlin Macleane it is suggested that Lauchlin was living with Lady Mary and she was pregnant when he left on his last trip to India. Lauchlin drowned when his ship went down on his 1778 return trip in the bay of Biscay. Lady Mary's son Lt Col Leslie Walker was born in 1778 and died in 1840.

Lady Mary was introduced by her husband to George Robinson Hamilton and – accounts vary – sometime after Walker's death, (alternatively, without divorcing Walker) she went away with or married Hamilton, a cousin of Alexander Hamilton, 10th Duke of Hamilton and owner of a sugar plantation in Jamaica. She took Hamilton's name, and she and George settled in Lille, France in 1782, where he is described as a cloth merchant and they as living in great style. Two of her daughters with Walker, Isabelle and Betzy, married respectively the dramatist Victor-Joseph Étienne de Jouy and General Paul Thiébaut. Again, accounts vary: Lady Mary had two daughters with Hamilton, or had at least one surviving daughter with Hamilton, Sophia Saint John Hamilton Alderson.

George Hamilton died on 29 October 1797, and an analysis of his will demonstrates both that he and Mary were not married, and that James Walker was still alive in 1786. Hamilton made over all of his estates to Lady Mary, with the stipulation that the Jamaica estates were to be run for Mary's benefit by James Hope-Johnstone, 3rd Earl of Hopetoun and Alexander Leslie-Melville, 7th Earl of Leven (Mary's nephew).

After Hamilton's death, Lady Mary lived near Amiens, where she was very close to the writer Sir Herbert Croft. Croft was an eccentric English scholar who had compiled dictionaries, and the two lived there together as friends. Her daughter Bell and son-in-law Jouy visited them often. Croft introduced her to his secretary, Charles Nodier. Nodier translated Munster Village and helped her write another book in French, La famille du duc de Popoli or The Duc de Popoli (1810).

Despite her extensive holdings in Jamaica, little or no income was earned from them and the Croft household was poor. In 1815, (in alternate sources, at age 75) she went to Jamaica, as she believed she was being cheated financially out of some of her husband's estates, which had produced £3000 per annum but were now yielding £400. After her return – Croft having died in April 1816 – she lived with her daughter Sophia Alderson, who was widowed. Lady Mary died in Brompton, Middlesex near London on 28 February 1821, although some sources such as McMillan specify an 1822 date of death. The discrepancy may arise out of a delay in proving Lady Mary's will, which took until 5 July 1822 to be settled in favour of Sophia and her son Lieutenant-Colonel Leslie Walker. Her son James Walker, a Royal Navy officer, achieved the rank of Rear-Admiral.

A final conjecture concerning Lady Mary and her daughter Sophia is made by Wicks, that Sophia may have had an illegitimate daughter in 1805, fathered by Ugo Foscolo, and that the child, Floriana, was adopted and raised by Lady Mary (leaving Sophia free to marry). On Mary's death, Floriana was entrusted to the care of her father, and some or all of Sophia's inheritance was directed to Foscolo to provide for Floriana. That Ugo and Sophia had a daughter is supported by Traversa; and analysed, doubted but not discounted by Vincent. If true, then a corollary is that Lady Mary and family lived for some time in Valenciennes, before moving to Amiens.

== Literary analysis ==
Her most successful work, Munster Village (1778), centres on a utopian garden city and features themes of intellectual equality, especially in marriage. Historian Dorothy McMillan writes that "the novel was one of the earlier works of the period to feature an ideal community". Hamilton creates the village from scratch and it is populated by fallen women and females escaping disastrous marriages. The community survives because it is driven by the exchange of kindness. Christine Rees has termed it "a drama of family relationships" which features the strong "moral sentiment" common to many 18th-century writers. However McMillan argues that "the writing is marred by sententiousness and relentless intellectual name-dropping".

Contemporary reviews of her books were in the main very favourable. The Critical Review, edited by Tobias Smollett, met the publication of the Letters from the Duchesse de Crui with high approbation – "the solidity of her remarks might do honour to those of the opposite sex" – and were equally approving of Memoirs of the Marchioness de Louvoi. The Monthly Review commends the "just observations, useful reflections and pertinent allusions to natural and civil history" found in Memoirs of the Marchioness de Louvoi. However its review of The Life of Mrs. Justman is scathing, speaking of the "absurd, incoherent and contradictory political reasoning with which these volumes abound" and finding its best feature to be that 75 pages of the manuscript were destroyed by fire.

Lady Mary's writings included discussions of philosophy, education and art. However, McMillan posits that her works "have little to offer modern readers" and The Cambridge Guide to Women's Writing in English has critiqued her stories for plagiarizing from others. Alessa Johns also notes the plagiarism but argues that rather than be a self-serving attribute, it reflects Lady Mary's view of a "public-spirited will to share and democratize" ideas and a sincere form of flattery. Indeed, one of her characters in Letters from the Duchesse de Crui says to not call her "a plagiarist... from whatever author I may have borrowed them, I shall give their names, when I recollect them: but to trace the origin of my ideas, would be an endless task".

Nevertheless, Lady Mary's views on marriage and equality show that she was advanced for her time period. She was a strong advocate of women's education. Hamilton's stories may have influenced Jane Austen, as the English author included several of Hamilton's names in her works: Bennet and Bingley in Pride and Prejudice, and Dashwood in Sense and Sensibility. Johns observes that Hamilton's feminist utopian ideas also influenced Mary Wollstonecraft and Catharine Macaulay.

A collection of her papers is held by Yale University Library.

== Works ==
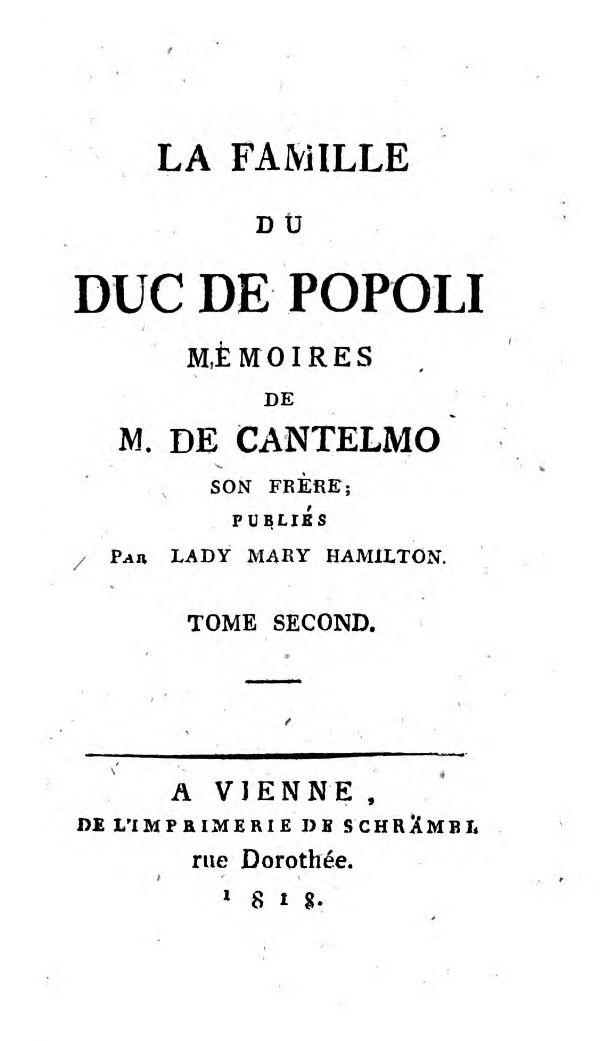
Title Page from an 1818 publication of The Duc de Popoli

She published the following works:

1. Letters from the Duchesse de Crui, 1777
2. Memoirs of the Marchioness de Louvoi, 1777
3. Munster Village, 1778
4. The Life of Mrs. Justman, 1782
5. The Duc de Popoli, 1810
