= Chris Baur =

Scottish broadcast journalist (1942–2026)

Christopher Frank Baur (28 May 1942 – 23 January 2026) was a Scottish broadcast journalist. Between 1985 and 1988, he was the editor of The Scotsman newspaper.

== Early life and education ==
Baur was born on 28 May 1942 in Oxted, Surrey, but was raised in Scotland from the age of three. He was educated at Dalhousie Preparatory School and Strathallan School in Perthshire, Scotland.

== Career ==
Baur joined The Scotsman as a copy boy in 1960 and trained as a journalist, becoming the industrial reporter in 1963 as well as covering Scottish politics from 1972.

In 1973 he was appointed Scottish correspondent of the Financial Times and political correspondent of BBC Scotland. During this period, he made a programme for BBC Two called "Power of Scotland" which won the Royal Television Society's Journalism Award for the 'best current affairs documentary programme' of 1978.

In 1978 he became an assistant editor at The Scotsman, writing on politics and economic affairs. Between 1983 and 1988 he was its deputy editor, then editor. From 1988 to 1994 he again worked at the Financial Times.

Between 1990 and 1994 he was also the editor of Scottish Business Insider and became managing director of the Edinburgh-based Insider Group – a subsidiary of Trinity Mirror. Baur was one of the team of four directors who sold Scottish Business Insider magazine and its spin-offs to the Daily Record in 2001.

== Death ==
Baur died on 23 January 2026, at the age of 83.
