= Marylebone Academy =

Location
- North Wharf Road; City of Westminster, London, W2 1QZ; England; 51.5189366°N 0.1774226°W

Information
- Type: Academy
- Motto: The best in everyone
- Established: 3 September 2014
- Local authority: Westminster
- Trust: United Learning
- Department for Education URN: 140884 Tables
- Ofsted: Reports
- Chair of Governors: Dr Margaret Mountford
- Principal: Mr L Thomas
- Gender: Girls and Boys
- Age: 11 to 18
- Website: www.maryleboneacademy.org.uk

Marylebone Academy was founded by parents, teachers and residents of Marylebone in Central London. It opened on Wednesday 3 September 2014 in temporary accommodation in Priory Park Road, London NW6 7UJ, but later moved to a permanent site in North Wharf Road, near Paddington Station.

The secondary school is for girls and boys aged 11 – 16 years, then there is a sixth form, 200 metres away for pupils aged 16 – 18 years.

== History and location ==
The main school building was opened in 2014 as a new, purpose-built secondary school, with a separate sixth form centre opened in November 2021.

The school was inspected by Ofsted in 2022 and judged to be Good.

World renowned classicist Mary Beard visited the school's classics department in 2022.

In February 2026, the school joined the United Learning Trust. The school (formally known as Marylebone Boys' School) changed its name in September 2026 and will welcome girls into Year 7 in September 2027.

== GCSE Results ==
75 per cent of the pupils received a grade 5-9 in English and Math, 27 per cent of all grades awarded were 9 or 8, 43 per cent of all grades awarded were 9-7. In English, 88 per cent of pupils were awarded a 9-5 grade, In Maths, 82 per cent of pupils were awarded a 9-5 grade, In Science, 76 per cent of pupils were awarded a 9-5 grade.
