= Littlemoss High School =

Littlemoss High School for Boys

Location
- Cryer Street; Droylsden, Greater Manchester, M43 7LF; England
- Coordinates: 53.4929°N 2.1332°W

Information
- Type: Comprehensive school
- Closed: 2009
- Local authority: Tameside
- Specialist: Business and Enterprise
- Department for Education URN: 106262 Tables
- Ofsted: Reports
- Staff: 55
- Gender: Boys
- Age: 11 to 16
- Enrolment: 554 pupils
- Website: https://web.archive.org/web/20071110140542/http://www.littlemoss.tameside.sch.uk/

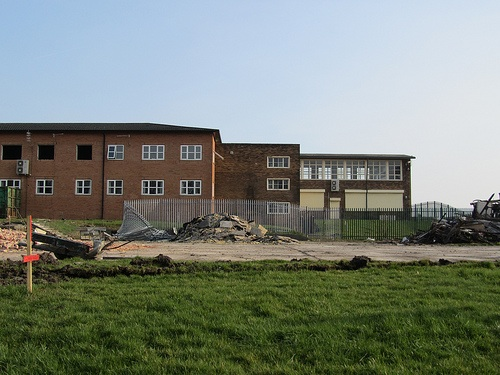
Littlemoss High School, during demolition.

Littlemoss High School for Boys was a comprehensive school in Littlemoss, Droylsden, Tameside, England. It merged with Droylsden High School, Mathematics and Computing College for Girls in September 2009 to become Droylsden Academy.

Prior to the merger it educated about 550 boys and held specialist Business and Enterprise College status.

== Academic standards ==
The school was under special measures from March 1998 until July 2002.

After their March 2004 inspection Ofsted reported that "This is a good, effective school that has been very successful in improving the areas of weakness identified in the previous report. Very good leadership, together with the significant improvements in teaching and learning and in pupils’ behaviour, has improved standards overall, although standards are still below average." They rated the school Good, point three on a seven-point scale.

== Awards and mentions ==
- Schools Achievement Award and Sportsmark in 2002.
- Mentioned in Parliament as a member of the Peacemaker Consultation Programme.

== Notable teachers ==
Sarah Joynes was awarded a distinction in the North West Guardian Award for Teacher of the Year in a Secondary School in 2007.

In July 2008, Science teacher Chris Hilton disappeared on holiday in the French Alps. His body was discovered 7 months later in February 2009.

== Notable alumni ==
- Howard Donald of Take That, attended Littlemoss High School between 1979 and 1984
- Dale Cregan, murderer, attended in the 90's
- Austin Cooke, FTSE 100 Business Leader, Howdens, Poundland, KFC Global, Phones 4u, attended in the 90’s

== Notes ==
The photograph showing of the school prior to demolition is not Littlemoss School. The photograph is of Manor Road Girls School. Please update as this misinformation is now being shared on social media post in error.
