= St Patrick's College, Belfast =

Coordinates: 54.631°N 5.937°W

St Patrick's College
- 116 Antrim Road, Belfast; Northern Ireland

Information
- Type: Catholic High School
- Motto: Pro deo et patria (For God and country)
- Established: 1956
- Chairman of the Governing Board: Very Rev. M. Sheehan
- Headmistress: Paula Stuart, B.Sc. M.Sc. D.A.S.E. P.G.C.E.
- Gender: single gender, all male
- Age: 11 to 18
- Enrolment: Approx. 900
- Houses: 3
- Colours: Gold, Green and Black
- Website: stpatrickscollege.net

St Patrick's College, Bearnageeha was a Roman Catholic secondary school for boys aged between 11 and 19 situated on the Antrim Road, Belfast, Northern Ireland.

The college's catchment area encompassed the New Lodge, Ardoyne, the Antrim Road and various other areas of North Belfast. In 2006, St Patrick's celebrated its golden jubilee. St Patrick's was the first Catholic secondary school in Belfast to offer A-Levels.

The school was amalgamated in 2017 with Little Flower Catholic School to form Blessed Trinity College after all legal appeals to the amalgamation were exhausted.

== History ==
St Patrick's College opened its doors for the first time on 31 August 1955. The school was constructed at a cost of approximately £250,000 and offered places to 450 young men, the school was built on the Antrim Road and has the address number "619".

The school inherited its subtitle, "Bearnageeha" from Bearnageeha House, the mansion around which the college is built. The name "Bearnageeha" is phonetically derived from the Gaelic phrase "bearna gaoithe", meaning "the windy gap". While little evidence survives as to why Bearnageeha House received its name, it has been suggested that it was related to its isolated location within the original Fortwilliam Estate; surrounded by the Belfast hills.

== Headmasters and headmistress ==
Patrick O’Neill	1955–1960
Billy Steele	1960–1980
George Salters	1980–1997
PJ O’Grady	1997–2011
Paula Stuart	2011–2017

== Sports ==
The school offered sports including football, hurling, soccer, handball, boxing, cross country and golf.

The sports department made use of local leisure centres, Mallusk Playing Fields, Cliftonville Playing Fields, Barnett's Park, Cavehill Country Park and the Antrim Forum Athletics Track, along with the school's own sports fields and synthetic grass sports facility. In 2016 the college opened a new gym facility, it included male and female changing rooms and a fitness suite.

In Gaelic Games, the college joined the ranks of the Ulster Colleges’ in the later part of the 1990s, competing in all age groups in Gaelic football and hurling. St. Patrick's has won a number of Ulster Colleges’ titles in both Gaelic football and hurling. The students that represented the College on the GAA front were drawn mainly from the three local clubs in north Belfast: Pearse's, Ardoyne Kickhams and St Enda's, Glengormley.

In football, all students who represented the school played in two competitions: the Belfast Schools Cup and Northern Ireland Schools Cup. Many past students played football at amateur, semi-pro and Irish League levels, while others played in England, including Tony Kane and Martin Donnelly.

In Cross Country, utilising the nearby Cavehill Country Park for preparation, St Patrick's students competed on an annual basis in the B District Championships; usually held at Ormeau Park or at Queen's University's complex at ‘The Dub’. Students regularly qualified for the Ulster Championships, the most recent achievement being a silver medal, which won by John McKeown in Tullamore, County Offaly.

For many years the College Golf Team participated in the Golfing Union of Ireland's inter-school competitions at Under 14 and Under 18 levels. The competitions are played over 18 holes under both stroke and match play conditions. The college participated in the GUI Winter League Ulster section.

== Houses ==
The college operates a house system, which was inaugurated in 1998 during the Headmastership of PJ O'Grady. It was at this time that the first three houses were created; Trinity (year 8), Saul (year 9) and Slemish (year 10). Each house has a designated colour and students wear their house badge on their school blazers. Each class in the Junior School has a rotating position of Prefect and Captain. Both Prefect and Captain wear a badge to show their position within their group

== Former students ==
- Martin Dillon (born 1949) - author, journalist, and broadcaster.
- Sam Millar (born 1955) - crime writer and playwright
- Ryan Burnett (born 1992) - boxer

== Former staff ==
- Tony McAuley (1939-2003) - broadcaster, producer and musician.
- Eamonn O'Kane (1945-2004) - trade unionist
- Hugh Niblock (1949-2022) - Gaelic footballer

== See also ==
- List of secondary schools in Belfast
