= Huyton Hill Preparatory School =

Coordinates: 53°24′43.98″N 2°49′59.89″W

Huyton Hill Preparatory School was a school for boys ages 8 to 13 focused on preparation for entering a Public School, open from 1926 to 1969.

The school is one of several that were evacuated from cities in England at the outbreak of World War II to escape the risk of German bombs. It was known for a progressive, liberal approach to discipline.

== The school at Huyton ==
Huyton Hill was established in September 1926 with four pupils at Victoria Road in Huyton near Liverpool, England. It is listed in the Liverpool Schools directory with its first headmaster, Hubert D. Butler.

The school motto was "I will with a good will", which set the tone for the ethos of the school and its administration.

Huyton Hill was the first school in the country to host its own aircraft landing strip as reported in Flight Magazine. Before becoming headmaster, Hubert Butler served in the Flying Corps in World War I as 2nd Lieutenant Flying Officer.

Butler became a member of the Incorporated Association of Preparatory Schools (IAPS) in November 1929, as listed in "Preparatory Schools Review", No. 104, Vol. X. Butler's name also appears in the "List of Members and Articles of Association", IAPS, January 1930, p. 5. In the IAPS List of Members and Articles of Association, May 1951, p. 7., the names of both Butler brothers are listed. Gerald V Butler became a member in 1950.

== The school in the Lake District ==
In September 1939 at the outbreak of World War II, the school moved to the Lake District where Pull Wood House, at the northwest corner of Windermere just south of Pull Wyke, was rented to accommodate the school. After the war headmaster Butler purchased the house and grounds. Butler's brother Gerard joined him as joint headmaster in 1950, after leaving the army, and the two brothers ran the school until 1969.

The number of pupils averaged 60 in the post-war period. The largest class, in 1965, was made up of 74 pupils, but the Pull Wood House couldn't accommodate a larger class so fewer attended in the next few years, with 61 attending in 1967. They were split into two houses, Alfred and Arthur.

Brigadier Gordon H. Osmaston joined the school as the mathematics teacher in 1948 after serving in the army in Iraq during World War II. Osmaston was most known for his three years (1936–1938) surveying and mapping the Himalayas with sherpa Tenzing Norgay.

== Progressive disciplinary policy ==
The school discipline policy was very progressive for its time, using a system of points that triggered rewards or loss of privileges instead of traditional methods. By the mid 1960s, corporal punishment had been abolished in the school.

The points system evolved over time. During the 1950s daily points were given or taken away depending upon behaviour. The boys could earn extra points during holidays by asking their parents to vouch that they had taken a cold bath every morning of the holidays (one point per day) or by pulling willow weeds along the school drive (one point for a hundred willows). A published Conduct List displayed the ranking of boys according to their point score (affectionately known as the 'Spite and Favour' list).

In the 1960s every pupil was awarded 10 points a day, making a perfect score for the week 70. Minor infringements could lead to the loss of one or two points, and up to 10 points could be lost for major misbehaviour. Scores were announced at the end of the week, with good conduct badges for those who lost no points and loss of privileges for those who lost too many points. Finishing the week with a negative score led to extra detention.

== Dormitories ==
The dormitories in the new school facility were named after local mountains in the Lake District as follows:

First floor (junior): Dollywaggon, Catbells, Langdale, Helvellyn, Latterbarrow*.

Second floor (senior): Skiddaw, Loughrigg, Bowfell, Kirkstone, Wetherlam, Scafell.

* not always used as a dormitory, depending on school population.

== School song ==
The school song was written by Hubert Butler with the help of pupils and set to the music Monk's Gate, which is best known as the hymn To be a Pilgrim by John Bunyan, 1684.

Often when tireless waves
Hurl them together
Into Tintagel's caves,
'Spite of the weather
Knights of the Table Round
On quests of Mercy bound
Sing to the thunder's sound
Laugh at the lightning.

Danes over wold and fen
Britain encumber;
Scarcely a thousand men
Alfred can number,
Yet shall the Wessex ground
To their proud tramp resound,
Drummed by the thunder's sound,
Lit by the lightning.

So here at Huyton Hill
We pledge the future;
We will with brave good will
Meet all adventure.
Where tasks do most confound,
There may we straight be found,
Though thunder echoes round
After the lightning.

== School closure ==
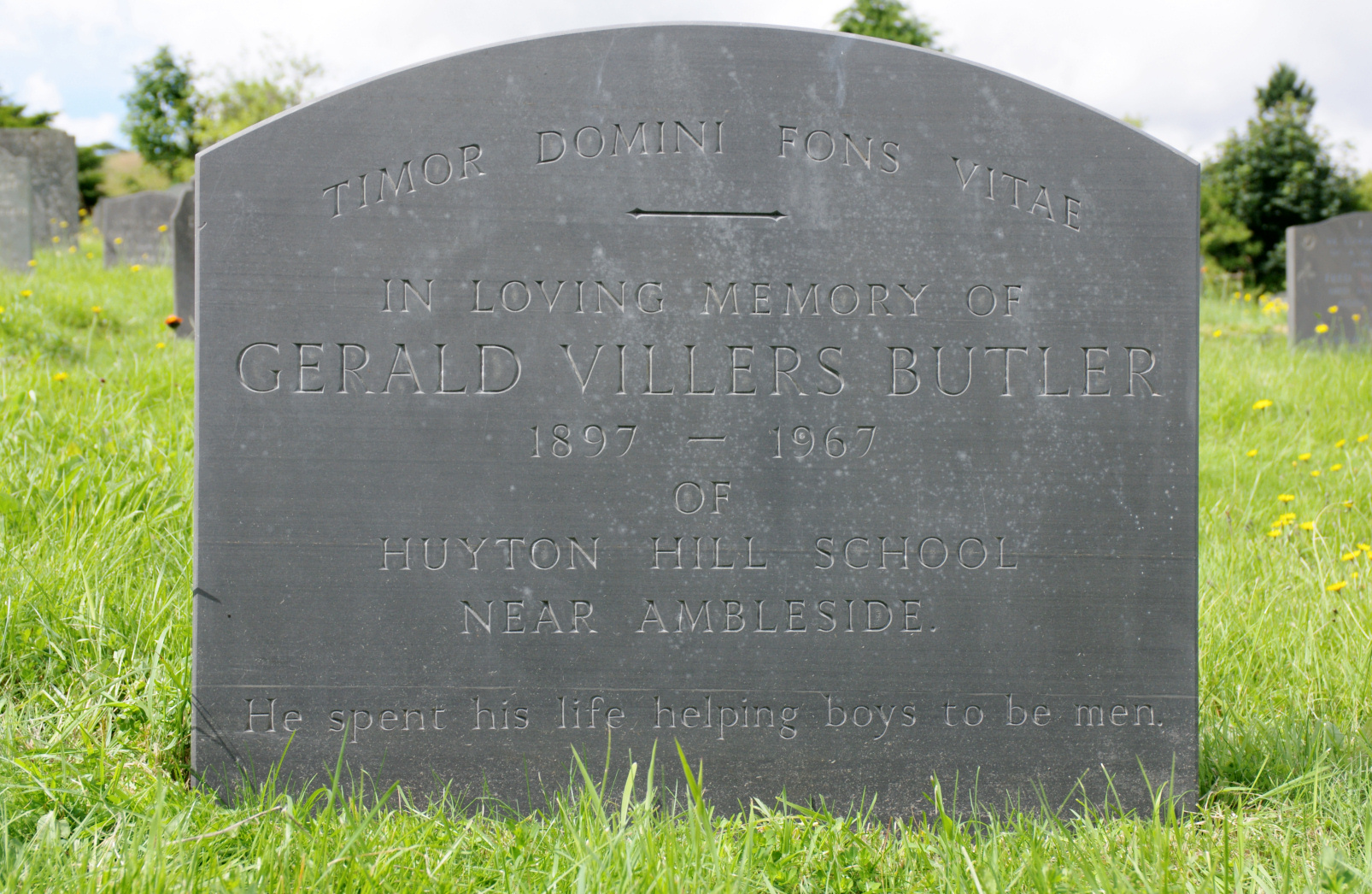
"He spent his life helping boys to be men."

Gerald Butler died in 1967 and the school was closed by his brother in 1969.

Hubert Butler then converted the house into holiday flats. He died in 1971 whilst working for UNICEF in Switzerland and the ownership of the building passed over to his son.
