= Palace of Monimail =

Bishop's palace in Fife, Scotland

Coordinates: 56.3140°N 3.1358°W

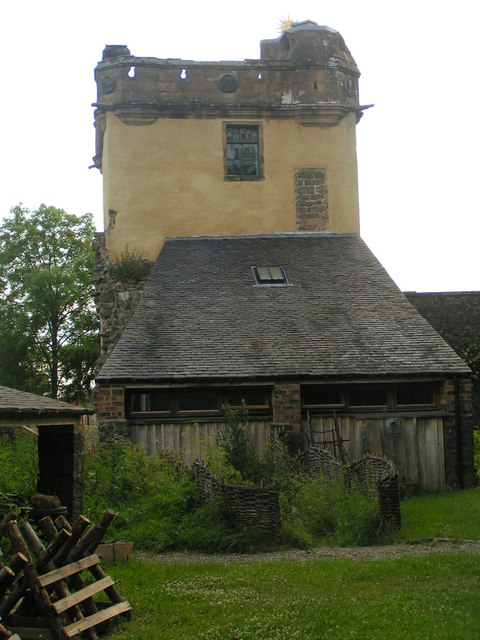
The restored tower of Monimail Palace

The Palace of Monimail, also known as Monimail Tower, was a Renaissance palace in Fife, Scotland. A residence of the Archbishops of St Andrews from the 13th century, in the early 17th century Monimail became a chief seat of the Melville family. Lord Monimail is one of the subsidiary titles of the Leslie-Melville Earls of Leven. It was abandoned in the late 17th century and subsequently most of the palace was demolished. One tower remains standing in the grounds of Melville House near the village of Monimail, 4 kilometres (2.5 mi) north of Ladybank.

== Origins ==
Monimail Palace was situated at the junction of the main roads between St. Andrews, Perth and Stirling, overlooking the Howe of Fife. This would have made Monimail an attractive property for the Bishops of St Andrews and from the time of its earliest documentation (1206), Monimail was an estate belonging to the bishop. Around 1319 William Lamberton (Bishop of St. Andrews 1298–1328) constructed a manor house of some quality at Monimail "in the period of stability that followed Bannockburn".

== The Renaissance Palace ==
According to legend the Palace was built by its most famous inhabitant: Cardinal David Beaton (c.1494–1546). However, recent research suggests that the building is in fact the work of his uncle, and predecessor as Archbishop of St Andrews, James Beaton (1473–1539). Monimail is described in this era as "a comfortable, if quiet, country residence, capable of accommodating the elite and their entourages." Church records show that it was the favourite residence of James and David Beaton after St Andrews itself. James Beaton went to the expense of importing fruit trees from France to plant in the gardens.

After David Beaton's murder in 1546 the palace continued to be used by his successors until the time of the Reformation. Archbishop John Hamilton (1512–1571), spent several weeks at Monimail in 1552 receiving medical treatments, for an unspecified condition, overseen by the Italian physician Jerome Cardan.

Mary, Queen of Scots visited the castle for dinner on 23 March 1563 but stayed at Baillinbreich. In 1564 Archbishop Hamilton sold Monimail to Sir James Balfour of Pittendriech. By this time the majority of the palace, with the exception of the tower, was said to be derelict. Balfour and his son undertook restoration of the tower, before selling on the estate in 1592 to Sir Robert Melville of Murdocairnie.

== The decline of Monimail Palace ==
In the late 1690s Sir Robert's descendant, George Melville, 1st Earl of Melville (1636–1707), who had recently been appointed President of the Privy Council, decided to build himself a mansion in the fashionable Classical style on his Monimail estate, to be called Melville House. For many years, the remains of Monimail Palace were maintained as a picturesque folly in the park of the new house. The tower of the palace was described as being in "pretty good preservation" as late as 1791. In the 1820s the Melvilles built walled gardens, changing the ground levels around the site of the palace and resulting in most of the remains being buried.

== Monimail Tower ==
The surviving tower comprises three storeys over a basement, which was later altered to form an ice house. The lower parts of the tower are likely to be part of the episcopal palace, though the upper parts date from later 16th-century restoration. An investigation in 1993 discovered the buried remnant of a corner tower to the north-west of Monimail Tower, and an adjoining section of curtain wall. The architectural detail, notably the Renaissance-style portrait roundels on the parapet, is comparable to that at the nearby Falkland Palace. The roundels at Monimail probably date from the 1570s, while those at Falkland were executed in the 1530s and the oaken Stirling Heads are from around 1540.

A restoration of the tower, to a high standard of authenticity using historically correct materials, was overseen by the Monimail Tower Preservation Trust in the 1990s-2000s. The gardens around the Tower are home to a small intentional community.

The tower is a category A listed building in recognition of its national importance.
