= Aberdare High School =

Coordinates: 51.72215°N 3.465457°W

Aberdare High School Ysgol Uwchradd Aberdâr
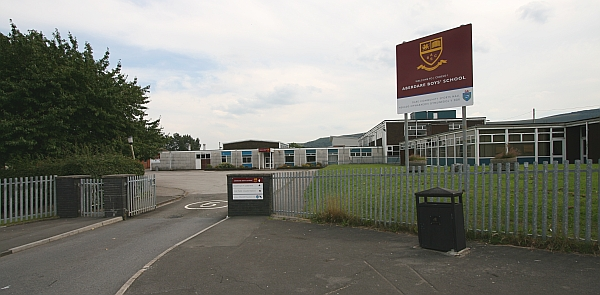

Location
- Aberdare High School, Cwmdare Road, Cwmdare, Aberdare, Rhondda Cynon Taf, CF44 8SS; Wales, Great Britain

Information
- Motto: "Building an excellent school together"
- Founded: 1896
- Closed: 2014 But used for one more year as Aberdare Community School Cwmdare Campus Years 10,11,12 and 13
- School number: 68505
- Age range: 11 to 18
- Enrollment: 600+
- Sixth form students: Cynon Valley Consortium
- Language: English
- Hours in school day: 7
- Slogan: Success. Yes we can.
- Sports: In order of popularity: Motor Rallying Co- Drivers and Drivers, Rugby, Football, Athletics, Gymnastics & Cricket

Aberdare High School (Welsh: Ysgol Uwchradd Aberdâr) was a comprehensive school in Aberdare, Wales.

The school was situated between the villages of Trecynon and Cwmdare and sited opposite the Coleg y Cymoedd site (formerly called Coleg Morgannwg).

Over 600 pupils attended the school, which had a separate sports facility, two annexes, an upper school and a lower school. The school was a member of the Cynon Valley 16+ Consortium, which combined the resources of several local schools for sixth form tuition.

The school's 'Dare Valley Sports Hall' was used by the public (after school hours) and the pupils of the school.

Prior to September 2009, the school's name was Aberdare Boys' Comprehensive School.

== Aberdare Boys' Grammar School ==
Aberdare Boys' Grammar School was located in Aberdare, Wales. Situated in Trecynon, it was called the Aberdare Intermediate School when it opened in 1896. It was also a mixed school at that time. There were 80 such schools in Wales in 1896, rising to 101 by 1920. The change of name to "Grammar School" followed the Education Act 1944. In 1964, the school relocated to Cwmdare Road. It ceased to be a grammar school in 1978, when the buildings were used to house the new Aberdare Boys' Comprehensive School.

== Aberdare Community School ==
It was announced in 2012 that Aberdare High School, Aberdare Girls' School and Blaengwawr Comprehensive School would merge to form a new 'super-school' which became Aberdare Community School. The construction of the new £50m campus began on the Michael Sobell Sports Centre site in 2013 with the intentions of creating a unified education, leisure and community hub. After several delays, the intended September 2014 opening date of the new 1,600 pupil building was pushed back to April 2015 with the formation of Aberdare Community School still set for September 2014. Blaengwawr Comprehensive, Aberdare High and Aberdare Girls' schools were closed at the end of the Summer Term 2014. It was announced that due to delays of the new campus, the four buildings previously occupied by the three schools would temporarily house various school years until a gradual move is possible once the new building was completed in 2015.

== Notable former pupils ==
- Lyn Evans, physicist, project leader of the Large Hadron Collider at CERN, Switzerland
- Martyn Gough, Anglican priest and Royal Navy chaplain
- Gwyn Morgan OBE, NUS President, Labour Party official, EU civil servant and diplomat
- Darren Morris, Wales rugby union team
- Simon Thomas, former Plaid Cymru Member of Parliament
- Dai Young, (former Wales rugby player and Cardiff Blues coach)
- Trefor Jones, educator and headmaster
