= Blaengwawr Comprehensive School =

Blaengwawr Comprehensive School Welsh: Ysgol Gyfun Blaengwawr

Location
- Club Street; Aberaman, Mid Glamorgan, CF44 6TN; Wales; 51°42′20″N 3°26′22″W

Information
- Type: Comprehensive
- Motto: Addysg Porth Bywyd (Education is the gateway to life)
- Established: 1974
- Closed: 16 July 2018
- Local authority: Rhondda Cynon Taf
- Ofsted: Reports
- Gender: Boys & Girls
- Age: 11 to 18
- Enrolment: 800

Blaengwawr Comprehensive School (Welsh: Ysgol Gyfun Blaengwawr) was a comprehensive school in the village of Aberaman, near Aberdare, Rhondda Cynon Taf. It was one of three local schools closed in 2014 and merged to form Aberdare Community School.

The school's catchment area included the communities of Aberaman, Cwmaman, Godreaman and Abercwmboi. It was a mixed school with over 800 girls and boys. Included in this number were approximately 160 pupils attending from outside the catchment area. The main feeder primary schools included Blaengwawr, Oaklands, Glynhafod and Capcoch.

The school also housed the Special Support Centre for pupils throughout the Cynon Valley who have physical or hearing difficulties.

== Cynon Valley Consortium ==
The school was a founding member of the Cynon Valley Consortium which allowed Sixth Form students to commute to nearby schools (Aberdare High, St Johns, Aberdare Girls' and Mountain Ash Comprehensive) to continue their studies and share resources. Transport between schools was provided and run by Blaengwawr. Each year the Consortium held a Parents' evening for all of the teachers, parents and students involved.

== Facilities ==
The school's site is home to an Astroturf pitch which was used by the school's and local football, hockey and other sports teams. It is a full sized, floodlit pitch with football and hockey nets.

Due to the school's excellence as a Special Support Centre, the school also had disabled access to every part of the school; including two elevators (one external) and a purpose-built graded ramp for access to the higher level of the school.

== Closure ==
In 2010 the parents, staff and governors of Blaengwawr were presented with a document planning the closure and subsequent amalgamation of three schools in Aberdare; Aberdare High School, Aberdare Girls School and Blaengwawr Comprehensive School. This proposal was strongly opposed by all concerned with Blaengwawr as it was believed that it did not serve in the best interests of the pupils or the community of Aberdare. However it was confirmed on 18 May 2012, that the Welsh Government had approved the plans to close the school and create a new super school on the Ynys site.

=== Aberdare Community School ===
It was announced in 2012 that Aberdare High School, Aberdare Girls' School and Blaengwawr Comprehensive School would merge to form a new 'super-school'. The construction of the new £50 million campus began on the Michael Sobell Sports Centre site in 2013 with the intentions of creating a unified education, leisure and community hub. After several delays, the intended September 2014 opening date of the new 1,600 pupil building was pushed back to April 2015 with the formation of Aberdare Community School still set for September 2014. Blaengwawr Comprehensive, Aberdare High and Aberdare Girls' schools were closed at the end of the Summer Term 2014. It was announced that due to delays of the new campus, the four buildings previously occupied by the three schools would temporarily house various school years until a gradual move is possible once the new building is completed in 2015.

The Blaengwawr Comprehensive campus was put up for sale by the local council in November 2015. As of October 2016 there has yet to be a buyer.

The former building has since been demolished, with the site being blocked off to traffic. The site is now mostly a wasteground, but does still feature a small concrete football pitch that remains accessible to the public.

== Notable Former Pupils ==
- Stuart Cable, drummer for Stereophonics
- Ian Evans, Wales rugby international
- Kelly Jones, singer-songwriter
- Richard Jones, bassist for Stereophonics
