= Droylsden Academy =

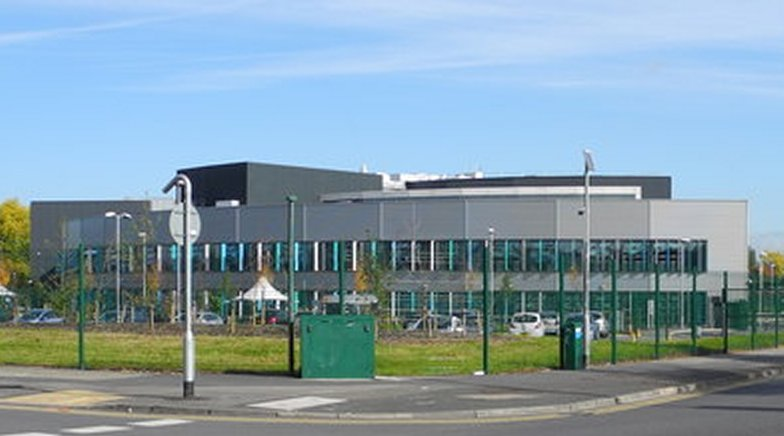

Location
- Manor Road; Droylsden, Greater Manchester, M43 6QD; England; 53.482636°N 2.159146°W

Information
- Type: Academy
- Department for Education URN: 135864 Tables
- Ofsted: Reports
- Gender: Coeducational
- Age: 11 to 16
- Colour: Blue
- Website: http://www.droylsdenacademy.com/

Droylsden Academy is a secondary school in Droylsden, Manchester. It opened in September 2009 on the site of the former Droylsden School, Mathematics and Computing College for Girls which it replaced. The former Littlemoss High School for Boys was also replaced by this school.

The school buildings were completed in January 2012 and accommodates 1400 students. The School also housed a small number of sixth form students between the years of 2011 and 2013 under the name D6. This branch of the school was closed down in 2013 causing A-level students to relocate to other sixth form colleges, mainly to Clarendon Sixth Form College, formerly in Hyde.

This school uses a slogan of PH2 (politeness hard-working and honesty.)

== History ==
Former schools on this site, always known locally as Manor Road School, have included:

- Droylsden High School for Girls, a secondary modern school, 1951–2009
- Droylsden School, Mathematics and Computing College for Girls, c.2000 – 2009
