= Aberdare Community School =

Aberdare Community School Ysgol Gymunedol Aberdâr

Location
- Ynys Road; Aberdare, Rhondda Cynon Taf, CF44 7RP; Wales; 51°42′54″N 3°27′29″W

Information
- Type: Comprehensive School
- Motto: Strive, Believe, Achieve; Ymdrechu, Credu, Cyflawni
- Established: 2014
- Department for Education URN: 402344 Tables
- Headteacher: Richard Owens
- Gender: Mixed
- Age: 11 to 18
- Enrolment: 1,600
- Colours: Black, gold and maroon
- Website: www.aberdareschool.com

Aberdare Community School (Welsh: Ysgol Gymunedol Aberdâr) is a secondary school located in Aberdare, Wales. The school was formed in September 2014 as part of a merger between Aberdare High School, Aberdare Girls' School and Blaengwawr Comprehensive School.

== Formation of Aberdare Community School ==
It was announced in 2012 that Aberdare High School, Aberdare Girls' School and Blaengwawr Comprehensive School would merge to form a new 'super-school'. The construction of the new £50m campus began on the Michael Sobell Sports Centre site in 2013 with the intentions of creating a unified education, leisure and community hub. After several delays, the intended September 2014 opening date of the new 1,600 pupil building was pushed back to April 2015 with the formation of Aberdare Community School still set for September 2014. Blaengwawr Comprehensive, Aberdare High and Aberdare Girls' schools were closed at the end of the Summer Term 2014. In July 2021, a school mascot was introduced by headteacher Carol Morgans, called "Llygoden Fawr" (Studious Mouse) and is meant to depict the hard working nature of students and staff alike and give the school a figure to represent themselves by.
