= Wellington School, Midlothian =

Defunct school in Scotland

Coordinates: 55.7974°N 3.2165°W

Wellington School

Information
- Former name: The Wellington Reformatory Farm School
- School type: Reform school
- Motto: Resurgam
- Established: 1859
- Closed: 2014
- Gender: Boys

Wellington School, Midlothian, Scotland was a residential school for boys, owned by the City of Edinburgh Council and operated by the Council's Children and Families Department. It was operational between 1859 and 2014.

Established in 1859 and initially known as "The Wellington Reformatory Farm School", the school was the creation of "The Edinburgh Association for the Reformation of Juvenile Offenders"; one of the founding members of the association was the Rev. Dr. Thomas Guthrie. The Wellington Reformatory Farm School sprang from thinking similar to that which created the reform school developments in the United States.

The school admitted its first pupil in February 1860: James Watt, aged eleven years. James had been convicted at The Police Court of Edinburgh and sentenced by Sheriff Hallard to fourteen days' imprisonment and thereafter five years' detention at the Reformatory School. James's crime had been the "theft of a bottle of hair oil from off a barrow on the street". James had had no previous convictions.

Although the word "Farm" was dropped from the school's name many years ago, it was still often referred to in Edinburgh as "Wellie Farm".

In 2013 the decision was made by Edinburgh council to close the school because of falling numbers. After 153 years the school closed in June 2014.

The school's War Memorial listing those of its pupils who died in the Great War is to be lodged in Penicuik South Parish Church.

The school archive has been preserved for posterity including admission papers which stretch back to the first pupils, correspondence from former pupils and the medical register. Many of the records have gone to the City of Edinburgh Archive, whilst some are held by the Penicuik Historical Society. In August 2014 confidential files were found unsecured in the building.

The school motto was "Resurgam" and the crest was a phoenix above a saltire.
