= Frederick Bremer School =

Location
- Siddeley Road; Walthamstow, London, E17 4EY; England
- Coordinates: 51.5941°N 0.0031°W

Information
- Former names: Warwick School for Boys and Aveling Park
- Type: Community Comprehensive
- Motto: Be the best you can be
- Established: 2008
- Local authority: Waltham Forest
- Department for Education URN: 103094 Tables
- Ofsted: Reports
- Chair: Malcolm Howard
- Headteacher: Jenny Smith
- Staff: 100
- Gender: Coeducational
- Age: 11 to 16
- Enrolment: 900
- Colours: Navy and White
- Website: www.bremer.org.uk

Frederick Bremer School is a coeducational secondary school in Walthamstow, East London. It has been rated good in its most recent Ofsted inspections.

== History ==
The school opened in September 2008, replacing Warwick School for Boys and Aveling Park School. The school, which is named after local inventor Frederick William Bremer, officially opened on 29 April 2009. Its creation was part of Waltham Forest borough's £200 million 'Building Schools for the Future' programme. The building cost £20,000,000.

== Student life ==
Frederick Bremer School currently has a six form intake for children aged 11–16 (years 7–11). The Headteacher is Jenny Smith. There are roughly 900 students. Both football and cricket leagues have been won by Bremer, and the cricket team placed 4th in London.

Frederick Bremer School runs a finger-print based scanning system that is also used in other Waltham Forest schools and council services. The card is used to pay for lunch and school trips with top-up machines near to the entrance of the school.

== Facilities ==
The school's facilities are available for the local and wider community to hire. Facilities include Sports, Arts, Drama and Educational spaces open during the evenings, weekends and school holidays. It consistently holds a good Ofsted review and is making very good progress in all areas with a view to becoming an outstanding school.

== Academics ==
The school's results for GCSEs in 2016 were slightly below the National average, and were also below the Local average. 56% of students achieved a C or above in either Maths or English. This is below the country average of 59.3% and the Local average of 63.6%. The school saw a 13% increase in the proportion of grades from 9-5 under the reformed GCSE system from 2018 to 2019.

== In popular culture ==
The school was in Channel 4's educating series which started on 4 September 2014, under the name of Educating the East End.
