= Aveling Park School =

Coordinates: 51.5965°N 0.0190°W

- Aveling Park Road, Walthamstow; United Kingdom

Information
- Type: Mixed secondary school
- Established: 1970s

Aveling Park School was a mixed secondary school situated on Aveling Park Road, Walthamstow which educated up to 600 pupils. In the early 1970s it was called William Fitt Junior High School and was a feeder school to McEntee, Walthamstow Girls, and Sir George Monoux Senior High Schools. William Fitt Secondary Modern School moved from its temporary site (shared with Winns Avenus Junior School) in Elphinstone Road, to the new purpose built school building in Lloyds Park in September 1962. The Headteacher at the time was Mr G R Easton. The school's motto was "Semper Aptus" ('Always Fit' or 'Always Prepared')

Notable ex-pupils include Cartrain, choreographer Matthew Bourne and footballers Teddy Sheringham, Colin Kazim-Richards and Chris Day.

Aveling Park was created from the merging of William Fitt and Chapel End Junior High (Senior) School at the start of the 1986 school year. Although the two schools merged, the sites were retained and known as their respective previous names until the demolition of the old Victorian Chapel End school building some years later.

In September 2008, Aveling Park School merged with the Warwick School for Boys to form a new school on the site of the former Hawker Siddeley factory in Fulborne Road. The new school is known as the Frederick Bremer School.
