= Warwick School for Boys =

Coordinates: 51.5848°N 0.0024°W

Warwick School for Boys was an all-boys school in the London Borough of Waltham Forest. Warwick was one of only two boys' schools in the Borough. The school had two sites (north and south). The north site was a combination of two Victorian buildings and two newer buildings; the south site was one newer building. There were 2 playgrounds.

== Frederick Bremer ==
Warwick School for Boys and Aveling Park School merged in September 2008 as Frederick Bremer School, an 11-16 mixed comprehensive school.
