= Alexander Leslie-Melville =

Alexander Leslie-Melville may refer to:

- Alexander Leslie-Melville, 7th Earl of Leven (1749–1820), Scottish Whig politician
- Alexander Leslie-Melville, 10th Earl of Leven (1817–1889)
- Alexander Leslie-Melville, 14th Earl of Leven (1924–2012), Scottish peer and soldier
- Alexander Leslie-Melville, Lord Balgonie (1831–1857), British soldier

== See also ==
- Alexander Leslie (disambiguation)
- Alexander Melville (disambiguation)
