= Archibald Leslie-Melville, 13th Earl of Leven =

British soldier and peer

The Right Honourable The Earl of Leven KT DL

Lord Lieutenant of Nairn
- In office 1935–1947
- Preceded by: Ian Brodie
- Succeeded by: John Grahame Buchanan Allardyce

Personal details
- Born: Archibald Alexander Leslie-Melville; 6 August 1890
- Died: 15 January 1947 (aged 56)
- Spouse: Lady Rosamond Foljambe (m. 1918; died 1947)
- Relations: John Leslie-Melville, 12th Earl of Leven (brother)
- Children: 5
- Parent(s): Ronald Leslie-Melville, 11th Earl of Leven; Emma Selina Portman
- Education: Royal Military College, Sandhurst

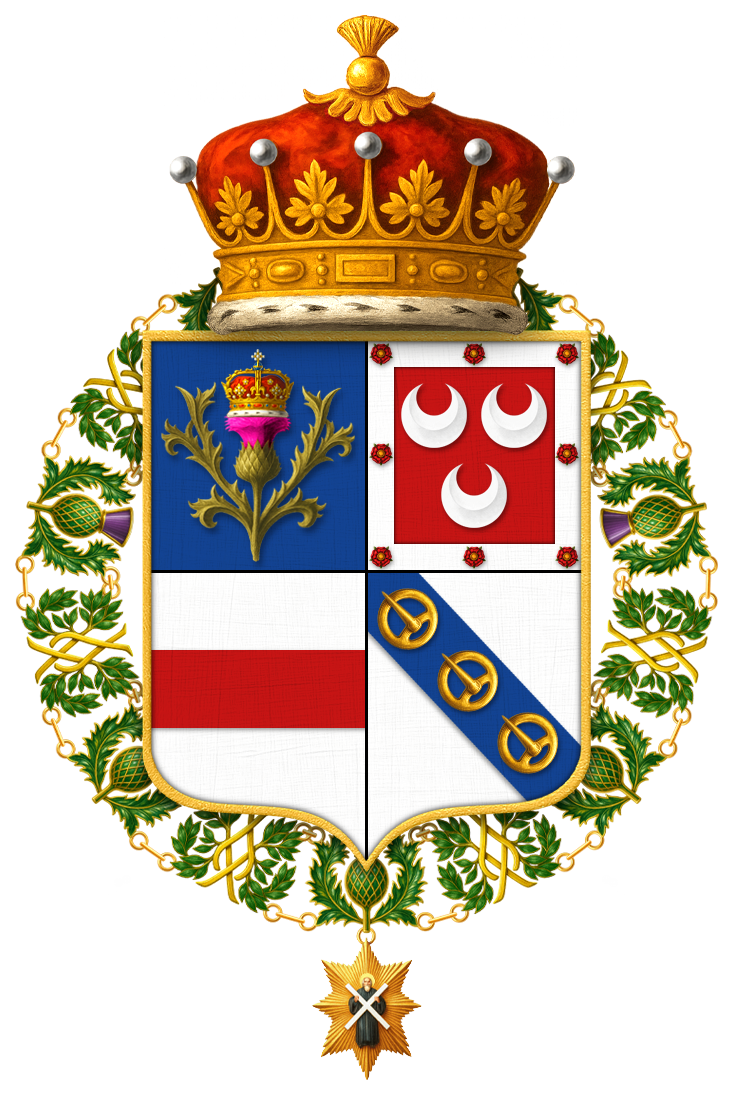
Shield of Arms of Archibald Alexander Leslie-Melville, 13th Earl of Leven, 12th Earl of Melville, KT, DL

Archibald Alexander Leslie-Melville, 13th Earl of Leven, 12th Earl of Melville KT DL (6 August 1890 – 15 January 1947) was a Scottish soldier, and peer.

== Early life ==
Leslie-Melville was born on 6 August 1890. He was the second son of Ronald Leslie-Melville, 11th Earl of Leven and the former Emma Selina Portman (1863–1941). His siblings were John Leslie-Melville, 12th Earl of Leven, Capt. Hon. David William Leslie-Melville, Lt.-Col. Hon. Ian Leslie-Melville, and Lady Constance Betty Leslie-Melville. His father was a very wealthy landowner and resided at Holyrood Palace when he was Lord High Commissioner of Scotland.

He was educated at Oxford and Royal Military College, Sandhurst. He played for the Oxford University Polo on a Handicap of +3.

== Career ==
He served in World War I, where he was injured. He was Captain in the Royal Scots Fusiliers. He was Lieutenant-Colonel, and Brevet Colonel in the Lovat Scouts.

He was a Scottish representative peer, between 1927 and 1947. He was made Knight of the Thistle in 1934; and was Lord Lieutenant of Nairnshire from 1935 to 1947. He donated his collection of nineteenth century drawings and water-colours, which include scenes from Great Britain and Italy, to the Bodleian Library in 1920.

== Personal life ==
On 3 September 1918, Lord Leven married, his half-cousin once removed, Lady Rosamond Sylvia Diana Mary Foljambe, a younger daughter of Cecil Foljambe, 1st Earl of Liverpool, and, his second wife, Susan Louisa Cavendish (eldest daughter of Lt.-Col. William Henry Frederick Cavendish, a grandson of the 1st Earl of Burlington). Together, they had five children:

- Lady Jean Elizabeth Leslie Melville (1921–2010)
- Alexander Robert Leslie-Melville, 14th Earl of Leven (1924–2012), who married Susan Steuart-Menzies, a daughter of Lt.-Col. Ronald Steuart-Menzies of Culdares, of Arndilly House, in 1953.
- Hon. George David Leslie Melville (1924–1997), who married Diana Mary Houldsworth, a daughter of Sir Henry Walter Houldsworth and Katharine Charlotte Douglas, in 1955.
- Hon. Ronald Joscelyn Leslie Melville (1926–1987), who married Ruth Buckworth, only daughter of Dr. John Duckworth, in 1962.
- Hon. Alan Duncan Leslie Melville (1928–2019), who married Sally Haywood, in 1997.

Lord Leven died on 15 January 1947 and was succeeded by his 22 year old son, Alexander. His widow died 12 April 1974.

Honorary titles
| Preceded by Ian Brodie | Lord Lieutenant of Nairn; 1935–1947 | Succeeded by John Grahame Buchanan Allardyce |
Peerage of Scotland
| Preceded by John David Melville | Earl of Leven; Earl of Melville; 1913–1947 | Succeeded by Alexander Robert Leslie-Melville |
