= John Leslie-Melville, 12th Earl of Leven =

Scottish soldier, peer and banker

Lieutenant The Right Honourable The Earl of Leven

Scottish representative peer
- In office 15 December 1910 – 11 June 1913

Personal details
- Born: John David Leslie-Melville; 5 April 1886
- Died: 11 June 1913 (aged 27) London, England
- Relations: Archibald Leslie-Melville, 13th Earl of Leven (brother); Henry Portman, 2nd Viscount Portman (grandfather)
- Parent(s): Ronald Leslie-Melville, 11th Earl of Leven; Hon. Emma Selina Portman
- Education: Balliol College, Oxford

Military service
- Branch/service: Lovat Scouts
- Rank: Lieutenant

John David Leslie-Melville, 12th Earl of Leven (5 April 1886 – 11 June 1913) (known as Lord Balgonie from 1889 to 1906) was a Scottish soldier and banker who served as a Scottish representative peer.

== Early life ==
Leslie-Melville was born on 5 April 1886. He was the eldest son of Ronald Leslie-Melville, 11th Earl of Leven and the former Emma Selina Portman (1863–1941). His siblings were Hon. Archibald Alexander Leslie-Melville, Capt. Hon. David William Leslie-Melville, Lt.-Col. Hon. Ian Leslie-Melville, and Lady Constance Betty Leslie-Melville. His father was a very wealthy landowner and resided at Holyrood Palace when he was Lord High Commissioner of Scotland.

His paternal grandparents were John Thornton Leslie-Melville, 9th Earl of Leven and the former Sophia Thornton (a daughter of abolitionist Henry Thornton MP). His maternal grandfather was Henry Portman, 2nd Viscount Portman.

He was educated at Balliol College, Oxford, where he used to hunt with the Bicester Hounds.

== Career ==
Lord Leven was a Lieutenant in the Lovat Scouts Yeomanry in the British Army. He served as a Scottish representative peer from 1910 until his death in June 1913. He was also a member of the London banking firm of Frederick Huth & Co.

Upon his father's death on 21 August 1906, he succeeded as the Viscount of Kirkaldie, the Lord Raith, Monymaill and Balwearie, the Earl of Melville, the Earl of Leven, the Lord Melville of Monymaill, the Lord Balgonie. Lord Leven was required to pay death duties of $1,250,000 on the estate, which exceeded $6,500,000. Reportedly, the "depletion of the estate so impressed the successor to it that he insured his life for the benefit of the estate."

== Personal life ==
Lord Leven died, unmarried, on 11 June 1913, "caused by injuries sustained in the hunting field", which was later determined to be "an accidental death". His funeral was held in Scotland, and his titles passed to his younger brother, Archibald. The death duties of over $600,000 were met by the insurance taken out upon his succession to the title. A year later, his brother, a Lieutenant in the Second Dragoons, Royal Scots Greys, was wounded during the "cavalry fight in Waterloo". Lord Leven was left behind when his regiment retreated and later escaped from a German prison disguised as a refugee.

Peerage of Scotland
Preceded by Ronald Leslie-Melville	Earl of Leven; Earl of Melville; 1906–1913	Succeeded by Archibald Leslie-Melville
