= Ronald Leslie-Melville, 11th Earl of Leven =

Scottish nobleman (1835–1906)

The Right Honourable The Earl of Leven KT, PC, DL
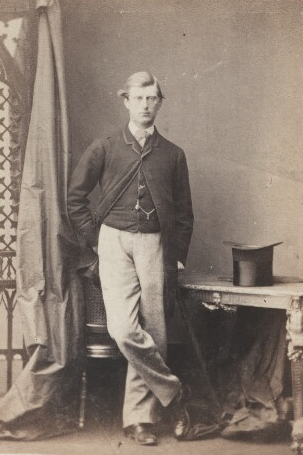
- Photograph of Ronald Leslie-Melville from 1861
- Born: 1835
- Died: 1906 (aged 70–71)
- Occupation: company director
- Title: Earl of Leven

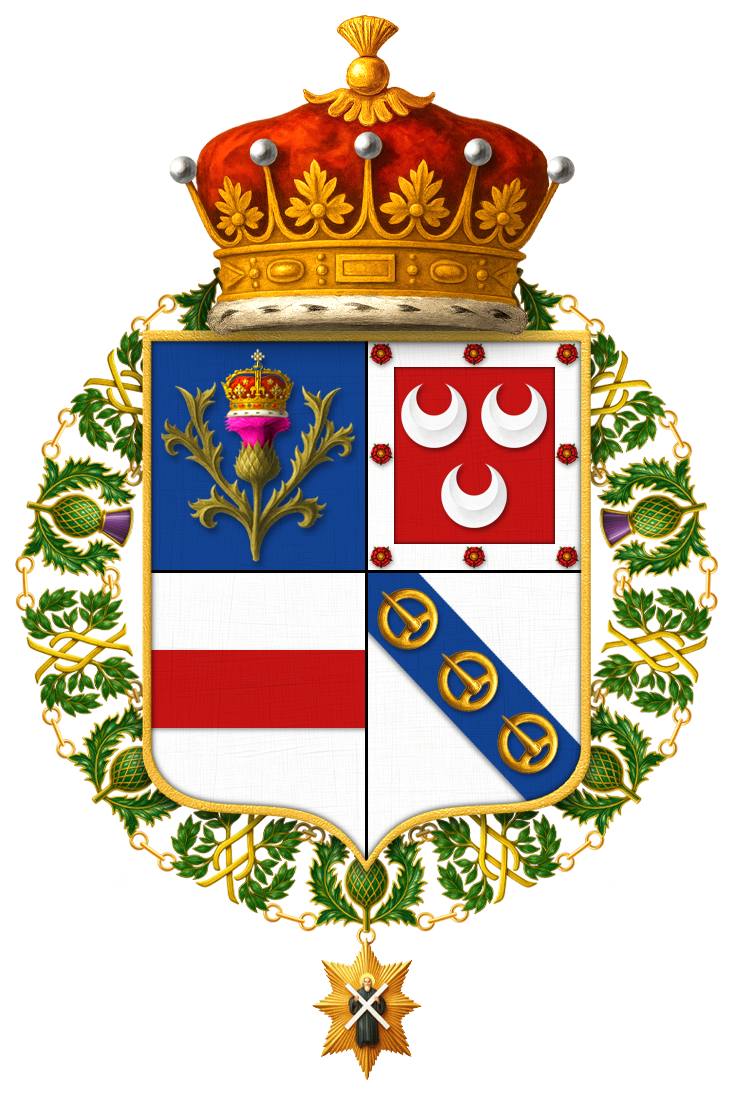
Shield of Arms of Ronald Ruthven Leslie-Melville, 11th Earl of Leven and 10th Earl of Melville, KT, PC, DL

Ronald Ruthven Leslie-Melville, 11th Earl of Leven and 10th Earl of Melville, KT, PC, DL (19 December 1835 – 21 August 1906) was a Scottish nobleman.

== Early life ==
The son of the John Thornton Leslie-Melville, 9th Earl of Leven and his second wife, Sophia, daughter of Henry Thornton MP, he was educated at Windlesham House School and Eton College. He matriculated in 1854 at Christ Church, Oxford, where he graduated B.A. in 1858 and M.A. in 1865.

He succeeded his half-brother Alexander Leslie-Melville, 10th Earl of Leven in 1889.

== Career ==
He was a director of P&O and of the Bank of England.

He was a Scottish representative peer from 1892 until his death, Keeper of the Privy Seal of Scotland from 1900 until his death, and Lord High Commissioner to the General Assembly of the Church of Scotland for nine successive years 1898–1906. Director of the Bank of England 1884–94. He was deputy lieutenant for the City of London. He was appointed a Privy Counsellor in the 1902 Coronation Honours list, and was sworn a member of the council at Buckingham Palace on 11 August 1902. He was appointed a Knight of the Thistle in 1905.

He was a close friend of the Maharajah Duleep Singh and accompanied him on a voyage from England to Italy which began in December 1856.

== Personal life ==
In 1885 he married Honourable Emma Selina Portman, eldest daughter of Henry Portman, 2nd Viscount Portman; they had children:

- John David Leslie-Melville, 12th Earl of Leven,
- Archibald Alexander Leslie-Melville, 13th Earl of Leven,
- Captain Honourable David William Leslie-Melville MBE (23 May 1892 – 10 December 1938),
- Lieutenant-Colonel Honourable Ian Leslie-Melville (14 August 1894 – 10 February 1967),
- Lady Constance Betty Leslie-Melville (7 August 1888 – 13 August 1922).

Political offices
Preceded by The Marquess of Lothian	Keeper of the Privy Seal of Scotland; 1900–1907	Succeeded by The Marquess of Breadalbane
Peerage of Scotland
Preceded by Alexander Leslie-Melville	Earl of Leven; Earl of Melville; 1889–1906	Succeeded by John David Melville
