= David Leslie-Melville, 8th Earl of Leven =

Scottish peer and admiral (1785–1860)

Vice-Admiral The Right Honourable The Earl of Leven
- Born: 22 June 1785
- Died: 1860 (aged 74–75)
- Military career
- Allegiance: United Kingdom
- Branch: Royal Navy
- Service years: c. 1800–1846
- Rank: Vice admiral
- Commands: HMS Delight; HMS Romulus
- Conflicts: Napoleonic Wars

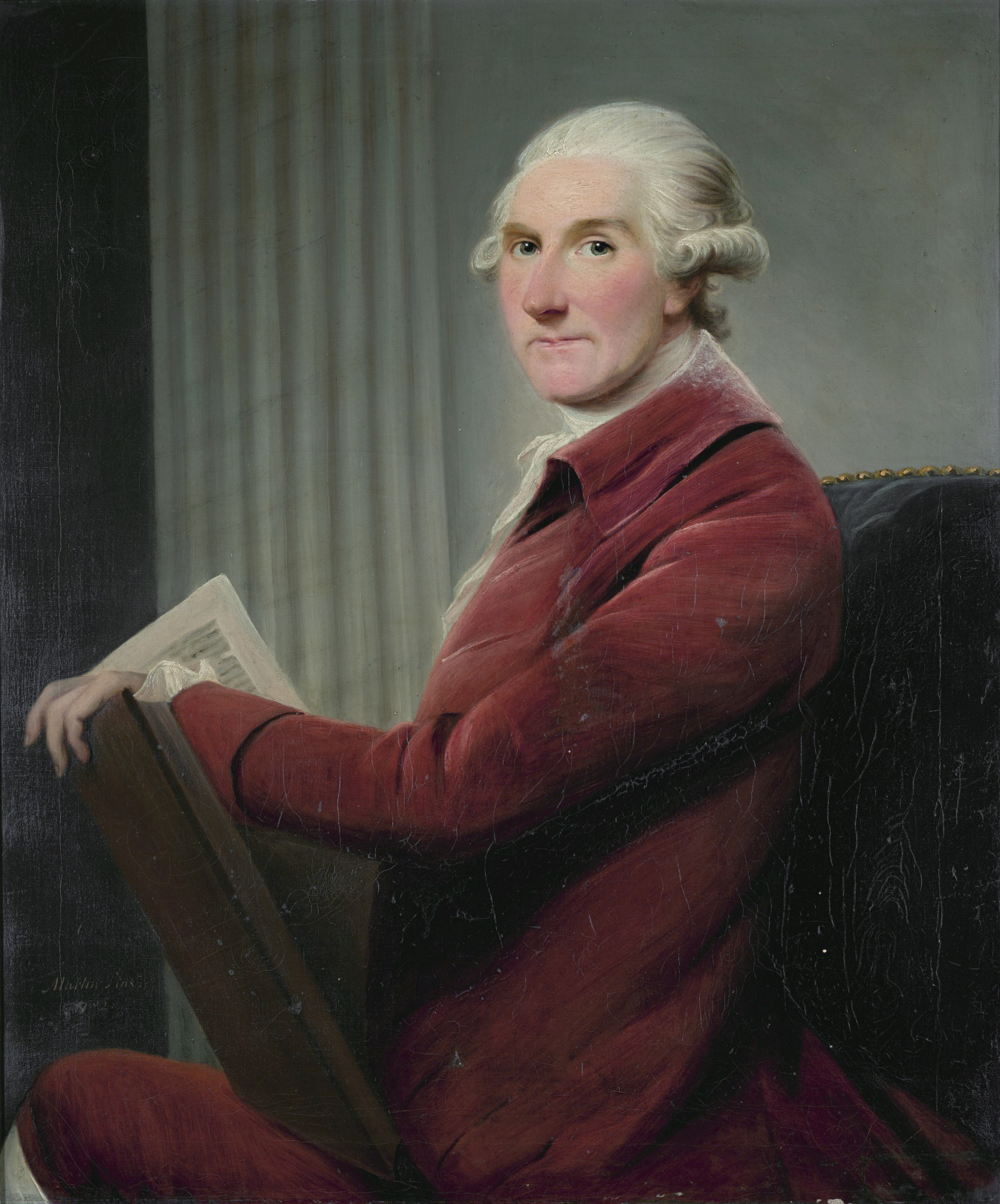
David Leslie, painted by David Martin

David Leslie-Melville, 8th Earl of Leven, 7th Earl of Melville (1785–1860) was a Scottish peer and admiral.

He entered the Royal Navy c. 1800; he became Rear Admiral in 1846, and Vice Admiral in 1858. He was a Representative Peer (Tory), for Scotland from 1831 to 1860.

== Family ==
He was the son of Alexander Leslie-Melville, 7th Earl of Leven, 6th Earl of Melville (1749–1820). He married on 21 June 1824, Elizabeth Anne Campbell (died 8 November 1863), 2nd daughter of Sir Archibald Campbell of Succoth, 2nd Baronet, by his wife Elizabeth Balfour, 1st daughter of John Balfour of Balbirnie; they had children:

- Capt Alexander Leslie-Melville, Lord Balgonie (19 November 1831 – 29 August 1857),
- David Archibald Leslie-Melville (14 October 1833 – 20 October 1854),
- Lady Elizabeth Leslie-Melville (died 25 January 1892), who married on 2 November 1858, Thomas Robert Brook Cartwright (died 23 January 1921), son of Sir Thomas Cartwright GCH, and had issue,
- Lady Anna Maria Leslie-Melville (died 8 December 1874), who married on 26 April 1865, as his first wife Sir William Stirling-Maxwell, 9th Baronet KT MP, and had issue,
- Lady Susan Lucy Leslie-Melville, Lady of the Bedchamber to the Princess Christian from 1868 to 1883 (died 8 June 1910)
- Lady Emily Eleanor Leslie-Melville (22 May 1840 – 11 November 1882), who married on 28 March 1864, John Glencairn Carter Hamilton, 1st Baron Hamilton of Dalzell, and had issue.

He was succeeded by his brother John Thornton Leslie-Melville, 9th Earl of Leven, 8th Earl of Melville (1786–1876).

== See also ==
- O'Byrne, William Richard (1849). "Leslie-Melville, David" . A Naval Biographical Dictionary . John Murray – via Wikisource.

Peerage of Scotland
Preceded by Alexander Leslie-Melville	Earl of Leven; Earl of Melville; 1820–1860	Succeeded by John Leslie-Melville
