= Leslie Alexander =

Leslie Alexander may refer to:

- Leslie Alexander (businessman) (born 1943), American attorney, businessman and financier; owner of the Houston Rockets
- Leslie Alexander (rabbi), American rabbi
- Leslie M. Alexander (born 1948), American diplomat
- Leslie M. Alexander (American scholar), American professor and author

== See also ==
- Alexander Leslie (disambiguation)
