= John Leslie-Melville, 9th Earl of Leven =

Scottish peer and soldier (1786–1876)

The Right Honourable The Earl of Leven and Melville DL JP

Scottish representative peer
- In office 28 July 1865 – 16 September 1876
- Preceded by: The Lord Rollo
- Succeeded by: The Earl of Lauderdale

Personal details
- Born: John Thornton Leslie-Melville; 18 December 1786
- Died: 16 September 1876 (aged 89)
- Party: Conservative
- Spouses: Harriet Thornton (m. 1812; died 1832) Sophia Thornton (m. 1834)
- Relations: David Leslie-Melville, 8th Earl of Leven (brother); John Thornton (grandfather); Samuel Thornton (uncle); Henry Thornton (uncle)
- Parent(s): Alexander Leslie-Melville, 7th Earl of Leven; Jane Thornton

John Thornton Leslie-Melville, 9th Earl of Leven, 8th Earl of Melville DL JP (18 December 1786 – 16 September 1876) was a Scottish peer and soldier.

== Early life ==
John Thornton was born on 18 December 1786. He was the son of Alexander Leslie-Melville, 7th Earl of Leven and the former Jane Thornton (1757–1818). His siblings included the Hon. William Leslie-Melville, the Hon. and Rev. Robert Leslie-Melville, the Hon. Alexander Leslie-Melville of Branston Hall, Lady Lucy Leslie-Melville (wife of Henry Smith), Lady Jane Leslie-Melville (wife of Francis Pym), and Lady Marianne Leslie-Melville (wife of Abel Smith).

His paternal grandfather was David Melville, 6th Earl of Leven (who also sat in the House of Lords as a Scottish representative peer), and his maternal grandfather was merchant and philanthropist John Thornton.

== Career ==
As his brother, David Leslie-Melville, 8th Earl of Leven, died without surviving male issue, he succeeded as the 11th Earl of Leven in 1860. The Earldom of Melville has been held by the Earls of Leven since 20 May 1707.

He was Deputy Paymaster to the Forces in the Peninsula in 1809; he was a founding partner in the banking partnership Williams, Deacon, Labouchere, Thornton & Co; he was a Representative Peer for Scotland (Conservative) from 1865 to 1876.

== Personal life ==
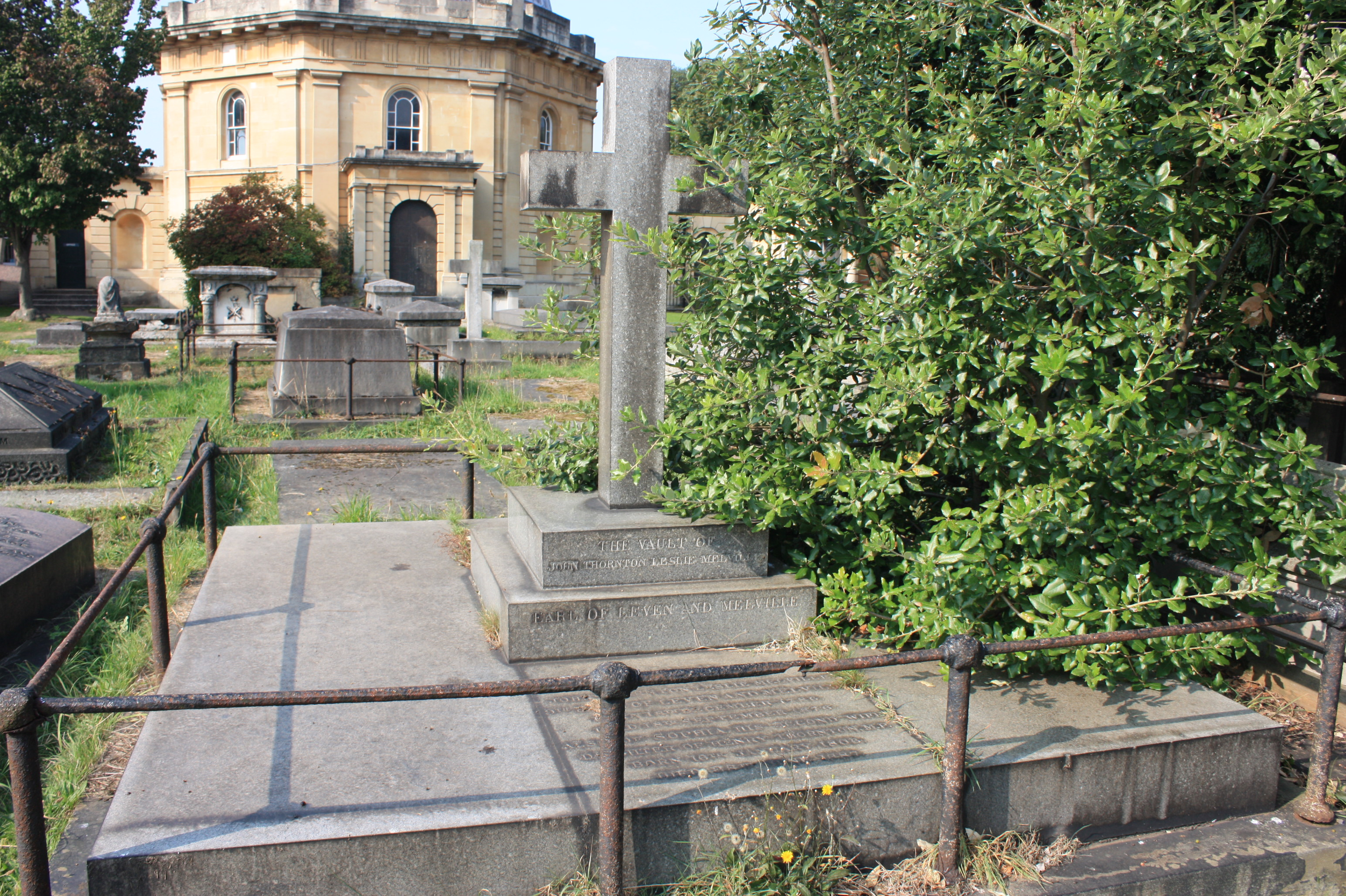
The grave of John Thornton Leslie-Melville, Brompton Cemetery

On 15 September 1812, he married his cousin, Harriet Thornton, daughter of Samuel Thornton, MP and Elizabeth (née Milnes) Thornton (a daughter of Robert Milnes). Together, they were the parents of:

- Lady Emily Maria Leslie-Melville (1815–1896), who married Robert Williams, MP for Dorchester.
- Alexander Leslie-Melville, 10th Earl of Leven (1817–1889)
- Hon. Alfred John Leslie-Melville (1826–1851), who died at age 24 at Penang, Malaysia.
- Lady Julia Louisa Leslie-Melville (1829–1870), who married, as his second wife, Lt Gen Robert Richardson-Robertson, younger brother of Sir John Stewart-Richardson, 13th Baronet.
- Lady Adelaide Harriet Leslie-Melville (1831–1898)

After the death of his first wife, he married another cousin, Sophia Thornton (1806–1887) on 23 April 1834. Sophia, who was also a cousin of his first wife Harriet, was the fourth daughter of reformer Henry Thornton (brother of Samuel Thornton, above). Together, they were the parents of the following children:

- Ronald Leslie-Melville, 11th Earl of Leven (1835–1906), who married Hon. Emma Selina Portman, eldest daughter of Henry Portman, 2nd Viscount Portman, in 1885 and had issue.
- Hon. Norman Leslie-Melville (1839–1923), who married Georgina Ball, a daughter of Capt William Shirley Ball of Abbeylara, in 1861.
- Lady Ann Sophia Leslie-Melville (1843–1898)
- Lady Florence Lucy Leslie-Melville (1848–1930)
- Lady Kathleen Mabel Leslie-Melville (d. 1958), who married Charles Henry Farrer, a grandson of Thomas Fremantle, 1st Baron Cottesloe, in 1894.

Lord Leven died on 16 September 1876 and was succeeded in the earldoms by his eldest surviving son, Alexander. He is buried with his second wife Sophia on the south side of the southern roundel in Brompton Cemetery in London.

Peerage of Scotland
Preceded by David Leslie-Melville	Earl of Leven; Earl of Melville; 1860–1876	Succeeded by Alexander Leslie-Melville
