= Alexander Leslie (disambiguation) =

Alexander Leslie, 1st Earl of Leven (1582–1661) was a Scottish soldier in Dutch, Swedish and Scottish service.

Alexander Leslie may also refer to:

- Alexander Leslie, Earl of Ross (died 1402), Scottish nobleman
- Alexander Leslie (British Army officer) (1731–1794), officer active during the American Revolutionary War
- Alexander Leslie, Lord Balgonie (died c. 1642) - see Earl of Leven
- Alexander Leslie, 2nd Earl of Leven (c. 1637–1664) - Earl of Leven
- Alexander Leslie, 5th Earl of Leven (1695–1754)
- Alexander Leslie of Auchintoul (1590–1663), Russian general of Scottish origin
- Alexander Leslie (engineer) (1844–1893), Scottish civil engineer

== See also ==
- Alexander Leslie-Melville (disambiguation)
- Leslie Alexander (disambiguation)
