= John Leslie-Melville =

John Leslie-Melville may refer to:

- John Leslie-Melville, 12th Earl of Leven (1886–1913), Scottish soldier and banker
- John Leslie-Melville, 9th Earl of Leven (1786–1876), Scottish peer and soldier
