= Alexander Leslie-Melville, Lord Balgonie =

British soldier

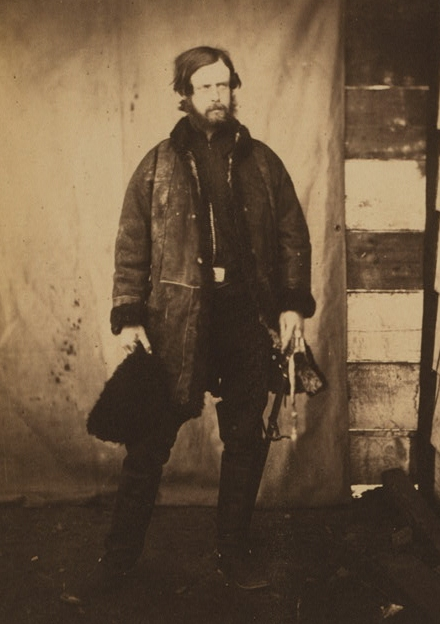
Lord Balgonie in the Crimea, circa 1855

Alexander Leslie-Melville, Viscount Balgonie (19 November 1831 Monimail, Fife, Scotland – 29 August 1857 Wandsworth, London, England) was a British soldier.

He held the title of Lord Balgonie as a courtesy title; he was the eldest son of David-Leslie Melville, 8th Earl of Leven, 7th Earl of Melville and Elizabeth Ann Campbell. He served in the Grenadier Guards.

He visited Egypt in 1856 with his two sisters to improve his poor health after falling ill during service in the Crimean War. But he returned to Britain weaker, and died in 1857, from tuberculosis.
