= Alexander Leslie-Melville, 14th Earl of Leven =

Scottish peer and soldier

- Born: 13 May 1924
- Died: 7 April 2012 (aged 87)

Alexander Robert Leslie-Melville, 14th Earl of Leven, 13th Earl of Melville DL (13 May 1924 – 7 April 2012) was a Scottish peer and soldier.

He was educated at Eton College. A captain in the Coldstream Guards, he fought in the Second World War, and was wounded.

He was Aide-de-camp to the Governor-General of New Zealand, from 1951 to 1952. He was Deputy Lieutenant of Nairn, from 1961 to 1969. He was Lord Lieutenant of Nairn, from 1969 to 1999. He was Chairman of the Nairn County Council, from 1970 to 1974. He was president of the British Ski and Snowboard Federation (BSSF).

== Family ==
He married Susan Steuart-Menzies, on 30 April 1953, daughter of Lt Col Ronald Steuart-Menzies of Culdares; they had children:

- David Alexander Leslie Melville, Lord Balgonie (26 January 1954 – 14 February 2007), he married Julia Critchley in 1981. They have two children:
  - Alexander Ian Leslie Melville, 15th Earl of Leven, 14th Earl of Melville (29 November 1984)
  - Hon. Louisa Clare Leslie Melville (18 September 1987)
- Lady Jane Catherine Leslie Melville (5 May 1956) she married Philip Mark Gurney Hudson in 1977. They have two daughters:
  - Katherine Laura Hudson (24 December 1983)
  - Susanna Jane Hudson (26 February 1986)
- Hon. Archibald Ronald Leslie Melville (15 September 1957). he married Julia Fox on 4 April 1987. They have three daughters:
  - Alice Catherine Leslie Melville (12 November 1990)
  - Camilla Jane Leslie Melville (29 August 1992)
  - Joanna Julia Leslie Melville (6 July 1994)

Honorary titles
Preceded by James Erskine Stirling	Lord Lieutenant of Nairn; 1969–1999	Succeeded by Ewen Brodie
Peerage of Scotland
Preceded by Archibald Leslie-Melville	Earl of Leven; Earl of Melville; 1947–2012	Succeeded by Alexander Ian Leslie-Melville
