= Alexander Leslie-Melville, 10th Earl of Leven =

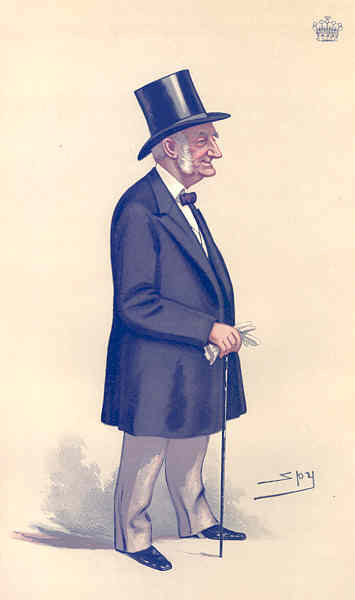
"amiability" The Earl of Leven and Melville as caricatured by Spy (Leslie Ward) in Vanity Fair, December 1881

Alexander Leslie-Melville, 10th Earl of Leven, 9th Earl of Melville (1817–1889)

He was the son of John Leslie-Melville, 9th Earl of Leven. He was a partner in Williams. Deacon & Co, and was a Representative Peer for Scotland (Conservative) from 1880 to 1889.

He was succeeded by his half-brother Ronald Ruthven Leslie-Melville, 11th Earl of Leven, 10th Earl of Melville (1835–1906).

Peerage of Scotland
Preceded by John Leslie-Melville	Earl of Leven; Earl of Melville; 1876–1889	Succeeded by Ronald Leslie-Melville
