= Alexander Leslie-Melville, 7th Earl of Leven =

Scottish Whig politician and peer (1749–1820)

The Right Honourable The Earl of Leven and Melville
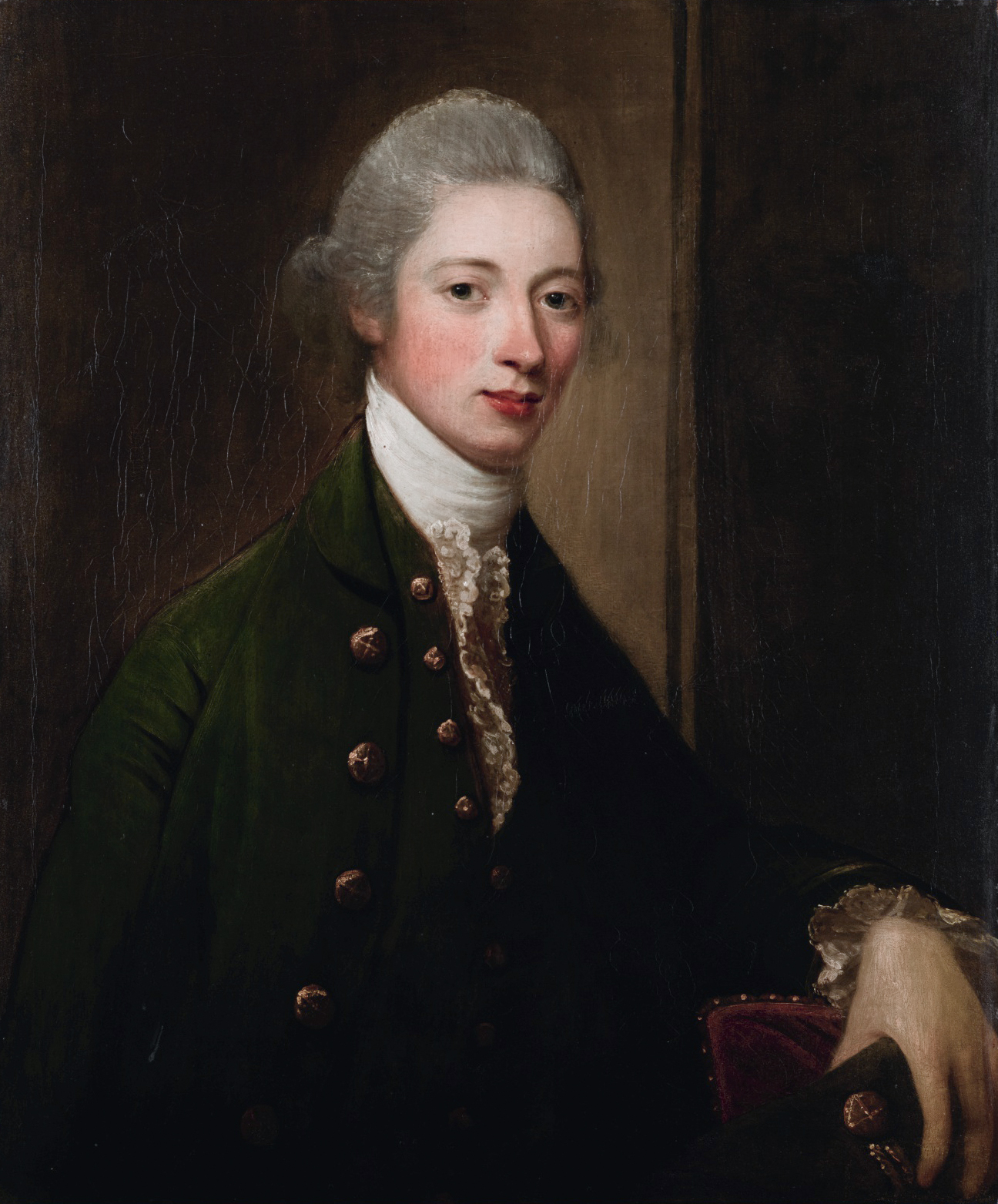
- Alexander, Earl of Leven (1749-1820) (David Martin)

Scottish representative peer
- In office 4 December 1806 – 29 April 1807
- Monarch: George III
- Preceded by: The Earl of Leven
- Succeeded by: The Earl of Leven

Personal details
- Born: Alexander Leslie-Melville; 7 November 1749
- Died: 22 February 1820 (aged 70)
- Party: Whig
- Spouse: Jane Thornton (m. 1784; died 1818)
- Children: 8; including David and John
- Parent(s): David Melville, 6th Earl of Leven; Wilhelmina Nisbet

Alexander Leslie-Melville, 7th Earl of Leven, 6th Earl of Melville (7 November 1749 – 22 February 1820) was a Scottish Whig politician and peer.

As the eldest son of David Melville, 6th Earl of Leven, he succeeded his father as Earl of Leven and Earl of Melville on 9 June 1802. Between 1806 and 1807 he sat in the House of Lords as a Scottish representative peer.

== Family ==
On 12 August 1784 he married Jane Thornton (11 February 1757 – 13 February 1818), daughter of John Thornton, and they had five sons and three daughters:

- David Leslie-Melville, 8th Earl of Leven (22 June 1785 – 8 October 1860), married Elizabeth Anne Campbell, daughter of Sir Archibald Campbell, 2nd Baronet, of Succoth, and had issue
- John Thornton Leslie-Melville, 9th Earl of Leven (18 December 1786 – 16 September 1876), married firstly his first cousin Harriet Thornton, daughter of Samuel Thornton, and had issue, and secondly his first cousin Sophia Thornton, daughter of Henry Thornton, and had further issue
- The Hon. William Henry Leslie-Melville (1788 – 1856)
- The Hon. and Rev. Robert Samuel Leslie-Melville (d. 24 October 1826)
- The Hon. Alexander Leslie-Melville (18 June 1800 – 19 November 1881) of Branston Hall, married Charlotte Smith, daughter of Samuel Smith, and had issue
- Lady Lucy Leslie-Melville (d. 23 December 1865), married Henry Smith, son of Samuel Smith, and had issue
- Lady Jane Elizabeth Leslie-Melville (d. 25 April 1848), married Francis Pym, son of Francis Pym, and had issue
- Lady Marianne Leslie-Melville (d. 22 March 1823), married Abel Smith, son of Samuel Smith, no issue.

Peerage of Scotland
Preceded by David Leslie-Melville	Earl of Leven; Earl of Melville; 1802–1820	Succeeded by David Leslie-Melville
