= Gavin Campbell, 1st Marquess of Breadalbane =

Scottish nobleman and Liberal politician

The Most Honourable The Marquess of Breadalbane KG PC JP DL
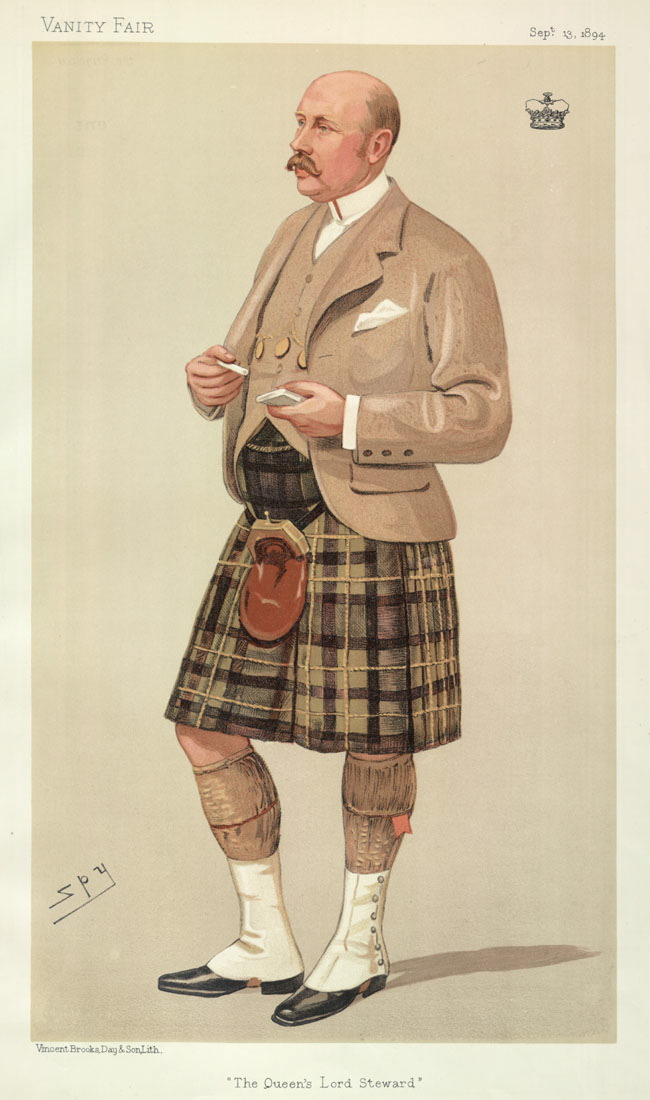
- "The Queen's Lord Steward". Caricature by Spy published in Vanity Fair in 1894.

Lord Steward of the Household
- In office 25 August 1892 – 21 June 1895
- Monarch: Victoria
- Prime Minister: William Ewart Gladstone; The Earl of Rosebery
- Preceded by: The Earl of Mount Edgcumbe
- Succeeded by: The Earl of Pembroke

Personal details
- Born: 9 April 1851 Fermoy, County Cork, Ireland
- Died: 19 October 1922 (aged 71) Glasgow, Scotland
- Party: Liberal
- Spouse: Lady Alma Graham (1854–1932)
- Education: University of St Andrews

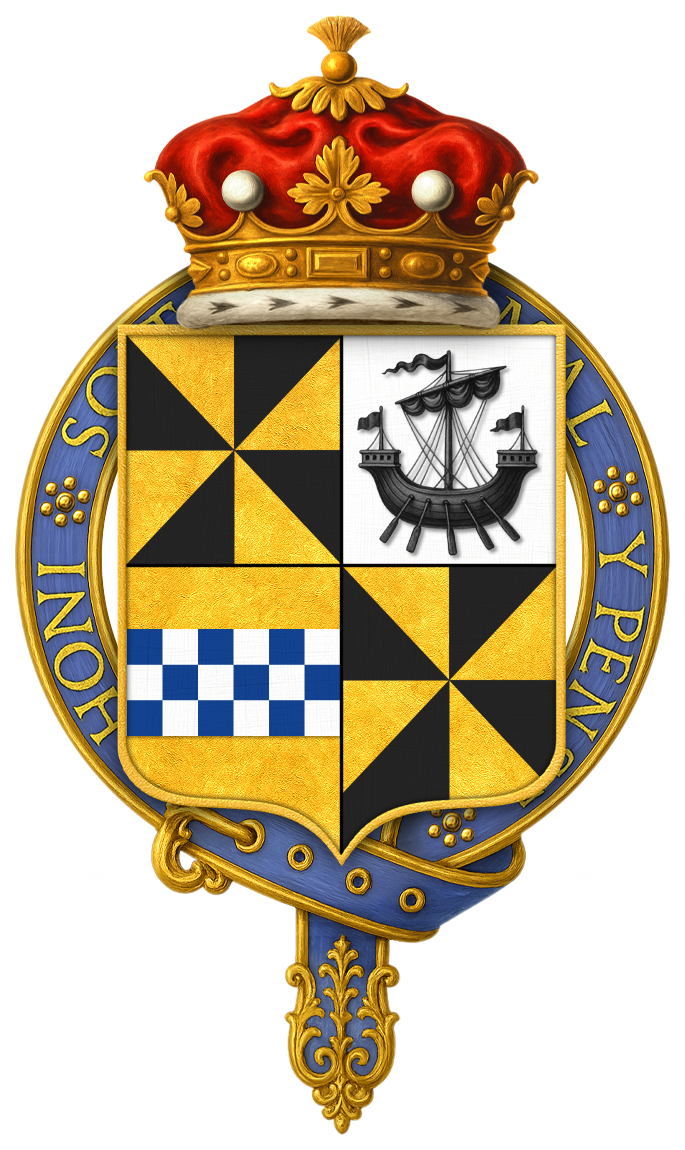
Quartered arms of Gavin Campbell, 1st Marquess of Breadalbane, KG, PC, JP, DL

Gavin Campbell, 1st Marquess of Breadalbane (9 April 1851 – 19 October 1922), styled as Lord Glenorchy between 1862 and 1871 and as the Earl of Breadalbane and Holland between 1871 and 1885, was a Scottish nobleman and Liberal politician.

== Background and education ==
Campbell was born at Fermoy, County Cork, the eldest son of John Campbell, 6th Earl of Breadalbane and Holland, by Mary Theresa, daughter of John Edwards, of Dublin. He was educated at St Andrews. After his father succeeded in the earldom of Breadalbane and Holland in 1862, Campbell became known by the courtesy title Lord Glenorchy until he succeeded his father in the earldom in 1871.

== Military and political career ==
Breadalbane served as a lieutenant in the 4th Battalion, Argyll and Sutherland Highlanders from 1873 to 1874. He was later in the Shropshire Yeomanry, entering as Sub-Lieutenant in 1877, being promoted to lieutenant in 1882, retiring as captain in 1887. From 1897 to 1910 he was Lieutenant-Colonel commanding the Highland Cyclist Battalion, of which he became Honorary Colonel in 1913, and was appointed an Aide-de-Camp for volunteers to King Edward VII with the substantive rank of colonel in January 1903.

As his earldom was a Scottish peerage it did not entitle him to an automatic seat in the House of Lords. However, in 1873 he was created Baron Breadalbane, of Kenmure in the County of Perth, in the Peerage of the United Kingdom, which gave him a seat in the House of Lords. That same year he was appointed a Lord-in-waiting in the Liberal administration of William Ewart Gladstone. The Liberals fell from power in 1874 but returned to office in 1880, when Breadalbane was sworn of the Privy Council and appointed Treasurer of the Household by Gladstone, a post he held until 1885. The latter year he was created Earl of Ormelie, in the County of Caithness, and Marquess of Breadalbane, in the Peerage of the United Kingdom.

Lord Breadalbane did not serve in Gladstone's brief 1886 administration, but once again held office as Lord Steward of the Household from 1892 to 1895, firstly under Gladstone and from 1894 under the premiership of Lord Rosebery. In 1894 he was appointed a Knight of the Garter. He also served as Lord High Commissioner to the General Assembly of the Church of Scotland in 1893, 1894 and 1895 and as Lord Lieutenant of Argyllshire from 1914 until 1922 and was the last holder of the office of Keeper of the Privy Seal of Scotland, which he held from 1907 until his death in 1922 in Glasgow.

He was a Knight of the Order of the Seraphim of Sweden and a Knight of Justice of the Order of St John of Jerusalem (KStJ), in which capacity he represented King Edward VII during the dedication in June 1902 of the restored chapel at Marienburg Castle, originally the seat of the Teutonic Order. He was awarded the silver medal of the Royal Humane Society, and was also a Brigadier-General of the Royal Company of Archers.

== Personal life ==
Lord Breadalbane married Lady Alma Imogen Carlotta Leonore Graham, the youngest daughter of James Graham, 4th Duke of Montrose, in 1872. They had no children.

He owned 438,000 acres in Perth and Argyll. He was chairman of the Loch Tay Steamboat Company and the Killin Railway.

A member of the Bath and County Club, in 1910 he presented the Club with a case of stuffed capercailzie.

He died at the Central Station Hotel in Glasgow in October 1922, aged 71, and was buried at Finlarig.

The barony of Breadalbane, earldom of Ormelie and marquessate of Breadalbane became extinct on his death, while he was succeeded in his Scottish titles by his nephew Iain. Lady Breadalbane died in May 1932, aged 77.

Political offices
Preceded by The Marquess of Huntly	Lord-in-waiting; 1873–1874	Succeeded by The Earl of Dunmore
Preceded by Lord Henry Thynne	Treasurer of the Household; 1880–1885	Succeeded by Viscount Folkestone
Preceded by The Earl of Mount Edgcumbe	Lord Steward of the Household; 1892–1895	Succeeded by The Earl of Pembroke
Preceded by The Earl of Leven	Keeper of the Privy Seal of Scotland; 1907–1922	Vacant
Honorary titles
Preceded by The Duke of Argyll	Lord Lieutenant of Argyllshire; 1914–1922	Succeeded by The Duke of Argyll
Peerage of the United Kingdom
New creation	Marquess of Breadalbane; 1885–1922	Extinct
New creation	Baron Breadalbane; 1873–1922	Extinct
Peerage of Scotland
Preceded by John Campbell	Earl of Breadalbane and Holland; 1871–1922	Succeeded by Iain Campbell
