= Alexander Leslie, 5th Earl of Leven =

Scottish aristocrat (1695–1754)

The Right Honourable The Earl of Leven

Lord High Commissioner to the General Assembly of the Church of Scotland
- In office 1741–1753
- Preceded by: The Earl of Hyndford
- Succeeded by: The Earl of Hopetoun

Personal details
- Born: Alexander Leslie; 28 May 1695
- Died: 2 September 1754 (aged 59)
- Spouses: Mary Erskine (m. 1721; died 1723) Elizabeth Monypenny (after 1726)
- Parent: David Leslie, 3rd Earl of Leven

Alexander Leslie, 5th Earl of Leven (28 May 1695 – 2 September 1754) was a Scottish aristocrat.

== Early life ==
He was the son of David Leslie, 3rd Earl of Leven (1660–1728) and Lady Anne Wemyss (1675–1702).

His mother was the eldest daughter of James Wemyss, Lord Burntisland and Lady Margaret Wemyss, suo jure Countess of Wemyss (the only daughter of David Wemyss, 2nd Earl of Wemyss).

== Career ==
Following the death of his nephew in 1729 (his elder brother predeceased their father in 1721), he inherited the earldoms of Leven and Melville, though he did not use the latter title.

Lord Leven served as a Lord of Session from 1734 to 1754; Grand Master of Scottish Freemasons 1741 to 1742; Lord High Commissioner to the General Assembly of the Church of Scotland from 1741 to 1753; a Representative Peer for Scotland from 1747 to 1754; and a Lord of Police 1754.

== Personal life ==
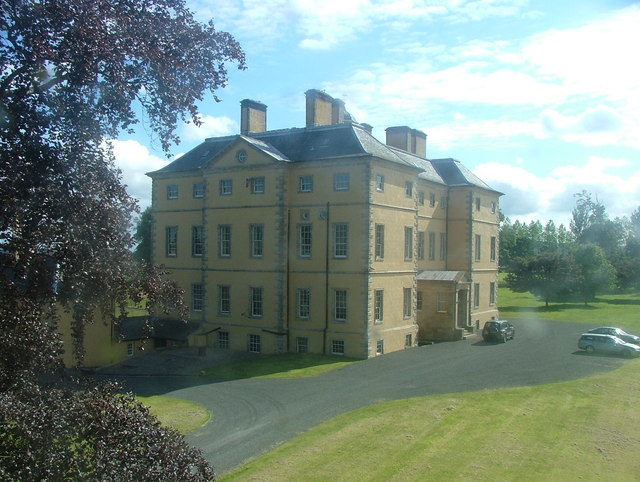
Melville House

On 23 February 1721, he married Mary Erskine, a daughter of Col. Hon. John Erskine of Carnock (third son of David Erskine, 2nd Lord Cardross) and Anna Dundas (daughter and co-heiress of William Dundas of Kincavel). Before her death in 1723, they had one child:

- David Leslie, 6th Earl of Leven (1722–1802), who married Wilhelmina Nisbet, daughter of William Nisbet.

After the death of his first wife in 1723, he married Elizabeth Monypenny, a daughter of Alexander Moneypenny of Pitmilly, on 13 March 1726. They had four children:

- Alexander Leslie (1731–1794), a Major-general in the British Army who married Mary Tullidelph, a daughter of Dr. Walter Tullidelph of Tullidelph, in 1760.
- Lady Anne Leslie (1730–1779), who married George Carnegie, 6th Earl of Northesk.
- Lady Mary Leslie (1736–1821), a novelist who married Dr. James Walker in 1762. After his death, she married George Robinson Hamilton.
- Lady Elizabeth Leslie (1737–1788), who married John Hope, 2nd Earl of Hopetoun

Lord Leven and Melville died on 2 September 1754 and was succeeded in his titles by his eldest son, David.

Peerage of Scotland
Preceded by David Leslie	Earl of Leven; Earl of Melville; 1729–1754	Succeeded by David Leslie
Masonic offices
Preceded by The Earl of Strathmore and Kinghorne	Grand Master of the Grand Lodge of Scotland; 1741–1742	Succeeded by The Earl of Kilmarnock
Political offices
Preceded by The Earl of Hyndford	Lord High Commissioner; 1741–1753	Succeeded by The Earl of Hopetoun
