= Alexander Melville =

Alexander Melville may refer to:

- Alexander Melville, 5th Earl of Leven (1695–1754), Scottish peer
- Alexander Melville (anatomist) (1819–1901), Irish anatomist
- Alexander Melville, Lord Raith (1655–1698), Scottish treasurer-depute
- Alexander Melville (artist) (1823–1892), British portrait painter

== See also ==
- Alexander Leslie-Melville (disambiguation), later Earls of Leven
