= David Leslie, 6th Earl of Leven =

British noble (1722–1802)

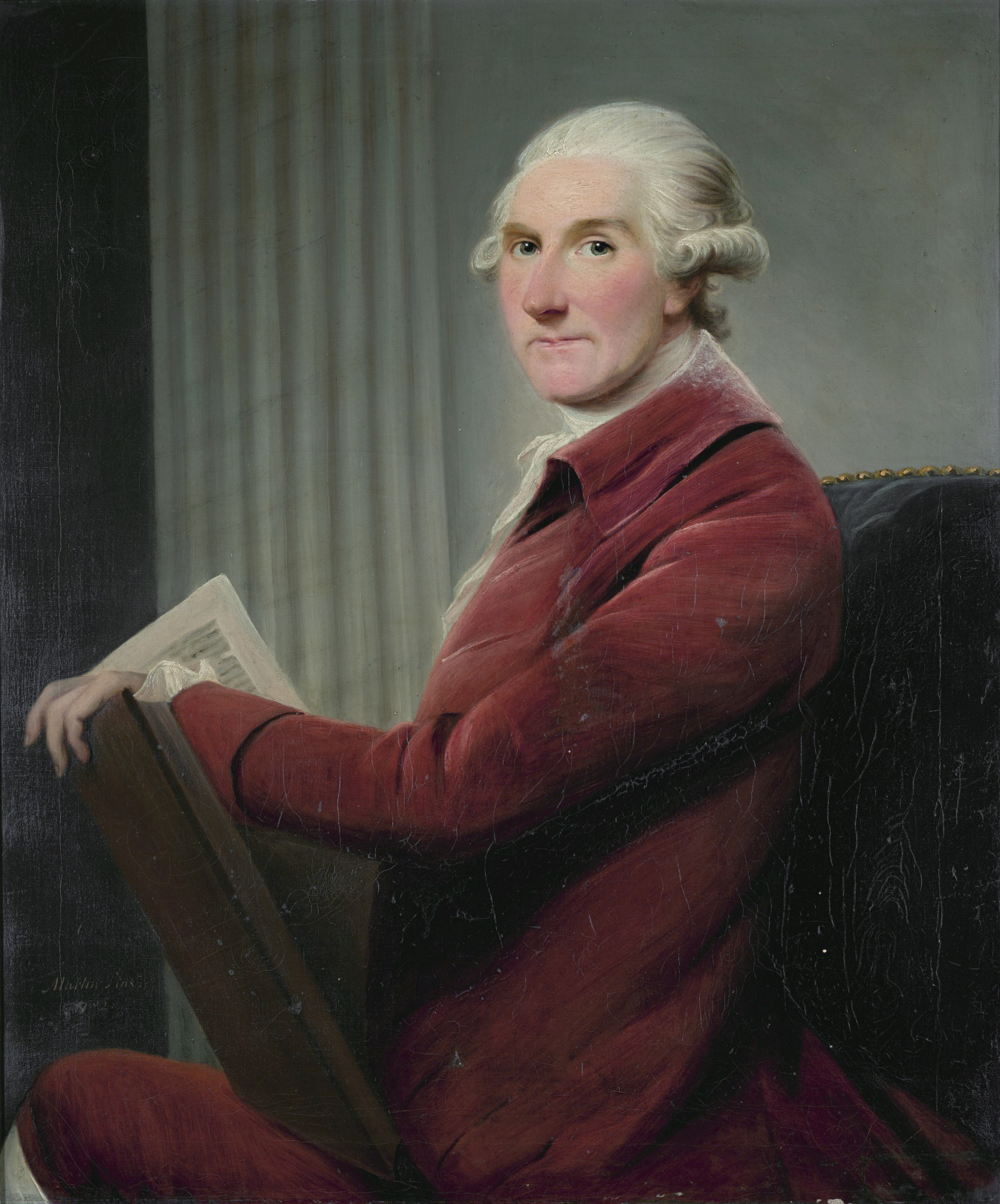
David Leslie, 6th Earl of Leven and 5th Earl of Melville (1722-1802), painting by David Martin, 1782.

David Leslie, 6th Earl of Leven (4 May 1722 – 9 June 1802) was the son of Alexander Leslie, 5th Earl of Leven.

Grand Master of Scottish Freemasons 1759–61; Deputy Governor of the Bank of Scotland; a Lord of Police 1772–82; High Commissioner to the General Assembly of the Church of Scotland 1783–1801.

Prior to 1767 he lived in a mansion on the Royal Mile of Edinburgh between Toddrick's Wynd and Skinners Close. But in 1767 built or remodelled Gayfield House, north of the city (now absorbed into the New Town). He sold the house in the late 18th century to Sir John Wardlaw of Pitreavie.

He died at his final home: 2 St Andrew Square in Edinburgh's New Town.

== Family ==
On 29 July 1747, he married Wilhelmina Nisbet, daughter of William Nisbet and they had eight children:

- Lady Mary Elizabeth Leslie (1767–1820)
- Lady Charlotte Leslie (1761–1830)
- Alexander Leslie-Melville, 7th Earl of Leven (1749–1820)
- The Hon. William Leslie (Melville) (1751–1777)
- General The Hon. David Leslie (1755–1838)
- Lady Jane Leslie (1753–1829)
- Lt.-Gen. The Hon John Leslie (1759–1824)
- The Hon. George Leslie (1766–1812)
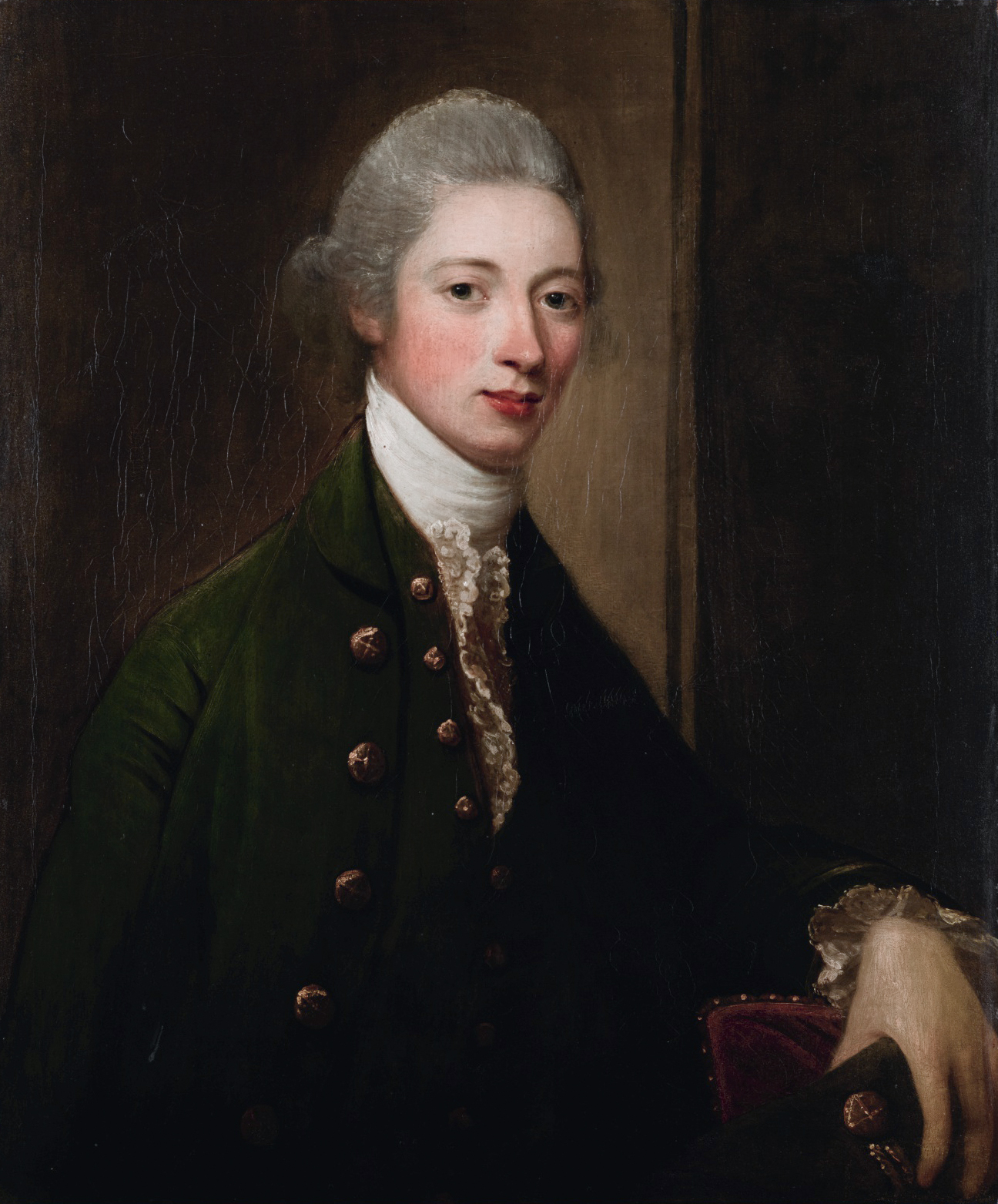
Alexander Leslie-Melville, 7th Earl of Leven, painting by David Martin

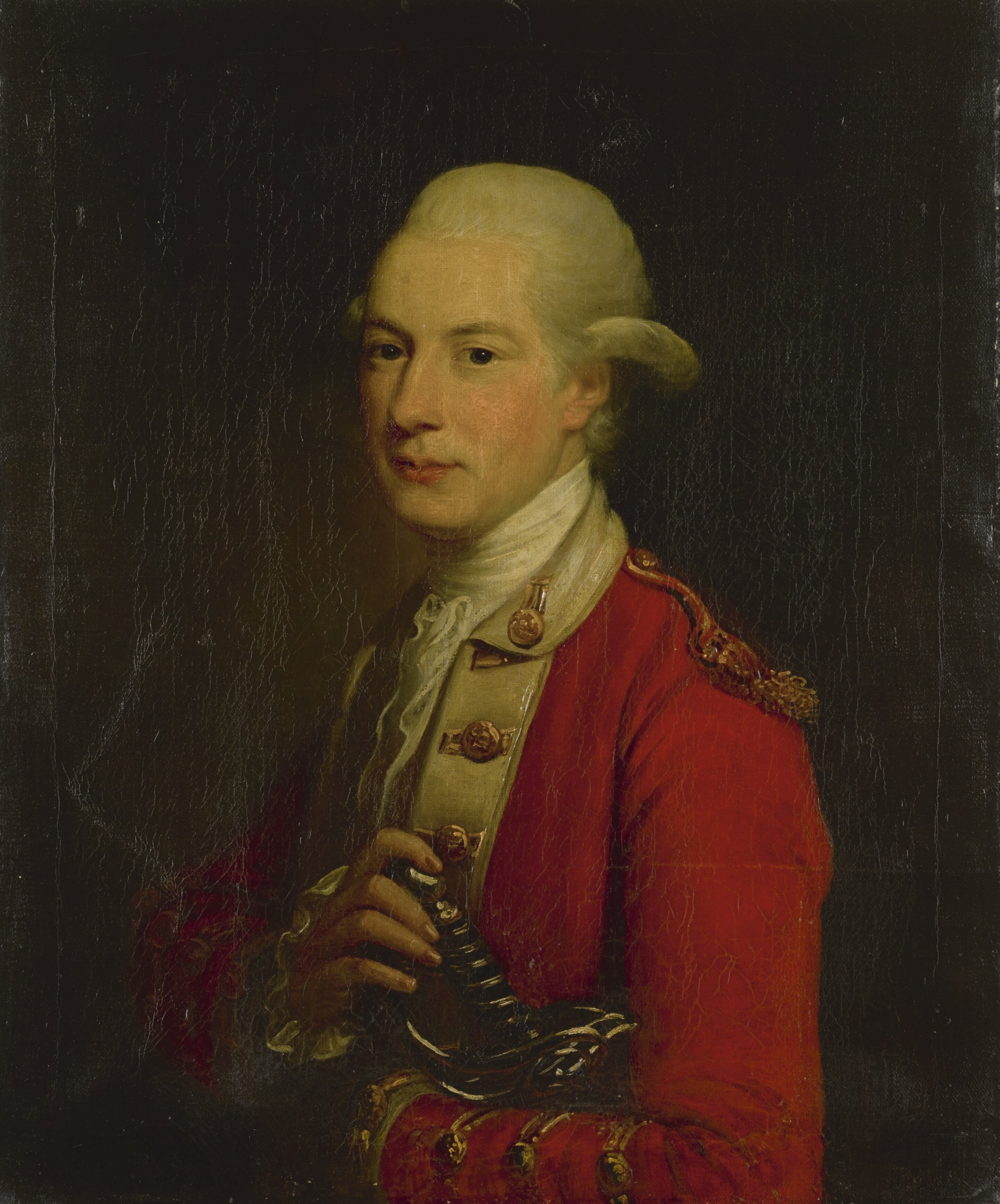
General The Hon. David Leslie, painting by David Martin.

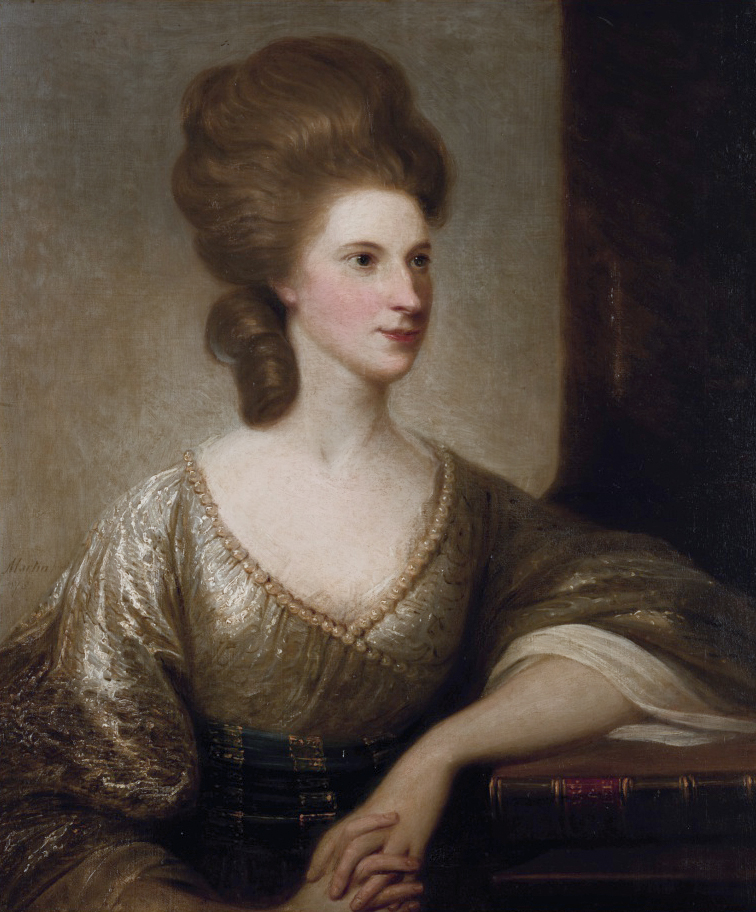
Lady Jane Leslie, painting by David Martin, 1781.

Masonic offices
Preceded by The Earl of Galloway	Grand Master of the Grand Lodge of Scotland; 1759–1761	Succeeded by The Earl of Elgin
Political offices
Preceded by The Earl of Dalhousie	Lord High Commissioner to the General Assembly of the Church of Scotland; 1783–1801	Succeeded by The Lord Napier
Peerage of Scotland
Preceded by Alexander Leslie	Earl of Leven; Earl of Melville; 1754–1802	Succeeded by Alexander Leslie-Melville
