= Lord High Commissioner to the General Assembly of the Church of Scotland =

British royal representative

- Royal Standard of Scotland

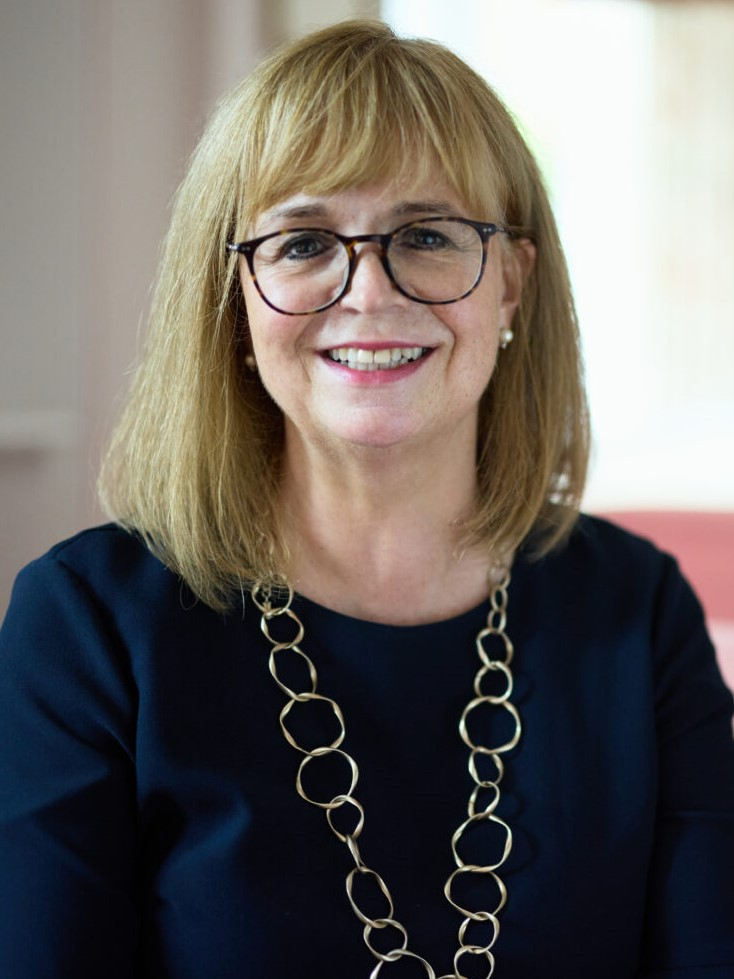
- Incumbent; Lady Elish Angiolini since 10 December 2024
- Style: His or Her Grace
- Residence: Palace of Holyroodhouse
- Appointer: The Monarch
- Term length: 1 year
- Formation: 1580; 446 years ago
- First holder: James Balfour of Pittendreich

The Lord High Commissioner to the General Assembly of the Church of Scotland is the British monarch's personal representative to the General Assembly of the Church of Scotland (the Kirk), reflecting the Church's role as the national church of Scotland and the monarch's role as protector and member of that Church. In its history, the office holder has been the personal representatives to all Scottish monarchs, and later British monarchs, following the Union of the Crowns.

Alongside the Moderator of the General Assembly of the Church of Scotland, the Lord High Commissioner to the General Assembly of the Church of Scotland is arguably one of the two most prominent figures in the Church of Scotland.

== History ==
Lord High Commissioners were appointed to the Parliament of the Kingdom of Scotland between 1603 and 1707 as the monarch's personal representative. The Act of Union 1707 made this function redundant, but a Lord High Commissioner to the General Assembly of the Church of Scotland has been appointed each year, as the monarch's personal representative, since 1690.

The right of the monarch to be present at the General Assembly is enshrined in the Church of Scotland's confessional standard, the Westminster Confession of Faith, which says that the "civil magistrate... hath power to call synods, to be present at them, and to provide that whatsoever is transacted in them be according to the mind of God" (XXIII.3).

Prior to 1929, the General Assembly was held in the former Tolbooth Highland St John's Church on Edinburgh's Royal Mile (this building is no longer used as a church, instead being converted into "The Hub" for the Edinburgh International Festival society), where a throne was provided for the use of the Lord High Commissioner. The union of the Church of Scotland and the United Free Church of Scotland took place in 1929. Since 1930 the General Assembly has always met in the former United Free Church Assembly Hall on The Mound, Edinburgh. The Lord High Commissioner sits on the throne in the Royal Gallery, which is technically "outside" the Assembly Hall—symbolising the independence of the Church in matters spiritual from state interference.

The first General Assembly of the newly united church in 1929 was held in halls in Annandale Street, Edinburgh (now a bus garage), the only building large enough. Difficulty in accessing the Royal Gallery in this temporary location led to a seemingly trivial but nevertheless embarrassing dispute over protocol, whereby the Lord High Commissioner (the Earl of Inverness, later King George VI) would have had to enter through the Assembly Hall itself—an act of symbolic state interference in the hard-won spiritual independence of the church. The Moderator, Dr John White, was adamant that this would be unacceptable, even suggesting that the post of Lord High Commissioner could be dispensed with. Ultimately, the office of Lord High Commissioner was retained following negotiations and subsequent agreements.

=== Roman Catholic Relief Act 1829 ===
Church of Scotland (Lord High Commissioner) Act 2025 (Note: Section 2(3).)
- Act of Parliament
- Parliament of the United Kingdom
- Long title: An Act to make provision for persons of the Roman Catholic faith to be eligible to hold the office of His Majesty’s High Commissioner to the General Assembly of the Church of Scotland.
- Citation: 2025 c. 9
- Introduced by: Pat McFadden (Commons); Baroness Smith of Basildon (Lords)
- Territorial extent: England and Wales; Scotland; Northern Ireland; (Note: Section 2 (1).)

Dates
- Royal assent: 3 April 2025
- Commencement: 3 April 2025 (Note: Section 2 (2).)

Other legislation
- Amends: Roman Catholic Relief Act 1829

Status: Current legislation

Text of the Church of Scotland (Lord High Commissioner) Act 2025 as in force today (including any amendments) within the United Kingdom, from legislation.gov.uk.

In 2025, the restrictions on the Lord High Commissioner being a Roman Catholic were lifted, by the passing of the Church of Scotland (Lord High Commissioner) Act 2025 (c. 9) which amended the Roman Catholic Relief Act 1829 (10 Geo. 4. c. 7).

The amendments were made after it was announced that Lady Elish Angiolini KC was expected to be the first Roman Catholic to be appointed to the position.

== Responsibilities of office ==
=== Functions ===
The office has always been largely ceremonial. The person appointed invariably has a distinguished record of public service in Scotland as well as having close connections with the church, often being an Elder of the Church of Scotland.

On behalf of the monarch, the Lord High Commissioner attends the General Assembly, makes opening and closing addresses to the Assembly, and carries out a number of official visits and ceremonial functions (not all related to the Church of Scotland). At the formal opening of the General Assembly, the Principal Clerk reads out the Royal Warrant appointing the Lord High Commissioner, who is then invited to address the Assembly. All ministers, elders and deacons appointed by Presbyteries to attend the General Assembly are known as "Commissioners" and have voting powers; the Lord High Commissioner, however, has no vote, nor may he/she intervene in debates.

Apart from his/her opening and closing addresses, the Lord High Commissioner makes no further intervention in Assembly debates but will be in daily attendance for at least part of each day's business. Following the Assembly, the Lord High Commissioner personally informs The King about the business of the week.

The Lord High Commissioner also visits the General Assembly of the Free Church of Scotland annually, which is held on the same week as the General Assembly of the Church of Scotland, also within Edinburgh.

=== Form of address ===
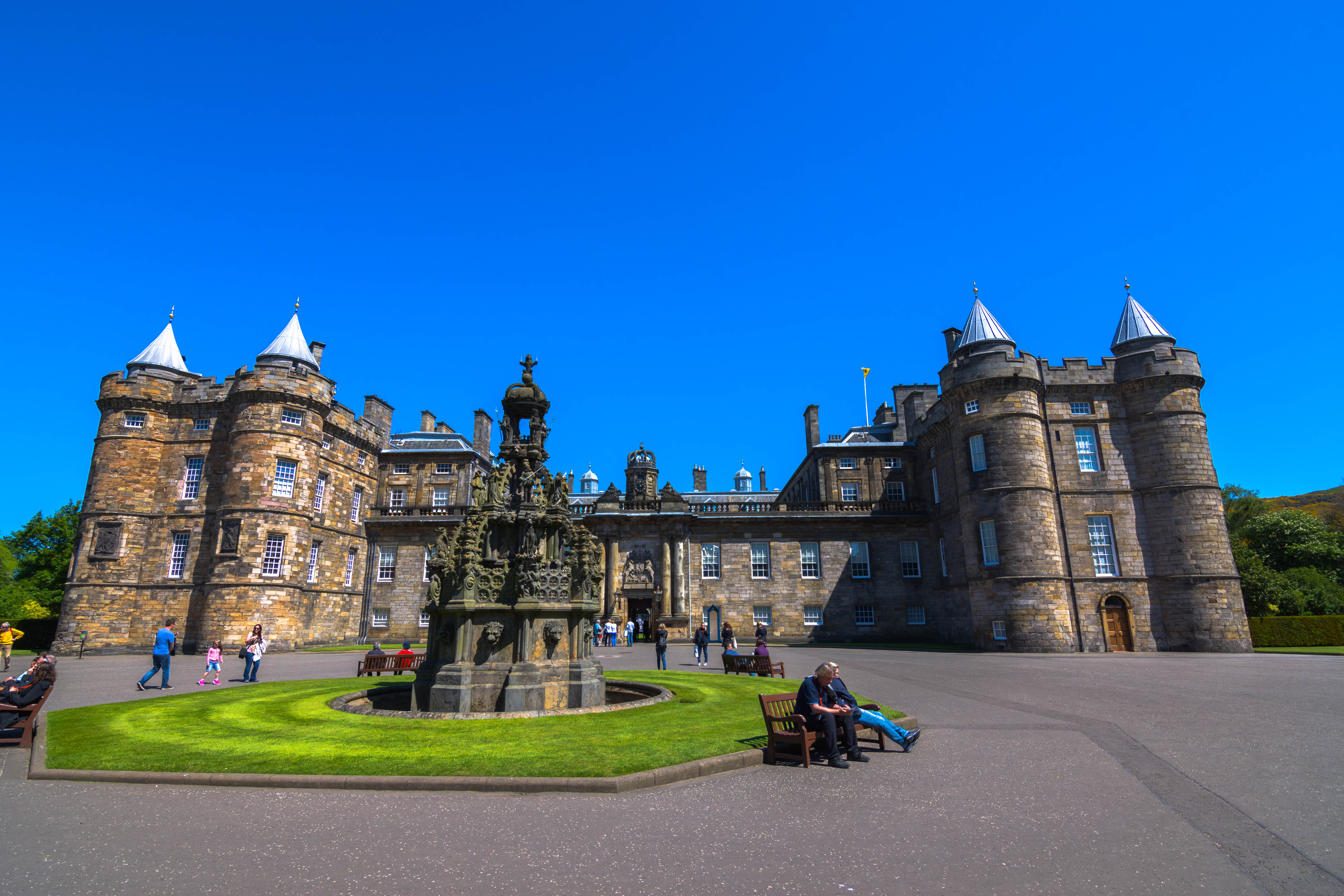
The Palace of Holyroodhouse is the Commissioner's residence

While the General Assembly is meeting, the Lord High Commissioner is treated as if a regent. By custom, he or she is addressed as "Your Grace" and is greeted with a bow or curtsey. When the Princess Royal was appointed in 1996, she was styled as "Her Grace" for the duration rather than her normal dynastic style "Her Royal Highness" because the Lord High Commissioner is ranked higher in the order of precedence.

If a woman is appointed to the office, the alternative title "His Majesty's High Commissioner" may, if requested, be used. Margaret Herbison was the first woman to hold the post (1970 and 1971).

=== Residence ===
Since 1834 the Lord High Commissioner has resided at the Palace of Holyroodhouse and gave a garden party for Commissioners to the General Assembly on the Saturday afternoon of Assembly week and other hospitality. He or she is entitled to use the Scottish Royal Banner, and has precedence immediately after the King and before the rest of the Royal Family. Even his or her official car receives special treatment and, except for the King's, is the only vehicle in the country not to have number plates. However, the plates are re-attached during the closing speech of the Assembly, and the Lord High Commissioner returns to his royal but temporary residence as an ordinary citizen. In recent years, the garden party has been replaced by the "Heart and Soul" event, held in Princes Street Gardens and attended by the Lord High Commissioner.

== Household ==
There is a Household of His Grace the Lord High Commissioner. This includes the Purse Bearer (who is the head of the Household), Chaplain, Aides-de-Camp (three in 1949), a Lady-in-Waiting, Extra Lady-in-Waiting, and Maids of Honour (three in 1949). The Macebearer bears the Lord President's Mace or the Old Exchequer Mace. The Master of the Horse is no longer appointed. The subordinate staff further includes the Assistant to the Purse Bearer, and a Lady's Maid. The Household make no financial demands on the funds of the Church of Scotland, which are devoted exclusively to the Parish and Mission work of the Kirk.

== List of office holders ==
=== Lord high commissioners ===
- 1580: The Laird of Lundie & Sir James Balfour of Pittendreich or James Halyburton
- 1581: William Cunningham, 4th Laird of Caprington
- April 1582: Ralph Kerr
- October 1582: James Halyburton & Colonel William Stewart of Houston
- incomplete
- 1638: James Hamilton, 1st Duke of Hamilton
- 1639: John Stewart, 1st Earl of Traquair
- 1640: none
- 1641: John Wemyss, 1st Earl of Wemyss
- 1642: Charles Seton, 2nd Earl of Dunfermline
- 1643: Sir Thomas Hope, 1st Baronet
- 1644–1645: none
- 1646: Letter from the King regretting that no Commissioner could be sent
- 1647–1650: none
- 1651: Alexander Lindsay, 1st Earl of Balcarres
- 1652: none
- 1653: none
- 1653–1690: no General Assembly
- 1690: John Carmichael, 2nd Lord Carmichael
- 1692: Robert Kerr, 4th and 2nd Earl of Lothian
- 1694–1699: John Carmichael, 2nd Lord Carmichael
- 1700: James Ogilvy, Viscount Seafield (became an earl before serving again in 1703)
- 1701: William Johnstone, 2nd Earl of Annandale and Hartfell (became a marquess before serving again in 1705 and 1711)
- 1702: Patrick Hume, 1st Earl of Marchmont
- 1703: James Ogilvy, 1st Earl of Seafield (succeeded as Earl of Findlater before serving again in 1724)
- 1704: William Ross, 12th Lord Ross
- 1705: William Johnstone, 1st Marquess of Annandale
- 1706–1710: David Boyle, 1st Earl of Glasgow
- 1711: William Johnstone, 1st Marquess of Annandale
- 1712–1714: John Murray, 1st Duke of Atholl
- 1715–1721: John Hamilton-Leslie, 9th Earl of Rothes
- 1722: Hugh Campbell, 3rd Earl of Loudoun
- 1723: Charles Hope, 1st Earl of Hopetoun
- 1724: James Ogilvy, 4th Earl of Findlater
- 1725–1726: Hugh Campbell, 3rd Earl of Loudoun
- 1727: James Ogilvy, 4th Earl of Findlater
- 1728: Hugh Campbell, 3rd Earl of Loudoun
- 1729: David Erskine, 9th Earl of Buchan
- 1730–1731: Hugh Campbell, 3rd Earl of Loudoun
- 1732–1738: William Kerr, 3rd Marquess of Lothian
- 1739–1740: John Carmichael, 3rd Earl of Hyndford
- 1741–1753: Alexander Melville, 5th Earl of Leven
- 1754: John Hope, 2nd Earl of Hopetoun
- 1755–1763: Charles Cathcart, 9th Lord Cathcart
- 1764–1772: John Boyle, 3rd Earl of Glasgow
- 1773–1776: Charles Cathcart, 9th Lord Cathcart
- 1777–1782: George Ramsay, 8th Earl of Dalhousie
- 1783–1801: David Leslie, 6th Earl of Leven
- 1802–1816: Francis Napier, 8th Lord Napier
- 1817–1818: William Hay, 17th Earl of Erroll
- 1819–1824: George Douglas, 16th Earl of Morton
- 1825–1830: James Forbes, 17th Lord Forbes
- 1831–1841: Robert Hamilton, 8th Lord Belhaven and Stenton
- 1842–1846: John Crichton-Stuart, 2nd Marquess of Bute
- 1847–1851: Robert Hamilton, 8th Lord Belhaven and Stenton
- 1852: William Murray, 4th Earl of Mansfield and Mansfield
- 1853–1857: Robert Hamilton, 8th Lord Belhaven and Stenton
- 1858–1859: William Murray, 4th Earl of Mansfield and Mansfield
- 1860–1866: Robert Hamilton, 8th Lord Belhaven and Stenton
- 1867–1868: George Baillie-Hamilton, 10th Earl of Haddington
- 1869–1871: John Dalrymple, 10th Earl of Stair
- 1872–1873: David Ogilvy, 10th Earl of Airlie
- 1874–1875: Robert St Clair-Erskine, 4th Earl of Rosslyn
- 1876–1877: Alan Stewart, 10th Earl of Galloway
- 1878–1880: Robert St Clair-Erskine, 4th Earl of Rosslyn
- 1881–1885: John Hamilton-Gordon, 7th Earl of Aberdeen
- 1886: Thomas Hovell-Thurlow-Cumming-Bruce, 5th Baron Thurlow
- 1887–1889: John Hope, 7th Earl of Hopetoun
- 1889–1892: William Hay, 10th Marquess of Tweeddale
- 1893–1895: Gavin Campbell, 1st Marquess of Breadalbane
- 1896–1897: William Hay, 10th Marquess of Tweeddale
- 1898–1906: Ronald Leslie-Melville, 11th Earl of Leven
- 1907–1909: Arthur Kinnaird, 11th Lord Kinnaird
- 1910: John Dalrymple, 11th Earl of Stair
- 1911–1914: Edward Tennant, 1st Baron Glenconner
- 1915: John Hamilton-Gordon, 7th Earl of Aberdeen
- 1916–1917: Douglas Graham, 5th Duke of Montrose
- 1918–1920: John Stewart-Murray, 8th Duke of Atholl
- 1921–1922: George Sutherland-Leveson-Gower, 5th Duke of Sutherland
- 1923: Sidney Buller-Fullerton-Elphinstone, 16th Lord Elphinstone
- 1924: James Brown MP (made a privy counsellor before serving again in 1930)
- 1925–1926: Edward Bruce, 10th Earl of Elgin
- 1927–1928: John Dalrymple, 12th Earl of Stair
- 1929: Prince Albert, Earl of Inverness
- 1930–1931: James Brown
- 1932: Sir Iain Colquhoun, 7th Baronet
- 1933–1934: John Buchan
- 1935: Prince George, Earl of St Andrews
- 1936–1937: Kenneth Kinnaird, 12th Lord Kinnaird
- 1938–1939: Sir John Gilmour, 2nd Baronet
- 1940–1941: Sir Iain Colquhoun, 7th Baronet
- 1942–1943: James Graham, 6th Duke of Montrose
- 1944–1945: Victor Hope, 2nd Marquess of Linlithgow
- 1946–1947: George Mathers (made a privy counsellor before serving again in 1948)
- 1948: George Mathers
- 1949: Prince Henry, Lord Culloden
- 1950: Andrew Cunningham, 1st Viscount Cunningham of Hyndhope
- 1951: George Mathers
- 1952: Andrew Cunningham, 1st Viscount Cunningham of Hyndhope
- 1953–1955: Douglas Douglas-Hamilton, 14th Duke of Hamilton
- 1956–1957: Walter Elliot
- 1958: Douglas Douglas-Hamilton, 14th Duke of Hamilton
- 1959–1960: David Charteris, 12th Earl of Wemyss
- 1961–1963: Prince Henry, Lord Culloden
- 1964: General Sir Richard O'Connor
- 1965–1966: Harald Leslie, Lord Birsay
- 1967–1968: John Reith, 1st Baron Reith
- 1969: Elizabeth II attended in person
- 1970: Peggy Herbison
- 1971–1972: Ronald Colville, 2nd Baron Clydesmuir
- 1973–1974: Bernard Fergusson, Baron Ballantrae
- 1975–1976: Sir Hector MacLennan
- 1977: David Charteris, 12th Earl of Wemyss
- 1978–1979: Willie Ross (former Secretary of State for Scotland)
- 1980–1981: Andrew Bruce, 11th Earl of Elgin
- 1982–1983: Col Sir John Gilmour, 3rd Baronet
- 1984–1985: Charles Maclean, Baron Maclean
- 1986–1987: John Arbuthnott, 16th Viscount of Arbuthnott
- 1988–1989: Captain Sir Iain Tennant
- 1990–1991: Donald Ross, Lord Ross, Lord Justice Clerk
- 1992–1993: Norman Macfarlane, Baron Macfarlane of Bearsden
- 1994–1995: Lady Marion Fraser
- 1996: Anne, Princess Royal
- 1997: Norman Macfarlane, Baron Macfarlane of Bearsden
- 1998–1999: Norman Hogg, Baron Hogg of Cumbernauld
- 2000: Prince Charles, Duke of Rothesay
- 2001: George Younger, 4th Viscount Younger of Leckie
- 2002: Elizabeth II attended in person
- 2003–2004: David Steel, Baron Steel of Aikwood
- 2005–2006: James Mackay, Baron Mackay of Clashfern
- 2007: Prince Andrew, Earl of Inverness
- 2008–2009: George Reid
- 2010–2011: David Wilson, Baron Wilson of Tillyorn
- 2012–2013: James Douglas-Hamilton, Baron Selkirk of Douglas
- 2014: Prince Edward, Earl of Wessex
- 2015–2016: David Hope, Baron Hope of Craighead
- 2017: Anne, Princess Royal
- 2018–2019: Richard Scott, 10th Duke of Buccleuch
- 2020–2021: Prince William, Earl of Strathearn (2020 Assembly cancelled due to the COVID-19 pandemic.)
- 2022–2023: Patrick Hodge, Lord Hodge
- 2024: Prince Edward, Duke of Edinburgh
- 2025–2026: Lady Elish Angiolini

=== List of purse bearers ===
- c.1930: (Sir) John Charles Couper
- 1930–1958: Lt Col Sir Edward Daymonde-Stevenson
- 1959–1960: David Charles Scott-Moncrieff
- 1961–1969: Sir Alastair Blair
- 1969–1988: Sir Charles Fraser
- 1988–2001: Robin Blair
- 2001–present: Tom Murray

== See also ==
- Supreme Governor of the Church of England
- List of moderators of the General Assembly of the Church of Scotland
- Order of precedence in Scotland
- Lord Lieutenant
- Lord High Commissioner to the Parliament of Scotland
