= David Leslie, 3rd Earl of Leven =

Scottish politician and army officer

The Right Honourable The Earl of Leven
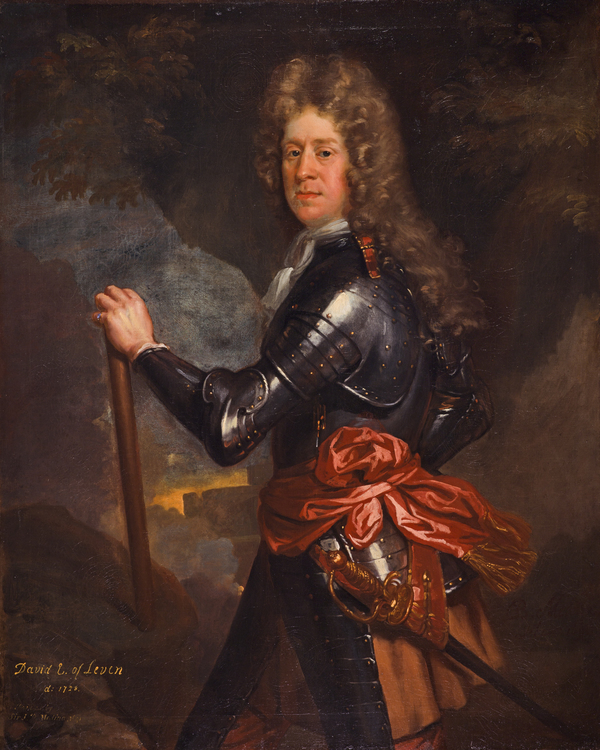
- Portrait by John Baptist Medina, 1691
- Born: 5 May 1660
- Died: 6 June 1728 (aged 68)
- Parents: George Melville, 1st Earl of Melville (father); Catherine Leslie (mother)

David Leslie, 3rd Earl of Leven (born David Melville; 5 May 1660 – 6 June 1728) was a Scottish politician and army officer. The third son of George Melville, 1st Earl of Melville and his second wife Catherine, he shared the Whig political and the Presbyterian religious sympathies of his father. In 1681, with the death of the rival claimant, John Leslie, 1st Duke of Rothes, he was permitted to enter into the Earldom of Leven. In 1683, Leven and his father were suspected of complicity in the Rye House Plot, a Whig conspiracy to assassinate Charles II and his brother James, Duke of York. To escape arrest they fled to the Netherlands where they joined the band of British Protestant exiles at the court of Prince William of Orange.

Here Leven was used by William to obtain the support of German princes for his invasion of England in 1688, Leven himself having raised a regiment for that invasion, in the course of which he received the surrender of the town of Plymouth in south Devonshire. He became a Privy Councillor of Scotland in 1689, and fought at the Battle of Killiecrankie that year. He also served as Keeper of Edinburgh Castle between 1689 and 1702, and again between 1704 and 1712. Leven was also a Commissioner for the Pacification of the Highlands from 1689.

Leven served as Governor of the Bank of Scotland between 1697 and 1728, and in 1702 was promoted to brigadier-general, followed by major-general in 1704. He became Master of the Scottish Ordnance in 1705, and Commander-in-Chief, Scotland in 1706. Also in 1706 he was elected one of the representative peers to sit in the House of Lords after the Acts of Union in 1707 abolished the Parliament of Scotland. He became a lieutenant-general in 1707. He became a Commissioner for the Union in 1707 and was one of the original Representative Peers for Scotland from 1707 until 1710. He was dismissed from all offices in 1712. He succeeded his father as Earl of Melville on 20 May 1707, but did not use the title.

Military offices
Preceded by The Duke of Gordon	Governor of Edinburgh Castle; 1702–1704	Succeeded by The Earl of March
Preceded by The Earl of March	Governor of Edinburgh Castle; 1705–1712	Succeeded by The Duke of Argyll
Preceded by George Ramsay	Commander-in-Chief, Scotland; 1706–1712	Succeeded by The Duke of Argyll
Peerage of Scotland
Preceded by Alexander Leslie	Earl of Leven; 1681–1728	Succeeded by David Melville
Preceded by George Melville	Earl of Melville; 1707–1728	Succeeded by David Melville
