= Leslie M. Alexander (American scholar) =

Leslie M. Alexander is a professor and author in the United States. She is the Dr. Martin Luther King Jr. Professor in the department of history at Rutgers University.

The African American Intellectual History Society published an interview with her.

== Writings ==
- African or American?: Black Identity and Political Activism in New York City, 1784-1861 University of Illinois Press (2011)
- Fear of a Black Republic: Haiti and the Birth of Black Internationalism in the United States University of Illinois Press (2022)
- Ideas in Unexpected Places: Reimagining the Boundaries of Black Intellectual History, co-author, Northwestern University Press (2022)
