= Branston Hall =

Coordinates: 53°11′39″N 0°28′57″W

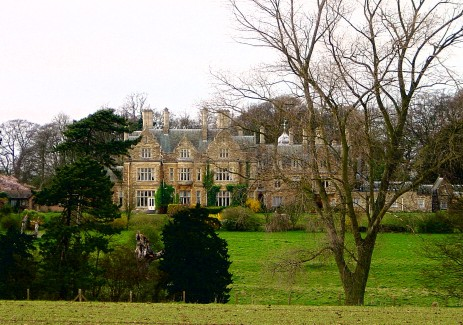
Branston Hall

Branston Hall is a country house in the village of Branston, Lincolnshire, England. The hall, a Grade II listed building, is set in 88 acres (3.56 square kilometres) of wooded parkland and lakes.

Originally commissioned as the family seat of the Melville family, the house became an RAF hospital during the Second World War, and then a sanatorium run by Lindsey County Council. It lay derelict in the 1970s and 1980s, underwent restoration and conversion into a retirement home in the late 1980s, and is now restored and converted into a three-star hotel. Weddings are often held at the hotel.

Designed by John Macvicar Anderson in 1885, the house was built in Elizabethan Revival style.

== Early history ==
Branston Hall Grounds were the inherited estate of Sir Cecil Wray, 11th Baronet (1678–1736) (a descendant of Catherine Parr), whose family had been Baronets and parliamentarians in Lincolnshire since 1611 (see also Wray Baronets), and whose main residence was in Fillingham, north of Lincoln. Busts of Sir Cecil and his wife Mary can be seen in Branston All Saints Church. The property was inherited from Sir Cecil by his daughter out of wedlock, Anne Casey. Anne Casey married Lord Vere Bertie (1712–1768), the son of the 1st Duke of Ancaster. In 1735 Lord Vere Bertie built Branston old hall (a building which preceded the current Branston Hall, and which was located on a different part of the grounds, beside Hall Lane) The couple had four children. Lord Vere Bertie died in 1768 and his wife Anne continued to live at the house until her death in 1779. The property was then passed to their daughter Albinia who had married George Hobart, 3rd Earl of Buckinghamshire. In 1829, the old hall was advertised for sale and it seems that shortly after this it was purchased by Alexander Leslie Melville (1800–1881).

== The Leslie-Melville family ==
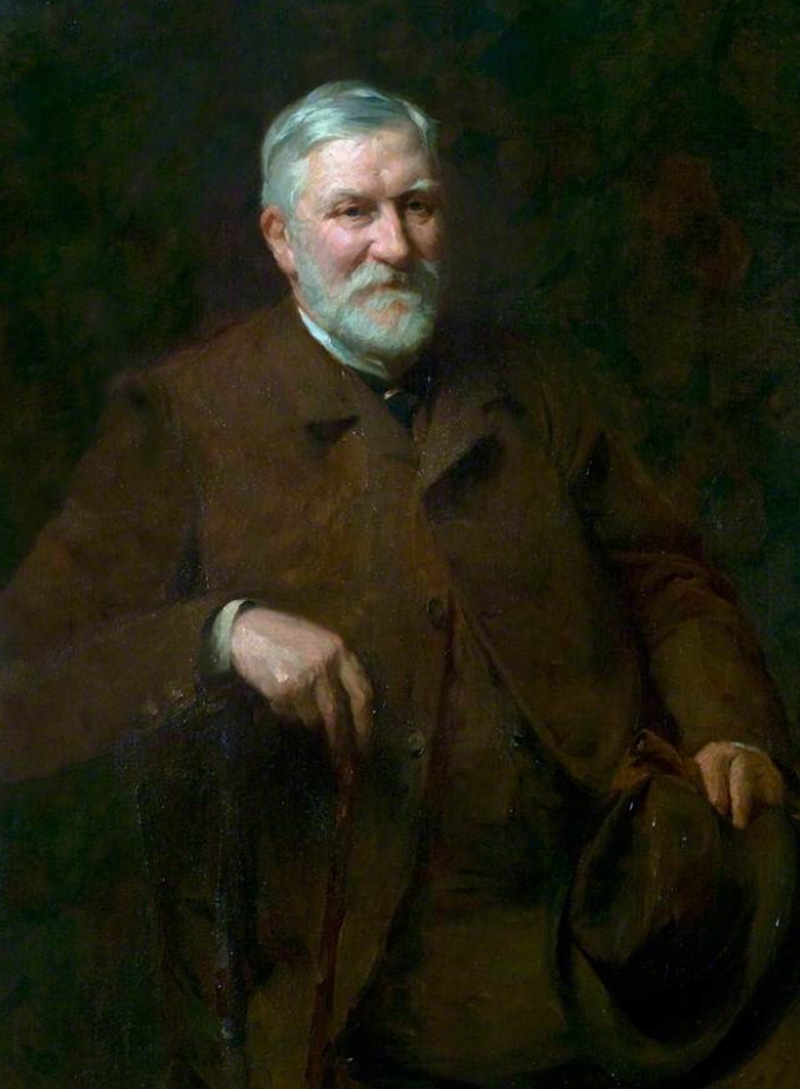
Alexander Samuel Leslie Melville

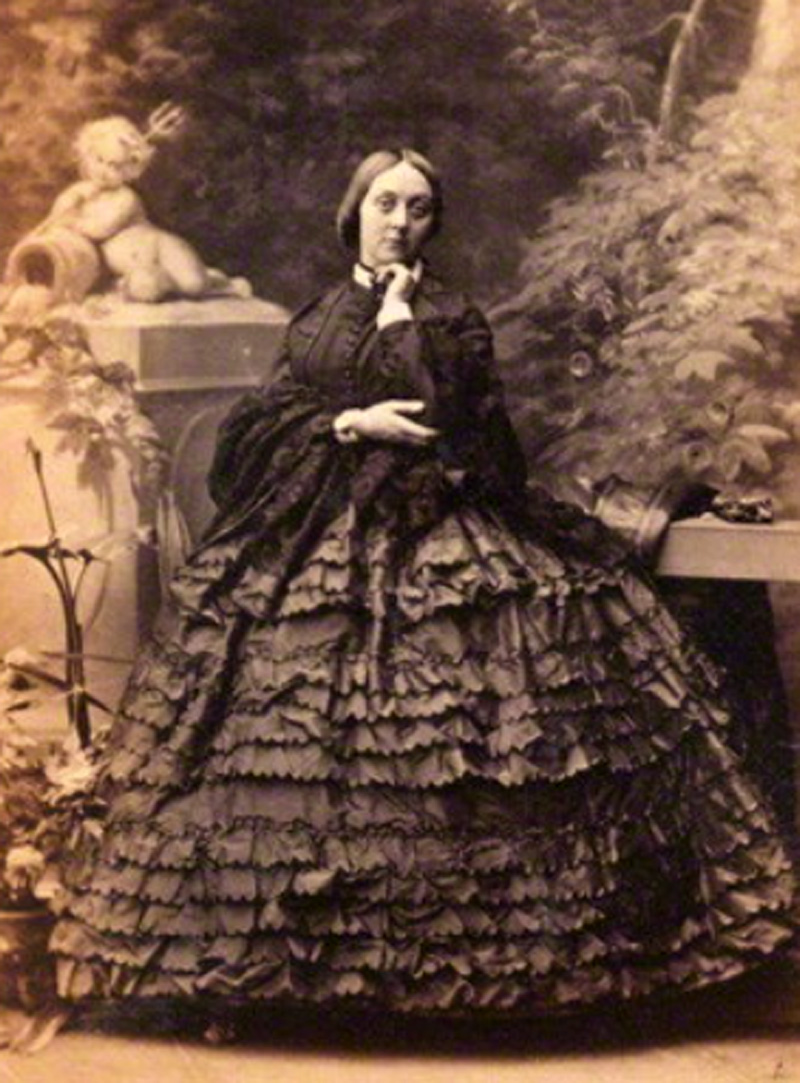
Albinia Frances Leslie Melville, wife of Alexander Samuel Leslie Melville

Alexander Leslie Melville (1800–1881) was born in 1800 in Scotland. His father was Alexander Leslie Melville, the 7th Earl of Leven. In 1825, he married Charlotte Smith, the daughter of Samuel Smith M.P, of Woodhall Park, Hertfordshire. The couple had twelve children.

Their eldest son was Alexander Samuel Leslie Melville (1829–1919) and he inherited Branston old hall when his father died in 1881. He was born in 1829 and in 1858 he married Albinia Frances Broderick, daughter of Charles Brodrick, 6th Viscount Midleton. The couple had seven children.

In 1837 Alexander Leslie Melville constructed a private school on Hall Lane, which was attended by 70 children, each of whom paid 1p-2p per week.

In 1884, he commissioned the architect John MacVicar Anderson to build the present house. The old hall, still being in a good state of repair became accommodation for the servants and the staff. There were numerous servants employed by the family. The 1901 Census shows that there were six domestic maids, a butler, three footmen and a groom at the hall as well as outdoor gardening staff.

In 1903, the old hall burnt down and was removed from the site. Photos of the old hall have been preserved by Branston History Group. Albinia died in 1918 and Alexander died the following year in 1919. In 1920, the property was sold. In the intervening years the site of the old hall has been sensitively redeveloped.

The Melville family provided land for the village hall and recreation ground on Lincoln Road, Branston in the early 1920s. The heir of the Leslie-Melville family is the Lord Balgonie, and many items from Branston Hall are now found on the family's estate in the Scottish Highlands.

== Grounds ==
The grounds were once grazed by sheep but since around the year 2000 have been mechanically mown. There are many large beech trees and sycamores. Wildlife include muntjac deer, tawny owl and great cormorant. Lamium galeobdolon, Galium odoratum and Ruscus aculeatus grow in the beech woods and these are considered to be indicators of ancient woodland. Other plant species typical of shady woodland include Hyacinthoides non-scripta, Sanicula europaea and Mercurialis perennis.

In 1906, 10 Bronze Age axes were found on the grounds of Branston Hall.

On the grounds there is a spring-fed well, known as Anne's Well, which it is believed supplied fresh water to the old hall building (photographs here). The well was probably named after Anne Casey, who owned the property in the 1700s, or possibly St. Anne. It is covered with a stone which bore the inscription:

"Clear may thy Waters ever flow,

Nor Gusts of Ruffling Tempest know,

Pure and unsullied as the fair

Whose Emblematic Name you bear"

There is evidence of boating on the lake, in former times (remains of a small boat and boathouse).
