= Leslie Alexander (rabbi) =

American rabbi

Leslie Alexander became the first female rabbi of a major Conservative Jewish synagogue in the United States in 1986 at Adat Ari El synagogue in North Hollywood. She was chosen over five male candidates. Alexander was ordained by the Reform seminary Hebrew Union College-Jewish Institute of Religion in 1983, after studying at the Conservative movement's University of Judaism in Los Angeles; Conservative Judaism did not ordain women at the time. She wanted to be a rabbi since she was 17, and was encouraged in her ambitions by her parents. Her first major job after being ordained was as director of adult activities and community education at the Jewish Community Centers in San Diego, where she also met her husband, Dr. Kenneth Atchison. She kept her maiden name upon marriage because most of her family was killed in the Holocaust, and as an only child she did not want to have her name end.

Alexander is now the community chaplain for Silicon Valley, and sits on two ethics committees in local hospitals, as well as serving on the Santa Clara County Child Abuse Council.
