= Lord High Commissioner to the Parliament of Scotland =

Monarch's personal representative to the pre-union Parliament of the Kingdom of Scotland

The Lord High Commissioner to the Parliament of Scotland was the monarch of Scotland's personal representative to the Parliament of Scotland. From the accession of James VI of Scotland to the throne of England in 1603, a Lord High Commissioner was appointed from among the senior nobility to represent the Scottish monarch in parliament when he or she was absent, as was usually the case up to 1707. (Note: The only Scottish monarchs to preside in person at the Parliament of Scotland between 1603 and 1707 were James VI in May 1617; Charles I in June 1633 and August to November 1641; and Charles II in November 1650.) The Act of Union 1707, which merged the Parliament of Scotland and the Parliament of England to create the Parliament of Great Britain, rendered the post redundant.

The Lord High Commissioner represented Crown authority and sat on the throne within the parliamentary chamber. The Commissioner gave royal assent to all acts of parliament by touching the final copy of each act with the sceptre. They were the custodian of the Crown's legislative agenda and were effectively the heads of government in Scotland during this period.

== List of Lords High Commissioner ==
Image	Name	Tenure
	John Graham, 3rd Earl of Montrose	1605
	Ludovic Stewart, 2nd Duke of Lennox	1607
	George Keith, 5th Earl Marischal	1609
	Alexander Seton, 1st Earl of Dunfermline	1612
	James Hamilton, 2nd Marquess of Hamilton	1621
	John Stewart, 1st Earl of Traquair	1639
	John Elphinstone, 2nd Lord Balmerino	1641
	James Hamilton, 1st Duke of Hamilton	1646
	John Middleton, 1st Earl of Middleton	1661, 1662
	John Leslie, 7th Earl of Rothes	1663, 1665, 1667
	John Maitland, 1st Duke of Lauderdale	1669, 1670, 1672, 1673, 1674, 1678
	James, Duke of Albany (later James VII)	1681
	William Douglas, 1st Duke of Queensberry	1685
	Alexander Stuart, 5th Earl of Moray	1686
	William Douglas, Duke of Hamilton	1689
	George Melville, 1st Earl of Melville	1690
	William Douglas, Duke of Hamilton	1693
	John Hay, 1st Marquess of Tweeddale	1695
	John Murray, Earl of Tullibardine	1696
	Patrick Hume, 1st Earl of Marchmont	1698
	James Douglas, 2nd Duke of Queensberry	1700, 1702, 1703
	John Hay, 2nd Marquess of Tweeddale	1704
	John Campbell, 2nd Duke of Argyll	1705
	James Douglas, 2nd Duke of Queensberry	1706 - 1707

== See also ==
- Commissioner (Scottish Parliament)
- Lord High Commissioner to the General Assembly of the Church of Scotland
- Lord Chancellor of Scotland
