= Earl of Leven =

Title in the Scottish peerage

Earldom of Leven held with Earldom of Melville
- Arms of the Earl of Leven
- Creation date: 1641
- Creation: First
- Created by: Charles I
- Peerage: Peerage of Scotland
- First holder: Alexander Leslie
- Present holder: Alexander Ian Leslie-Melville
- Heir presumptive: Archibald Leslie-Melville
- Remainder to: the 1st Earl's heirs male of the body lawfully begotten
- Subsidiary titles: Viscount of Kirkaldie; Lord Melville of Monymaill; Lord Balgonie ( Lord Raith, Monymaill and Balwearie (1690)
- Status: Extant
- Seat: Glenferness House

Earl of Leven (pronounced "Lee-ven") is a title in the Peerage of Scotland. It was created in 1641 for Alexander Leslie. He was succeeded by his grandson Alexander, who was in turn followed by his daughters Margaret and Catherine (who are usually not included in the numbering of the Earls). Thereafter, there was a dispute relating to succession to the title between David Melville and John Leslie, 1st Duke of Rothes. However, in 1681, Melville's claim was admitted after the Duke of Rothes died. In 1707, Melville succeeded to the title Earl of Melville, and thereafter the earldoms have been united.

The other titles held by the Earl are: Viscount of Kirkaldie (created 1690), Lord Melville of Monymaill (1616), Lord Balgonie (1641), Lord Raith, Monymaill and Balwearie (1690). All are in the Peerage of Scotland. The heir apparent to the Earldoms is styled Lord Balgonie.

The family seat is Glenferness House, near Nairn, Highland.

== Earls of Leven (1641) ==
- Alexander Leslie, 1st Earl of Leven (c. 1580–1661)
- Alexander Leslie, 2nd Earl of Leven (c. 1637–1664)
- Margaret Leslie, Countess of Leven (died 1674)
- Catherine Leslie, Countess of Leven (1663–1676)
- David Melville, later Leslie, 3rd Earl of Leven, 2nd Earl of Melville (1660–1728)
- David Leslie, 4th Earl of Leven, 3rd Earl of Melville (1717–1729)
- Alexander Leslie, 5th Earl of Leven, 4th Earl of Melville (died 1754)
- David Leslie, 6th Earl of Leven, 5th Earl of Melville (1722–1802)
- Alexander Leslie-Melville, 7th Earl of Leven, 6th Earl of Melville (1749–1820)
- David Leslie-Melville, 8th Earl of Leven, 7th Earl of Melville (1785–1860)
- John Thornton Leslie-Melville, 9th Earl of Leven, 8th Earl of Melville (1786–1876)
- Alexander Leslie-Melville, 10th Earl of Leven, 9th Earl of Melville (1817–1889)
- Ronald Ruthven Leslie-Melville, 11th Earl of Leven, 10th Earl of Melville (1835–1906)
- John David Melville, 12th Earl of Leven, 11th Earl of Melville (1886–1913)
- Archibald Alexander Leslie-Melville, 13th Earl of Leven, 12th Earl of Melville (1890–1947)
- Alexander Robert Leslie-Melville, 14th Earl of Leven, 13th Earl of Melville (1924–2012)
- Alexander Ian Leslie-Melville, 15th Earl of Leven, 14th Earl of Melville (born 1984)

== Present peer ==
Alexander Ian Leslie-Melville, 15th (or 16th) Earl of Leven (born 29 November 1984) is the only son of David Alexander Leslie-Melville, Lord Balgonie, and his wife Julia Clare Critchley. His father, who was the elder son of the 14th Earl, was killed in 2007 in a skiing accident at Verbier. He succeeded his grandfather to the peerages on 7 April 2012.

The heir presumptive is the present holder's uncle Hon. Archibald Ronald Leslie-Melville (born 1957), whose heir presumptive is the present peer's first cousin once removed James Hugh Leslie-Melville (born 1960), a grandson of the 13th Earl by the Hon. George David Leslie Melville (1924–1997), the younger twin brother of the 14th Earl. Leslie-Melville's heir is his elder son John Alistair Leslie-Melville (born 1991).

== See also ==
- Melville House
- Melville family

== Sources ==
- Chisholm, Hugh, ed. (1911). "Leven and Melville, Earls of" . Encyclopædia Britannica. Vol. 16 (11th ed.). Cambridge University Press. p. 508.
- Hesilrige, Arthur G. M. (1921). Debrett's Peerage and Titles of courtesy. 160A, Fleet street, London, UK: Dean & Son. p. 556.
