= Peerage of Scotland =

Group of hereditary titles

The Peerage of Scotland (Scottish Gaelic: Moraireachd na h-Alba; Scots: Peerage o Scotland) is one of the five divisions of peerages in the United Kingdom and for those peers created by the King of Scotland before 1707. Following that year's Treaty of Union, the Kingdom of Scotland and the Kingdom of England were combined under the name of Great Britain, and a new Peerage of Great Britain was introduced in which subsequent titles were created.

As of November 2025, there are 74 peers of Scotland: 8 dukes (including one royal duke: the Duke of Rothesay), 4 marquesses, 39 earls, 3 viscounts and 20 lords of Parliament (counting peers known by a higher-ranking title in one of the other peerages).

Scottish peers were entitled to sit in the ancient Parliament of Scotland. After the Union, the peers of the old Parliament of Scotland elected 16 Scottish representative peers to sit in the House of Lords at Westminster. The Peerage Act 1963 granted all Scottish peers the right to sit in the House of Lords. However, thirty six years later, this automatic right was revoked, as for all hereditary peerages (except those of the incumbent Earl Marshal and Lord Great Chamberlain), when the House of Lords Act 1999 received royal assent.

Unlike English and Welsh peerages, many Scottish titles have been granted with remainder to pass via female offspring (thus an Italian family has succeeded to and presently holds the earldom of Newburgh), and in the case of daughters only, these titles devolve to the eldest daughter rather than falling into abeyance (as is the case with ancient English baronies by writ of summons). Unlike other British peerage titles, Scots law permits peerages to be inherited by or through a person who was not legitimate at birth, but was subsequently legitimised by their parents marrying later.

The ranks of the Scottish peerage are, in ascending order: Lord of Parliament, Viscount, Earl, Marquess and Duke. Scottish viscounts differ from those of the other divisions of peerage (of England, Great Britain, Ireland and the United Kingdom) by using the style of in their title, as in Viscount of Oxfuird. Though this is the theoretical form, most viscounts drop the "of". The Viscount of Arbuthnott and to a lesser extent the Viscount of Oxfuird still use "of".

The Scottish peerage differs from those of England and Ireland in that its lowest rank is not that of baron. In Scotland, "baron" is a rank within the Baronage of Scotland, considered noble but not a peer, equivalent to a baron in some continental countries. The Scottish equivalent to the English or Irish baron is a lord of Parliament. Barons in Scotland were historically feudal barons until 2004, when a change in Scottish law abolished the feudal system. This reform "expressly preserves the dignity of baron... and any other dignity or office, whether or not of feudal origin," converting feudal titles into non-territorial dignities - personal titles no longer attached to the land, including the quality, precedence, and heraldic rights pertaining.

== List of peerages ==
In the following table of the Peerage of Scotland as it currently stands, each peer's highest ranking title in the other peerages (if any) are also listed. Those peers who are known by a higher title in one of the other peerages are listed in italics.

=== Extant dukedoms ===
- Subsidiary title.
- Secondary dukedom in the Peerage of Scotland

#	Shield	Title	Creation	Other Dukedom or higher titles	Title used in the House of Lords prior to the Peerage Act 1963	Monarch
1		Duke of Rothesay	1398	Since 1603, usually Prince of Wales as the heir to the throne Duke of Cornwall (England).		King Robert III
2		Duke of Hamilton	12 September 1643		(Kingdom of Great Britain) Duke of Brandon	King Charles I
3		Duke of Buccleuch	20 April 1663		(Kingdom of England) Earl of Doncaster	King Charles II
4		Duke of Lennox	9 September 1675	Duke of Richmond (England)		King Charles II
—		Duke of Queensberry	3 February 1684	Duke of Buccleuch (Scotland)		King Charles II
5		Duke of Argyll	23 June 1701		(United Kingdom) Duke of Argyll (Kingdom of Great Britain) Baron Sundridge (Kingdom of Great Britain) Baron Hamilton of Hameldon	King William III and II
6		Duke of Atholl	30 January 1703		(Kingdom of Great Britain) Earl Strange (1786–1957)	Queen Anne
7		Duke of Montrose	24 April 1707		(Kingdom of Great Britain) Earl Graham	Queen Anne
8		Duke of Roxburghe	25 April 1707		(United Kingdom) Earl Innes	Queen Anne

=== Extant marquessates ===
#	Shield	Title	Creation	Other Marquessate or higher titles	Title used in the House of Lords prior to the Peerage Act 1963	Monarch
1		Marquess of Huntly	17 April 1599		(United Kingdom) Baron Meldrum	King James VI and I
2		Marquess of Queensberry	11 February 1682			King Charles II
3		Marquess of Tweeddale	17 December 1694		(United Kingdom) Baron Tweeddale	King William III and II
4		Marquess of Lothian	23 June 1701		(United Kingdom) Baron Ker of Kersehugh	King William III and II

=== Extant earldoms ===
- Secondary earldom in the Peerage of Scotland.

#	Shield	Title	Creation	Other Earldom or higher titles	Title used in the House of Lords prior to the Peerage Act 1963	Monarch
1		Earl of Sutherland	1230	Between 1839 and 1963 the Earls of Sutherland were also titled Duke of Sutherland in the Peerage of the United Kingdom with an automatic seat in the House of Lords.		King Alexander II
2		Earl of Crawford	21 April 1398		(United Kingdom) Baron Wigan	King Robert II
3		Earl of Mar	1404			King Robert III
4		Earl of Erroll	12 June 1452			King James II
5		Earl of Caithness	28 August 1455			King James II
6		Earl of Rothes	20 March 1457			King James II
7		Earl of Morton	14 Mar 1458			King James II
8		Earl of Buchan	1469		(United Kingdom) Baron Erskine	King James III
9		Earl of Eglinton	3 January 1507		(United Kingdom) Earl of Winton	King James III
9		Earl of Eglinton	3 January 1507		(United Kingdom) Baron Ardrossan	King James IV
10		Earl of Moray	30 January 1562		(Kingdom of Great Britain) Baron Stuart	Queen Mary I
11		Earl of Mar	22 July 1565			Queen Mary I
12		Earl of Home	4 March 1605		(United Kingdom) Baron Douglas	King James VI and I
13		Earl of Perth	4 March 1605			King James VI and I
14		Earl of Strathmore and Kinghorne	10 July 1606		(United Kingdom) Earl of Strathmore and Kinghorne (United Kingdom) Baron Bowes	King James VI and I
15		Earl of Haddington	20 March 1619			King James VI and I
—		Earl of Kellie	12 March 1619	Earl of Mar (1565) (Scotland)		King James VI and I
16		Earl of Galloway	19 September 1623		(Kingdom of Great Britain) Baron Stewart of Garlies	King James VI and I
17		Earl of Lauderdale	14 March 1624			King James VI and I
18		Earl of Lindsay	8 May 1633			King Charles I
19		Earl of Loudoun	12 May 1633			King Charles I
20		Earl of Kinnoull	25 May 1633		(Kingdom of Great Britain) Baron Hay of Pedwardine	King Charles I
21		Earl of Elgin	21 June 1633		(United Kingdom) Baron Elgin	King Charles I
22		Earl of Wemyss	25 June 1633		(United Kingdom) Baron Wemyss	King Charles I
23		Earl of Dalhousie	29 June 1633		(United Kingdom) Baron Ramsay	King Charles I
24		Earl of Airlie	2 April 1639			King Charles I
25		Earl of Leven	11 October 1641			King Charles I
26		Earl of Dysart	3 August 1643			King Charles I
27		Earl of Selkirk	4 August 1646			King Charles I
28		Earl of Northesk	1 November 1647			King Charles I
—		Earl of Kincardine	26 December 1647	Earl of Elgin (Scotland)		King Charles I
—		Earl of Balcarres	9 January 1651	Earl of Crawford (Scotland)		King Charles II
29		Earl of Dundee	8 September 1660		(United Kingdom) Baron Glassary	King Charles II
30		Earl of Newburgh	31 December 1660			King Charles II
31		Earl of Annandale and Hartfell	23 April 1662			King Charles II
32		Earl of Dundonald	12 May 1669			King Charles II
33		Earl of Kintore	20 June 1677		(United Kingdom) Viscount Stonehaven (United Kingdom) Baron Stonehaven	King Charles II
34		Earl of Dunmore	16 August 1686			King James VII and II
—		Earl of Melville	8 April 1690	Earl of Leven (Scotland)		King William II and III
35		Earl of Orkney	3 January 1696			King William II and III
—		Earl of March	20 April 1697	Earl of Wemyss (Scotland)		King William II and III
36		Earl of Seafield	24 June 1701			King William II and III
37		Earl of Stair	8 April 1703		(United Kingdom) Baron Oxenfoord	Queen Anne
38		Earl of Rosebery	10 April 1703		(United Kingdom) Earl of Midlothian (United Kingdom) Baron Rosebery	Queen Anne
39		Earl of Glasgow	12 April 1703		(United Kingdom) Baron Fairlie	Queen Anne

=== Extant viscountcies ===
#	Shield	Title	Creation	Other Viscountcy or higher titles	Monarch
1		Viscount Falkland	10 November 1620		King James VI and I
2		Viscount of Arbuthnott	16 November 1641		King Charles I
3		Viscount of Oxfuird	19 April 1651		King Charles II

=== Extant lordships of Parliament ===
- Subsidiary title.

#	Shield	Title	Creation	Other Lordship or higher titles	Monarch
1		Lord Forbes	1442		King James III
2		Lord Gray	1445		King James III
3		Lord Saltoun	1445		King James III
4		Lord Sinclair	1449		King James III
5		Lord Borthwick	1452		King James III
6		Lord Lovat	1464	(United Kingdom) Baron Lovat	King James III
7		Lord Sempill	1488		King James IV
8		Lord Herries	1490		King James IV
9		Lord Elphinstone	14 January 1510	(United Kingdom) Baron Elphinstone	King James IV
10		Lord Torphichen	24 January 1564		Queen Mary I
11		Lord Kinloss	2 February 1602		King James VI and I
12		Lord Balfour of Burleigh	16 July 1607		King James VI and I
13		Lord Dingwall	8 June 1609	Baron Lucas (England)	King James VI and I
14		Lord Napier	4 May 1627	(United Kingdom) Baron Ettrick	King Charles I
15		Lord Fairfax of Cameron	18 October 1627		King Charles I
16		Lord Reay	20 June 1628		King Charles I
17		Lord Elibank	18 March 1643		King Charles I
18		Lord Belhaven and Stenton	15 December 1647		King Charles I
19		Lord Rollo	10 January 1651	(United Kingdom) Baron Dunning	King Charles II
20		Lord Polwarth	26 December 1690		King William II and III

== See also ==
- The Scots Peerage, nine-volume book series
- Barons in Scotland
- Noblesse
- Peerage of England
- Welsh peers and baronets
- Peerage of Ireland
- History of the Peerage
