= Holy Deadlock =

1934 novel

- First edition
- Author: A. P. Herbert
- Language: English
- Genre: Satire/Polemic
- Publisher: Methuen
- Publication date: 1934
- Publication place: United Kingdom
- Media type: Print
- Pages: 311p.

Holy Deadlock is a 1934 satirical novel by the English author A. P. Herbert, which aimed to highlight the perceived inadequacies and absurdities of contemporary divorce law. The book took a particularly lenient view of the need for divorces, which it characterised as "a relief from misfortune, not a crime", and demonstrated how the current system created an environment which encouraged the participants to commit perjury and adultery. The book was a major element in the popular debate about the liberalisation of divorce law in the mid-1930s, and helped pave the way for the 1937 statutory reforms.

== Background ==
In the 1920s and 1930s, English law did not allow for divorce by mutual consent, but rather required proof of adultery, or violence by one party; misconduct by both parties could lead to the divorce being refused. Divorce was seen as a remedy for the innocent against the guilty. So this had the weird consequence, castigated in the book, that if one spouse had committed adultery, they could be divorced, but if both had, they couldn't – unless the court chose to exercise its discretion. That discretion was itself covered by peculiar rules of its own. To add a further hurdle, the law strictly prohibited "collusion" by the parties. This could extend to any sort of negotiation between them. An official—the King's Proctor—was charged with seeking out any evidence of the parties working together to secure a divorce.

Many couples of the time chose to petition on the grounds of adultery, even when no adultery had been committed. In this situation, a popular solution was what was known as "hotel evidence": the man and an uninvolved woman would travel to a seaside resort for a weekend, and go around publicly and ostentatiously as husband and wife. In the morning, they would take great care to be observed by the chambermaid in bed together when she brought in their breakfast. The pair would return home, and when the case came to court the maid would be called on to give evidence as a witness to this fictitious "adultery". After the trial, there would then be a six-month waiting period until the decree nisi granted at the trial was made absolute, and any misconduct by the "innocent" party in this time—or any evidence of collusion coming to light—could annul the divorce.

In effect, to secure an amicable divorce, one or both of the couple would have to commit perjury several times over—and potentially be liable for criminal penalties in so doing. Whilst the courts would often turn a blind eye to it, this was by no means guaranteed, and a system which virtually mandated perjury was felt by many to be scandalous.

== Origins ==
Divorce law reform had long been one of Herbert's "small causes", for which he agitated in the pages of Punch. His first attempt to bring this particular cause to a broader audience was a play, The White Witch (1924), concerning a couple in a divorce suit who both protest that they had not committed adultery. The play was a failure, and closed after six weeks; Herbert felt that the "fatal" problem had been that "nobody made love" in the play. Arnold Bennett wrote that he was "very disappointed indeed" by it, and E. V. Lucas wrote that he loathed "adultery discussions in public. The theatre ... should be jollier than that".

Herbert had written three novels, with varying degrees of success. The Secret Battle (1919), a critically acclaimed war novel, sold poorly on its original publication but was republished in 1930, and went through five subsequent editions. The House by the River (1920) was a little-noted crime novel, which began to introduce elements of comedy into a tragic storyline. The Water Gipsies (1930), a story about canal life, was a broad success, which went on to sell a quarter of a million copies and attract comparison to the works of Charles Dickens. By 1932, he was contemplating a fourth novel to capitalise on this last success; his editor at Punch, E. V. Knox, encouraged him to put aside his theatrical work to focus on writing it.

He chose to make another attempt at writing on the theme of divorce reform. During a sailing holiday around Brittany with Sir Edward Spears and his wife Mary Borden in late 1932, he filled a notebook with the outline of what was to become Holy Deadlock.

Before the novel was published, however, he took up the theme in one of his Misleading Cases, "Not a Crime". This was first published in Still More Misleading Cases (1933), and unusually does not seem to have been published in Punch beforehand. In this, he presented an innocent couple, married in haste during the First World War, who wished to divorce. The reader was told that after a farcical series of events had spun the case out, the decree nisi was refused because the wife (the petitioner) had been unfaithful after the trial, at which point the husband announced that he was fed up with the whole business and, as a party who was actually innocent, would it be possible for him to divorce his wife rather than the other way around? This led to a certain quandary: "Either Mr. Pale has committed misconduct, in which case the couple cannot be divorced, or he has not committed misconduct, in which case he can be sent to prison for pretending that he has". In this case, Herbert was able to let his judge give the "right" answer to the dilemma: he declared that the marriage was dissolved upon the suit of both parties, with no guilt attaching to either, and gave a two-page conclusion in which he decried the law as "illogical, cruel, barbarous and disgusting".

== Plot summary ==
Pardon me, Mr. Adam, but have either of you committed adultery? We are not here, Mr. Adam, to secure your happiness, but to preserve the institution of marriage and the purity of the home. And therefore one of you must commit adultery ... someone has to behave impurely in order to uphold the Christian idea of purity, someone has to confess in public to a sinful breach of the marriage vows in order that the happily married may point at him or her and feel themselves secure and virtuous.

The novel's plot is very similar to that of "Not a Crime", expanded and presented with a tragic ending rather than the earlier deus ex machina. The protagonists are a faultless and honest young couple, with the everyman names of John Adam and Mary Eve, who married impetuously, are now amicably separated, and wish to divorce so that they can remarry; neither has committed adultery nor desired to. Because of the lack of legal provision, they are compelled to collude to present a fictional cause for divorce; Mary asks Adam to "act like a gentleman" and provide the pretext, as her fiancé, Martin Seal, cannot be named as a co-respondent without risking his job (he works as an announcer for the BBC). After his first attempt to obtain the necessary evidence, the maid refuses to identify him in court and the case collapses; at the second attempt, his "partner" develops measles and has to be supported in the hotel for several weeks at great expense. A decree nisi is granted but, during the waiting period, Mary spends the night with Seal and is reported by an acquaintance to the King's Proctor, who reports that the divorce should not be granted. She fights the case, but the judge refuses to exercise any discretion in her favour, and declines to grant a divorce. By the end of the book, Mary and Adam are separated but remain legally married. Seal has lost his position after being named in the final court case, but can choose to live with Mary without excessive social stigma. However, John is a broken man, legally unable to marry his lover—and, as she is a school headmistress, socially unable to continue associating with her. On the last page, he departs in the company of a prostitute, announcing that he intends to "behave like a gentleman—at last!"

"Queer thing," said Mr. Boom after his seventh oyster. "Just an ordinary English collusive divorce case—thousands like them every year. And all goes well until people start telling the truth. Your part of it—the part that was all lies from beginning to end—oh, yes, I know—isn't questioned at all."

== Reaction ==
The book sold more than ninety thousand copies, and was selected by the Book of the Month Club in the United States. It was widely discussed at the time, and was a "sensation on both sides of the Atlantic". It has been compared to Evelyn Waugh's A Handful of Dust, which also described a wealthy couple colluding to obtain a divorce, although the two were very different in tone.

Public reaction was widespread, with Herbert receiving a vast amount of correspondence, much of it under the belief that he himself was unhappily married. Rudyard Kipling summarised much of the reaction when he wrote that the book made him "...sick. I knew things were pretty heathen in that department... but I didn't realise they were worse than heathen". The novel has been noted as a major step in influencing public opinion to support a liberalisation of the divorce laws, though Herbert himself would claim that it merely "helped to create a more favourable attitude".

From a legal standpoint, it has been seen as a "classically excellent" example of how to provide complex legal exposition through fiction, and at one point was used as a textbook; a legal reviewer described it as "a singularly accurate presentation of the law [and] an admirable picture of divorce practice in England". As well as the facts of the law, the novel detailed the practical intricacies which were routinely used to get around it, and highlighted the absurdity and human costs of the existing situation.

However, it focused almost entirely on the legal aspects; the broader social issues were not discussed, and the opponents of reform portrayed as "only self-righteous bigots and nice old clergymen incapable of reason". The lawyers were shown as disinterested and well-informed figures who would tirelessly pursue what they saw as their client's best interests, whilst the protagonists themselves were "sacrificed ... to the sociology, but they do it with a good grace".

The political overtones of the "frankly polemical attack" were noted, and a shortly after publication a question was raised in the House of Commons by Frederick Macquisten, who felt that, as a result of the book, "His Majesty's judges and courts, and the legal code which they administer in matrimonial causes, are held up to public ridicule and contempt"; the Attorney-General declined to pursue the matter.

== Later developments ==
Malavika Rajkotia writes that "This novel sparked off the first divorce law reform movement in England, which led to the passing of the Matrimonial Causes Act 1937". Herbert continued his campaign after the publication of the book, with significant success. In 1935, he was elected to the House of Commons as an Independent Member of Parliament for Oxford University, and in his maiden speech vowed to introduce a private bill to reform divorce law. This Bill was eventually introduced in 1936, and became law as the Matrimonial Causes Act 1937, a process described in his book The Ayes Have It.

It was reported in 1939 that a film of the book was planned for the following year, but it never appeared. Herbert, who had written the treatment, believed that it was vetoed by the film censor because "that official has always been a Catholic".

Herbert would return to the theme of matrimonial law reform—in this case, the remarriage of divorcees—in his novel Made for Man (1957).
