= A. P. Herbert =

English politician and novelist (1890–1971)

Sir A. P. Herbert CH
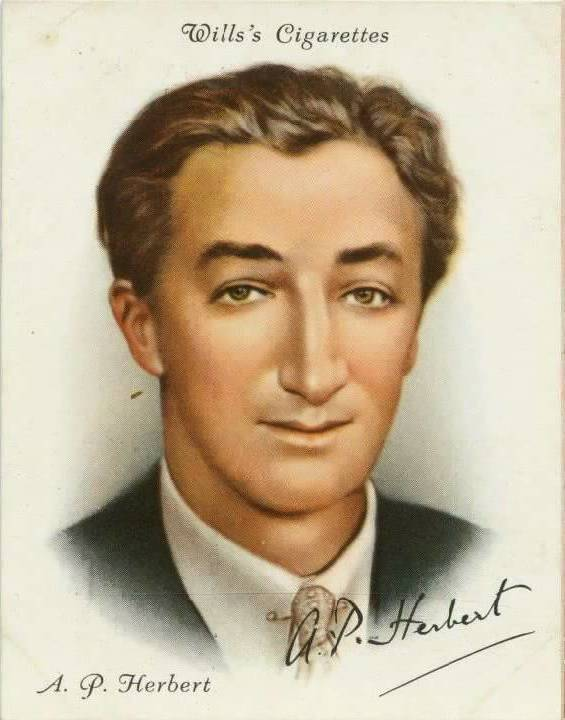
- Herbert in a 1910s illustration

Member of Parliament for Oxford University
- In office 14 November 1935 – 23 February 1950 Serving with Lord Hugh Cecil (1910–1937); Sir Arthur Salter (1937–1950)
- Preceded by: Sir Charles Oman
- Succeeded by: Constituency abolished

Personal details
- Born: Alan Patrick Herbert; 24 September 1890 Ashtead, Surrey, England
- Died: 11 November 1971 (aged 81) London, England
- Party: Independent
- Spouse(s): Gwendolyn, Lady Herbert, née Quilter (m. 1915)
- Children: 4, including Jocelyn Herbert
- Relatives: Sir Charles Jasper Selwyn (grandfather)
- Education: Winchester College
- Alma mater: New College, Oxford

Military service
- Allegiance: United Kingdom
- Branch/service: Royal Navy; 63rd (Royal Naval) Division; Naval Intelligence Division
- Years of service: 1914–1918; 1939–1945
- Rank: Sub-Lieutenant (WWI); Petty Officer (WWII)
- Unit: Royal Naval Division; Royal Naval Auxiliary Patrol
- Commands: Water Gipsy
- Battles/wars: World War I; Gallipoli campaign; Battle of the Somme; World War II
- Writing career
- Genres: Comedy, satire, war, crime thriller, drama, light opera, musical theatre, poetry
- Notable works: The Secret Battle (1919); The House by the River (1921); Uncommon Law (1935)

Sir Alan Patrick Herbert CH (known as A. P. Herbert; 24 September 1890 – 11 November 1971), was an English humorist, novelist, playwright, law reformist, and, from 1935 to 1950, an independent Member of Parliament for Oxford University.

Born in Ashtead, Surrey, he attended Winchester College and New College, Oxford, receiving a starred first in jurisprudence in 1914. He joined the Royal Naval Volunteer Reserve as a seaman in the First World War, becoming an officer in the Royal Naval Division. He fought in Gallipoli and on the Western Front, as a battalion adjutant in 1917, before injury removed him from the front line. After the war he published The Secret Battle and in 1924 joined the staff of Punch. As an MP he campaigned for private-member rights, piloted the Matrimonial Causes Act 1937 through Parliament, opposed Entertainments Duty and campaigned against the Oxford Group. He joined the River Emergency Service in 1938, captaining a boat on the River Thames in the Second World War as a petty officer in the Royal Naval Auxiliary Patrol. In 1943, he joined a parliamentary commission on the future of the Dominion of Newfoundland.

== Early life and education ==
Herbert was born at Ashtead Lodge, Ashtead, Surrey, on 24 September 1890. His father, Patrick Herbert Coghlan Herbert (1849–1915), was a civil servant (assistant secretary of the Judicial and Public Department) in the India Office, of Irish origin, and his mother, Beatrice Eugenie (née Selwyn), was the daughter of Sir Charles Jasper Selwyn, a Lord Justice of Appeal. His two younger brothers both died in battle: Owen William Eugene, Second lieutenant, Royal Field Artillery, killed at Mons in 1914, and Sidney Jasper, Captain R.N., killed 1941 aboard HMS Hood. His mother died of tuberculosis when he was eight, shortly before he left for The Grange in Folkestone, a preparatory school.

Herbert then attended Winchester College, winning the King's Medal for English Verse and the King's Medal for English Speech, presented by Prime Minister H. H. Asquith. He took an active part in the college debating and Shakespeare societies. As a Winchester student, Herbert sent verses to the offices of Punch and received notes of encouragement and suggestions from the editor, Owen Seaman. Herbert was also Captain of Houses, one of the college's three football divisions.

Herbert went to New College, Oxford as an exhibitioner. He made his first public speech at the Kensington branch of the Tariff Reform League, speaking extempore on home rule. His first contribution to Punch was printed on 24 August 1910: a set of verses entitled "Stones of Venus". He went up to Oxford in October and made his first speech at the Oxford Union in November. His work began appearing not only in Punch, but in The Observer, the Pall Mall Gazette and Vanity Fair.

Herbert received a "not very good Second" in Honour Moderations, and apparently disenchanted with Classics, changed his degree to Law. He went into lodgings with Walter Monckton and others and was good friends with the notables Duff Cooper, Harold Macmillan and Philip Guedalla. Herbert finished at Oxford in 1914 with "a very good First" in Jurisprudence. He then decided to join his friend Jack Parr as a volunteer at Oxford House in Bethnal Green for a year. He spent the time "doing what I could:" washing dishes, sweeping floors, running errands and collecting money.

== First World War service, 1914–1918 ==
On 5 September 1914, Herbert enlisted at Lambeth Pier as an ordinary seaman in the Royal Naval Volunteer Reserve, which later became one of the constituent bodies of the Royal Naval Division. In early October, news reached him that his brother, Owen Herbert, had been posted "missing, believed killed" in the retreat from Mons. Herbert reached the rank of acting leading seaman before being commissioned as a sub-lieutenant in early 1915, when he was posted to Hawke Battalion of the Royal Naval Division (later to come under army command as part of the 63rd (Royal Naval) Division).

"C" and "D" companies of the Hawke Battalion left for Gallipoli in early 1915, briefly stopping in Malta before arriving at the Moudros on 17 May, and finally reaching Gallipoli on 27 May. Herbert took command of No. 11 Platoon, "C" Company, composed mostly of Tynesiders and also two men from a remote Durham mining town. A week after his arrival, the battalion suffered heavy casualties at the Third Battle of Krithia. In July 1915, Herbert went down with illness and had to spend time recovering in a military hospital. When he was passed "fit for light duty", he was seconded to the Naval Intelligence Division at Whitehall. It was then that he decided to rent No. 12 Hammersmith Terrace as a dwelling.

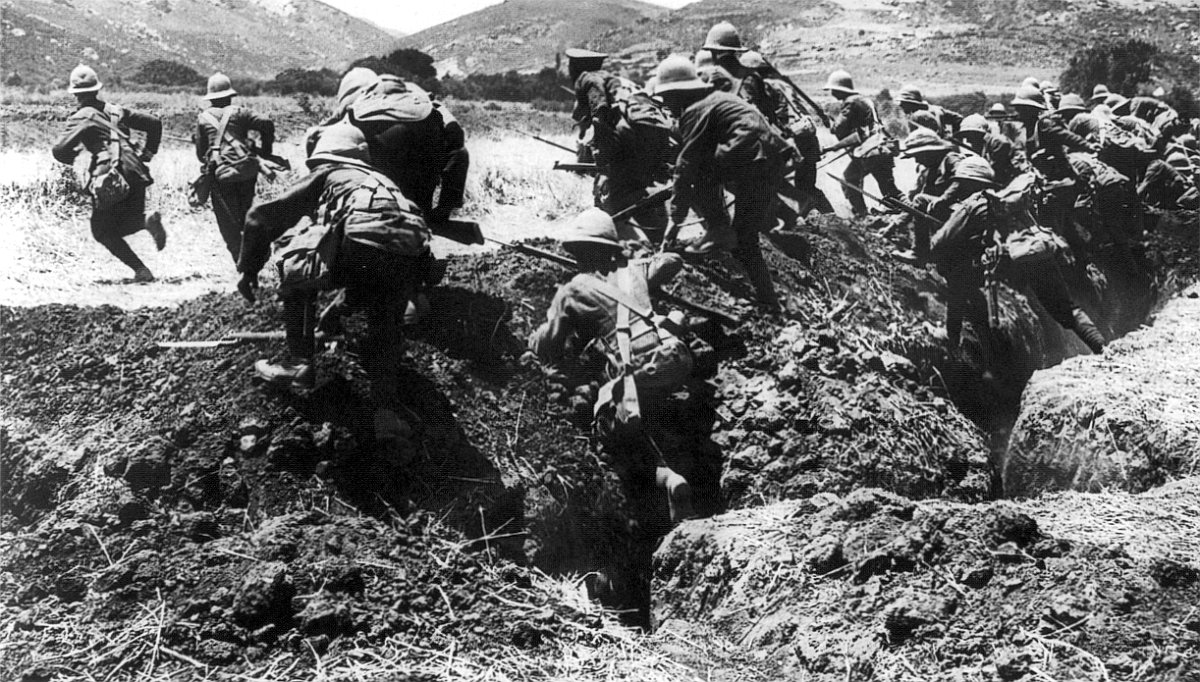
Soldiers of the Royal Naval Division training to leave a trench during Gallipoli, 1915

In summer 1916, when he was passed fit for duty, Herbert returned to Hawke Battalion at their base camp in Abbeville, where he was made assistant adjutant. The battalion moved to the front line at Souchez in July 1916, and in mid-November it took part in an attack on Beaucourt-sur-l'Ancre during the Battle of the Ancre, which saw almost the entire battalion wiped out. Herbert was one of only two officers to come out unscathed from the attack. When the battalion returned to the front line at Pozières in February 1917, Herbert was made the battalion's adjutant, but he was later injured from shrapnel during an attack on Gavrelle, west of Arras.

On medical leave back in England after the injury, Herbert began writing his first book, The Secret Battle, which he finished "in a few weeks". He was elected a member of the Savage Club and raised by Punch to the "exclusive group of its contributors who were allowed to attach their initials to their work." On 2 October 1918, Herbert sailed from Liverpool in a convoy for Alexandria, as assistant to the Commodore. After arriving at Port Said, he was given a free pass to Cairo and allowed to make a number of unaccompanied incursions inland. He was able to visit several places on the North African coast, and from Tunis took a train to Constantine, Algeria and then to Algiers. On 11 November, he went by train from Oran to Tlemcen. Exactly at 11 am, he heard that the Armistice had been signed. As he wrote, "I must have been the only Englishman for at least 80 miles."

Herbert was granted shore leave at Gibraltar and took the chance to travel to Seville, then to Córdoba. He arrived in Madrid on 22 November and dined with the Embassy's naval attaché, Captain John Harvey, as well as Filson Young and others, before making the return journey to Gibraltar.

== Interwar career, 1918–1935 ==
The Secret Battle was recommended to Methuen Publishing by E. V. Lucas and announced in their spring list in 1919. It was "read all night" by Prime Minister Lloyd George, who brought it to the attention of Churchill, then Secretary of State for War. Montgomery saw it as "the best story of front line war" and Herbert himself believed that court-martial arrangements were subsequently "altered in some way" as a result of the book. However, the book had no great commercial success, which his biographer Reginald Pound puts down to the fact that "Readers, it seems, were tired of war as a dramatic theme."

Herbert was called to the Bar by Inner Temple in 1919 and entered the chambers of Leslie Scott. He was joined by two Oxford friends, Walter Monckton and Henry Strauss, who were called on the same day. Although he spent time at Inner Temple, he never practised law and did not enter a legal career. He later said he was "forever sorry" not to be "of the proud and faithful brotherhood who serve the laws of England."

Unable to sustain himself on Punch's "eccentric rates of payment", Herbert wrote his second book, The House by the River, in two months. It was published in 1920. He handed his literary business to A. P. Watt, who sold the American rights to The House by the River and published a collection of his prose submissions to Punch under the title Light Articles Only.

In January 1924, Owen Seaman, the editor of Punch, invited Herbert to join its staff. Herbert accepted and his accession meant he would receive a salary of £50 a week. In 1925, Herbert attended the Third Imperial Press Conference on behalf of Punch, where he made his first speech in front of a large audience in Melbourne, where it was described as "delectably witty" by Sir Harry Brittain.

In 1926, Herbert was invited by Nigel Playfair to write "an entertainment" for the Lyric Theatre, Hammersmith. The result was Riverside Nights, performed at the Lyric in April 1926. His next play, The White Witch, was performed at Haymarket Theatre in September 1926.

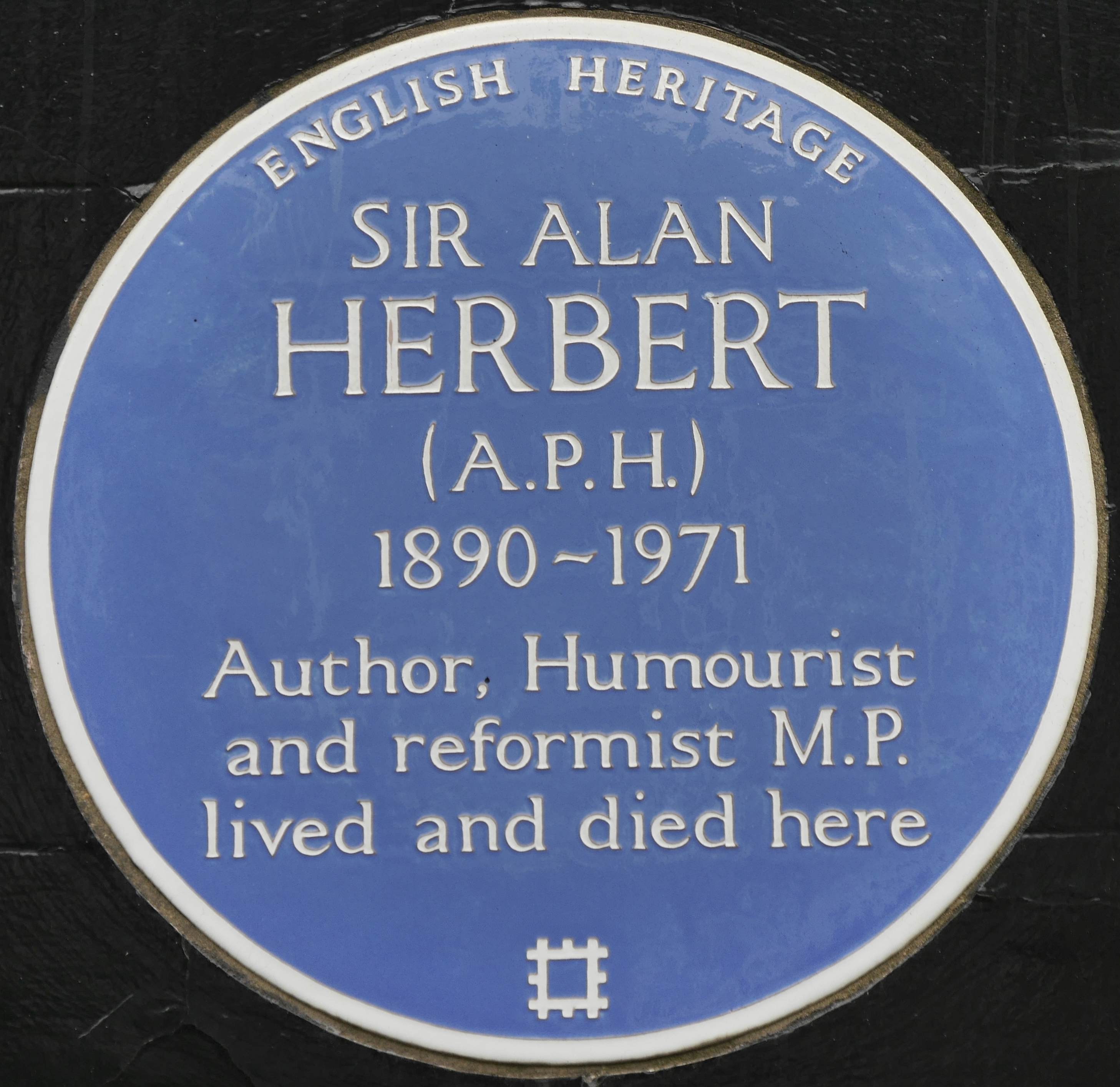
Blue plaque, 12 Hammersmith Terrace

== Early parliamentary career, 1935–1939 ==
Herbert first encountered Parliament in 1934, when he brought the Kitchen Committee of the House of Commons to court for selling liquor without a licence. Hewart, LCJ ruled that the court would not hear the complaint because the matter fell within parliamentary privilege. Since the decision was never challenged in a higher court, it led to a unique situation of uncertainty as to "the extent to which statute law applies to either House of Parliament." The following year Herbert published Uncommon Law, and Hewart contributed a generous introduction.

Herbert first had the idea of standing for Parliament a few weeks before the 1935 general election, when he ran into Frederick Lindemann, who had just been rejected as Conservative candidate for Oxford University. Herbert decided to stand as an independent, aided by Frank Pakenham as his election agent. Herbert wrote an "unconventional" 5,000-word election address, which included the statement, "Agriculture: I know nothing about agriculture."

Herbert was elected as an independent supporter of the National Government. Defying the advice of more experienced members, including Austen Chamberlain, he made his maiden speech on 4 December 1935, the second day of the opening session of the new Parliament. He protested to Prime Minister Stanley Baldwin on a motion that would give precedence to government bills over private member's bills. He went into the "No" lobby alongside the members of the Independent Labour Party and fellow University member Eleanor Rathbone, but the motion was passed by 232 to 5. Churchill praised Herbert for his "composure and aplomb" and famously said: "Call that a maiden speech? It was a brazen hussy of a speech. Never did such a painted lady of a speech parade itself before a modest Parliament." During the speech, Herbert promised to introduce his Matrimonial Causes Bill into law by the end of the Parliament.

Herbert's novel Holy Deadlock (1934) deals at length with the inconsistencies of English divorce law. Malavika Rajkotia writes that "This novel sparked off the first divorce law reform movement in England, which led to the passing of the Matrimonial Causes Act 1937". In 1936, Herbert failed to be drawn in the private members' ballot but managed to get the Conservative Rupert De la Bère to sponsor the bill. On 20 November, Herbert made a speech in its favour and it passed its second reading by 78 votes to 12. It was given a third reading in the House of Lords on 19 July 1937 and passed by 79 votes to 28. It was passed, somewhat strengthened by the House of Lords, in 1938 as the Matrimonial Causes Act 1937. It allowed divorce to be given without requiring proof of adultery, but fake adulteries and bizarre rules about collusion persisted until the Divorce Reform Act 1969 came into force in 1971.

During the prewar period, Herbert drafted a number of bills that were printed on the Order Paper, including a Betting and Bookmakers Bill, a Public Refreshment Bill and a Spring (Arrangements) Bill, which was written in verse. Herbert made numerous attacks on the Entertainments Duty, which had been introduced as a "temporary, war-time tax" in 1916. In his campaign against the duty, Herbert worked closely with William Mabane, and they made some headway when in 1939 the Chancellor of the Exchequer Sir John Simon reduced the duty. Herbert also spoke out against the proposed Population (Statistics) Bill in 1937 by making a speech that was received with "loud laughter" in the Commons chamber, making it, according to Punch, "an astonishing occasion". Herbert and others brought in several amendments to the bill before it reached the statute book in 1938.

Herbert was also a fervent opponent of the Oxford Group and its leader, Frank Buchman. In particular, he opposed the use of "Oxford" in its name and its supposed association with the University of Oxford. He was supported by the university in his endeavours, particularly by the Oxford Union, which unanimously passed a resolution in support of him. Support for Herbert was also expressed by H. A. L. Fisher, the Warden of New College, Oxford, and Douglas Veale, the Registrar of the University of Oxford.

== Second World War service, 1939–1945 ==
On 3 November 1938, Herbert enrolled himself and his boat, the Water Gipsy, in the River Emergency Service, which was under the control of the Port of London Authority. Over the summer of 1939, he took part in exercises involving simulated air raids and casualty retrieval. In early September 1939, the River Emergency Service reported to its war stations. Herbert's crew consisted of Darcy Braddell, vice-president of the Royal Institute of British Architects, Victor Pasmore, Magnus Pyke and John Pudney. At the sounding of the first air-raid siren in London in 1939, the Water Gipsy was anchored off the Speaker's Steps by Westminster Bridge. A number of MPs left the Commons following the sirens and, recognising the Water Gipsy as the only naval vessel in sight, cheered and saluted it.

During the Second World War, Herbert was the only non-commissioned officer in the House of Commons, and he wore his uniform on any and every occasion during the war. He turned down efforts to persuade him to apply for a commission, although he once appeared before a selection board against his will. He also turned down the offer of a role in Churchill's war cabinet when asked by saying, "No, thank you, sir. I'm quite happy where I am."

Herbert was sent to Newfoundland and Labrador in 1943 with Derrick Gunston and Charles Ammon as members of a parliamentary commission to investigate the future of the dominion. Of the alternatives, he supported independence, rather than Confederation with Canada.

== Later parliamentary career, 1945–1950 ==
After his re-election in the 1945 general election on 5 July, Herbert noted of the new Parliament that "the surge of Socialism into the House of Commons was something to see." The Labour Party, under Clement Attlee, had won 393 seats and the Conservatives had won only 197. Herbert said of the newly elected Labour MPs, "Arrogance, I am sorry to say, remained. There was such a concerto of nastiness and hate and imbecile yelling, that I thanked God, many times, that I was an Independent and could be silent without disloyalty". Herbert campaigned to ensure that the newly elected MPs realised the significance of private members' time. He prepared a number of private member's bills, including ones covering betting reform, legal aid for the poor, a fairer voting system, and the abolition of decree nisi. However, he was unsuccessful in his first attempt to guarantee private members' time, which was restored later in the Parliament.

In autumn 1945, George Orwell had the essay Notes on Nationalism published in the magazine Polemic and named Herbert as one of the followers of "neo-Toryism", who were marked by a "desire not to recognise that British power and influence have declined." Herbert's biographer, Reginald Pound, noted, "APH would have rejected the Tory affiliation, though his inclinations were with the Right."

From July 1945 to 1946, Herbert worked on the libretto for Charles B. Cochran's new musical, Big Ben. It opened at the Adelphi Theatre on 17 July 1946 and was watched on its opening night by Churchill, Montgomery, Attlee and Herbert, but Cochran himself was too ill to attend. During its first three months, it took an average of £4,000 a week at the box office, but the running costs were also high, so there was no fortune in it for Cochran or for Herbert. Its run was over at the end of 1946, after 172 performances. Cochran commissioned Herbert to write another musical, Bless the Bride, which opened at the Adelphi on 26 April 1947. It ran for two-and-a-quarter years, was the source of "an accretion of cash" for Herbert, and was Cochran's most successful musical. It included the hit song "Ma Belle Marguerite".

Herbert sat on the Supreme Court Committee on Practice and Procedures, chaired by Raymond Evershed, investigating the cost of litigation. He also chaired the Literary Sub-Committee of the 1948 Summer Olympics in London, which judged the literary compositions of 29 nations in their own languages. He accepted an invitation to serve on the Council of the Festival of Britain to be held in 1951. At the time, he was already a member of the Thames Conservancy Board, a trustee of the National Maritime Museum, president of the Inland Waterways Association and a vice president of the Pedestrians' Association for Road Safety. In addition he authored a critical study of royal commissions for the Institute of Economic Affairs, which was dismissed for its "light touch". Herbert commented: "Had it included graphs and tables and been written in a heavy style it would have been accepted as a major contribution to the practice of sound administration."

Herbert was re-elected in the 1945 general election and continued as an MP until University seats were abolished in 1950 under the Representation of the People Act 1948. Herbert's last speech, on 23 November 1949, was strongly in favour of the Festival of Britain. He was knighted in 1945 in Winston Churchill's Resignation Honours. The Times noted "his individual niche in the parliamentary temple as the doughty vindicator of the private member's rights, including not least the right to legislate."

In 1951, Herbert published a memoir of his service in the House of Commons: Independent Member (Garden City, New York: Doubleday & Co., Inc., 1951). Ten years later he was the subject of a This Is Your Life TV programme in 1961, when he was surprised by Eamonn Andrews.

== Personal life ==
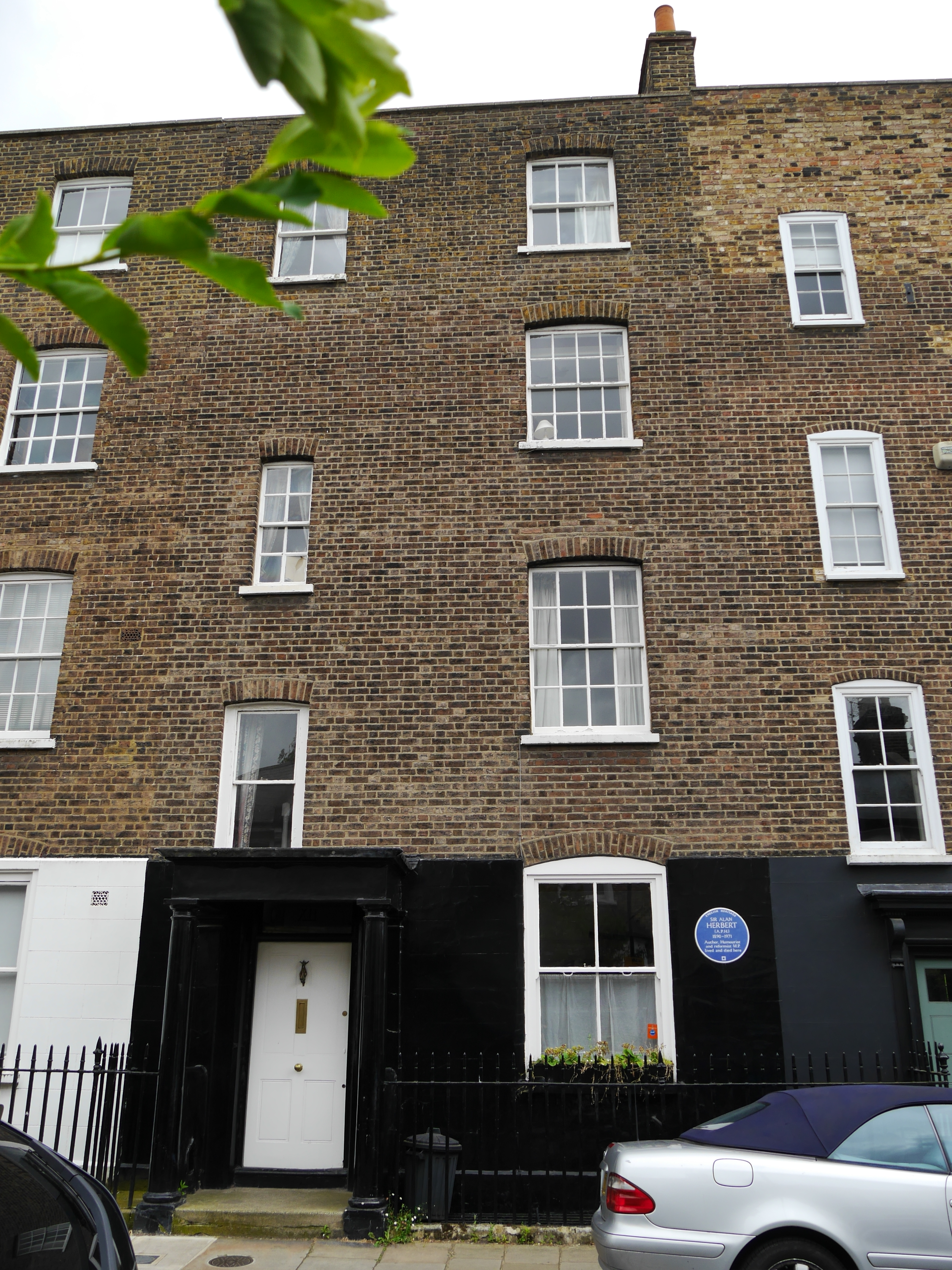
12 Hammersmith Terrace

Herbert first met his future wife, Gwendolyn Harriet Quilter, daughter of Harry Quilter, in the summer of 1914. They became engaged in December 1914 and were married in the first week of 1915 by Frederic Iremonger, Vicar of St James the Great in Bethnal Green. Herbert wore his formal dress uniform as an Acting Leading Seaman for the wedding. They spent their honeymoon in a room in Fulham Road.

Gwendolyn lived to the age of 97, dying in 1986. Lady Herbert was elected in 1966 as the first President of Hammersmith Chess Club and was a well-known face on the chess circuit. They had four children: Crystal, Lavender, Jocelyn and John.

=== The Thames ===
Herbert loved the River Thames. He lived beside it at Hammersmith, West London. He was a member of the Thames Conservancy Board and a Freeman of the Company of Watermen and Lightermen.

In 1966, he wrote a book, The Thames, in which he explored the "machinery" of the river in all its aspects.

== Death ==
In the last days of 1970, Herbert was taken to Middlesex Hospital in Fitzrovia, after a seizure that affected his left side and arm. Within six weeks, he was home again, but over many months his physical powers waned. In August 1971, he wrote his last letter to The Times, an appeal for parliamentary good manners in refraining from "witty derision of the literary exertions of Mr Harold Wilson" and of the "marine activities" of Edward Heath. By then, he was describing himself as "a recumbent nuisance".

A. P. Herbert died on 11 November 1971. Obituaries were published in The Times and in Punch. The Times accompanied its obituary notice with a leading article, saying he had done "more than any man of his day to add to the gaiety of the nation."

A memorial service on 6 December in the church of St Martin-in-the-Fields which was "crowded to overflowing". On 7 December, the Congressional Record of the US House of Representatives appeared with four pages of tributes to Herbert by congressmen from Ohio, Missouri, West Virginia and Wisconsin. Robert H. Land, chief of the Reference Department of the Library of Congress, later said that there was "[no] record or recollection of a similar tribute to another English writer in the proceedings of Congress."

== References by other authors ==
In a 1957 article entitled "Over Seventy", lamenting the decline of the humorist, P. G. Wodehouse wrote: "I want to see an A. P. Herbert on every street corner, an Alex Atkinson in every local."

The title of Alexandra Fuller's 2001 memoir Don't Let's Go to the Dogs Tonight: An African Childhood is taken from a Herbert quote, "Don't let's go to the dogs tonight, for Mother will be there."

== Misleading cases ==
Uncommon Law, collecting Misleading Cases in the Common Law

Starting in 1910, he contributed regularly to the magazine Punch. One series of his that it published was Misleading Cases in the Common Law, the work for which he is best remembered. They were satirical pieces in the form of "law reports" or "legal judgments" on various aspects of the English legal and judicial system. Even the title of the series is a humorous allusion to the entirely serious "Smith's Leading Cases".

Many of the Misleading Cases featured the exploits of Albert Haddock, a tireless and veteran litigant. One of the best-known and most colourful is Board of Inland Revenue v Haddock, also known as "The Negotiable Cow". Herbert often referred to himself as "A. P. Haddock" in skits in Punch magazine, whether or not these had a courtroom setting.

Thanks to their realism, on several occasions Herbert's satires were mistakenly reported by newspapers, both in Britain and elsewhere, as factual. One of the "cases", supposedly establishing a novel crime of "doing what you like", was sharply criticised by an American law review article, the author of which failed to note its entire absurdity.

Herbert's contributions are examples of the literary technique known as false document. Whereas in his fictitious law reports, the fictitious judges and lawyers regularly cited various real and venerable authorities, such as Henry de Bracton, they were also cited texts of Herbert's own imagining, such as "Wedderburn on Water Courses" and "A. Capone's Handbook for Bootleggers".

More importantly, the cases were Herbert's vehicles for law-reform work. Beneath their satire, they often made cogent legal or political points that tied into his personal crusades against obsolescent legislation. Although fictional, they are sometimes quoted in judicial decisions, and are also the subject of academic research.

Over his lifetime, Herbert published five collections, entitled Misleading Cases in the Common Law, More Misleading Cases, Still More Misleading Cases, Codd's Last Case and Bardot M.P.?. Stray cases also appear in his collections of miscellaneous humorous essays, such as General Cargo. Virtually all the cases were assembled into two omnibus volumes, Uncommon Law in 1935 and More Uncommon Law in 1982. A shorter selection, Wigs at Work, appeared in 1966.

The BBC successfully adapted them for television, in three series of A P Herbert's Misleading Cases (1967, 1968 and 1971), with Roy Dotrice as Haddock and Alastair Sim as Mr Justice Swallow.

== Novels and other writings ==
Herbert wrote eight novels, including The Water Gipsies (1930) and Number Nine (1951), about a post-war civil service, a weekend selection and 15 plays, including the light operas Tantivy Towers (1931) and Big Ben (1946), and the comedy Bless the Bride (1947), which ran for two-and-a-quarter years in London.

Herbert published three comic epistolary novels featuring a slangy flapper named Topsy: The Trials of Topsy (1928) Topsy, MP (1929), and Topsy Turvy (1947). They originated as letters published in Punch, and were published together in 1949 as The Topsy Omnibus, and later in a bowdlerized edition, The Voluble Topsy, 1928-1947 (2023).

In addition to his fiction, Herbert wrote What a Word! in 1935, continuing his campaign in Punch for better use of English, including a section on "Plain English", more than a decade ahead of Sir Ernest Gowers's more celebrated work. Characteristically, Herbert uses humour to make his serious points about good writing. He authored the lyrics of the patriotic song "Song of Liberty", set in 1940 to the music of Edward Elgar's Pomp and Circumstance March No. 4. In 1944, a set of posters by Eric Kennington, a personal friend, called Seeing It Through, were accompanied by Herbert poems. They describe the work of certain professionals in London in the war. After the war he wrote a booklet, "The War Story of Southend Pier", detailing when the pier was taken over by the Royal Navy in World War II.

In 1967, Herbert published Sundials Old and New; or, Fun with the Sun; a book describing in detail his long fascination with and experiments in sundial technology. In the book, he describes all manner of sundials, and recounts many of his experiments in designing and building different models, including a few that could be used to tell your position on the earth as well as the local time.

In 1970 Herbert published A.P.H., His Life and Times, dedicated to "My dear wife, for our 56th anniversary".

== Selected filmography ==
- Tell England (1931)
- Waltz Time (1933)

== Publications ==
=== General ===
- The Secret Battle, 1919, Methuen
- The House by the River, 1921, Methuen . Film: House by the River (1950)
- Little Rays of Moonshine (1921), also known as Light articles only (1922)
- The Man About Town (1923)
- The Old Flame (1925)
- Misleading Cases in the Common Law (1927)
- Honeybubble & Co. (1928)
- Tinker, tailor; a child's guide to the professions (1928)
- Topsy, M.P., 1929, Ernest Benn
- The Water Gipsies, 1930, Methuen
- No Boats on the River, 1932, Methuen
- What a Word!, 1935, Methuen
- Holy Deadlock, 1934, Methuen
- Uncommon Law, 1935, Methuen; 1969 (new edition), Methuen
- Mild and Bitter, 1936, Methuen
- The Ayes Have It: The Story of the Marriage Bill, 1937, Methuen
- Sip!: Swallow! (1938)
- General Cargo (1940)
- A Better Sky: Or, Name This Star (1944) Astronomy
- The War Story of Southend Pier, 1945, County Borough of Southend-on-Sea
- The Point of Parliament (1946)
- Topsy Turvy (1947)
- The Topsy Omnibus, 1949, Ernest Benn
- Independent Member, 1950, Methuen; republished October 1970 (ISBN 0-09-308880-9)
- Number Nine, 1951, Methuen (ISBN 978-1125619834)
- Codd's Last Case, 1952, Methuen
- Why Waterloo?, 1952, Methuen
- Made for Man, 1958, Methuen (Novel)
- Look Back and Laugh (1960)
- Bardot, M.P., 1964, Methuen
- The Thames (1966), Weidenfeld & Nicolson
- Wigs at Work, 1966
- Sundials Old and New: Or, Fun with the Sun, 1967, Methuen
- The Singing Swan: A Yachtsman's Yarn, 1968 (Novel)
- In The Dark; The Summer Time Story and The Painless Plan, 1970, The Bodley Head
- A.P.H., His Life and Times, 1970, Heinemann
- More Uncommon Law, 1982
- The voluble Topsy, with an introduction by Kate Macdonald, Bath, United Kingdom : Handheld Press, 2023, ISBN 978-1-912766-46-8

=== Drama and musicals ===
- Double Demon, an Absurdity in One Act (1926)
- The Red Pen, radio opera, music by Geoffrey Toye, BBC broadcast, 7 February 1927
- Fat King Melon and Princess Caraway: A Drama in Five Scenes (1927), music arranged by Dennis Arundell
- Derby Day: A Comic Opera in Three Acts [1931], music by Alfred Reynolds
- Tantivy Towers: A Light Opera in Three Acts (1931), music by Thomas Dunhill
- Home and Beauty, (1937) coronation revue, music by Nicholas Brodzsky, produced by C B Cochran, Adelphi Theatre
- Big Ben: A Light Opera in Two Acts (1946), music by Vivian Ellis
- Bless the Bride: A Light Opera in Two Acts (1947), music by Vivian Ellis

=== Poetry ===
- A.T.I. 'There is no need for alarm' (1944) with drawings by John Nicolson
- Play Hours with Pegasus (1912)
- Half-hours at Helles (1916)
- The Bomber Gypsy, and Other Poems (1919)
- The Wherefore and the Why; Some New Rhymes for Old Children (1921)
- Laughing Ann, and Other Poems (1925)
- Plain Jane (1927) Poems and plays in verse
- Ballads for Broadbrows (1930)
- A Book of Ballads, Being the Collected Light Verse of A. P. Herbert (1931)
- Let Us be Glum [1941]
- Siren Song (1941)
- Well, Anyhow... or Little Talks (1942)
- Bring Back the Bells (1943)
- Less Nonsense! (1944)
- Light the Lights (1945)
- Leave my Old Morale Alone (1948) Includes: Siren song / Let us be glum / Bring back the bells / Well, Anyhow... or Little Talks / Less nonsense! / Light the lights
- Full Enjoyment and Other Verses (1952)
- Silver Stream: A Beautiful Tale of Hare & Hound for Young & Old (1962)
- The Spider

== Styles ==
- 1890–1914: Mr Alan Patrick Herbert
- 1914–1914: Ordinary Seaman A. P. Herbert
- 1914–1914: Able Seaman A. P. Herbert
- 1914–1915: Acting Leading Seaman A. P. Herbert
- 1915–1918: Sub-Lieutenant A. P. Herbert RNVR
- 1918–1935: Mr A. P. Herbert
- 1935–1939: A. P. Herbert MP
- 1939–1945: Petty Officer A. P. Herbert MP
- 1945–1950: Sir A. P. Herbert MP
- 1950–1970: Sir A. P. Herbert
- 1970–1971: Sir A. P. Herbert CH

== Sources ==
- Reginald Pound (1976), A. P. Herbert: A Biography, London: Michael Joseph
- A. P. Herbert (1950), Independent Member, London: Methuen

Parliament of the United Kingdom
Preceded by Lord Hugh Cecil and Sir Charles Oman	Member of Parliament for Oxford University; 1935–1950; With: Lord Hugh Cecil, 1910–1937; Sir Arthur Salter, from 1937	University constituencies abolished
