= The Secret Battle =

1919 novel by A. P. Herbert

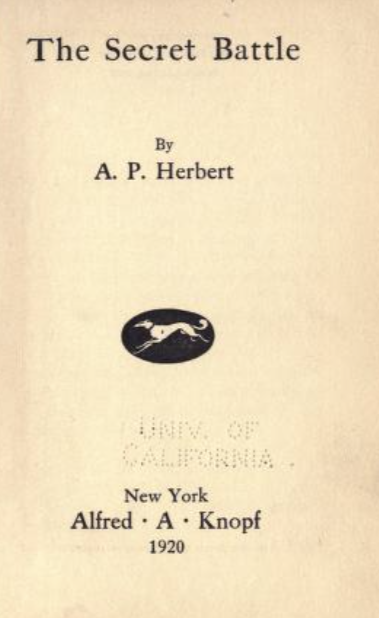
- Title page for The Secret Battle (1920)
- Author: A. P. Herbert
- Language: English
- Genre: War novel
- Publisher: Methuen
- Publication date: 1919
- Publication place: United Kingdom
- Media type: Print (hardback & paperback)

The Secret Battle is a novel by A. P. Herbert, first published in 1919. The book draws upon Herbert's experiences as a junior infantry officer in the First World War, and has been praised for its accurate and truthful portrayal of the mental effects of the war on the participants. It was one of the earliest novels to contain a detailed description of the course of the WWI Gallipoli campaign, and to challenge the Army's executions of soldiers for desertion. It is noticeable as being sharply different from Herbert's later work—there is no note of humour or lightness in the novel, simply a stark and simple narrative.

== Background ==
Herbert went up to New College, Oxford in 1910, to study law. He went down in 1914, having had several pieces of his light verse published, in Punch and elsewhere, and with the apparent intent of dabbling further in writing. In the summer of 1914 he was working at a mission in Bethnal Green; on the outbreak of war, like most of his contemporaries, he promptly joined the military. Unlike most University-educated men he did not become an officer – perhaps in response to the working-class men at the mission, who assumed that the "Oxford blokes would go off and take commissions [and] so be all right". He joined the Royal Naval Volunteer Reserve (RNVR), rather than the army – his brother Sidney, to whom he was close, was a naval officer, and he felt this might make it more likely to run into him.

The RNVR was flooded with recruits who had neither sea-training nor sea-experience, and once the fleet had mobilised fully the Navy had no real use for them. In response to a foreseen need for naval landing parties to defend Belgian ports, these men were organised into the Royal Naval Division, and equipped as infantry. Herbert was drafted into this unit, commissioned in early 1915, and sent to Gallipoli in May. He saw action at Gallipoli, was invalided home, then served with Admiralty intelligence before rejoining the division in France in 1916. It served in the last phases of the Battle of the Somme, and was virtually destroyed fighting in the capture of Beaucourt-sur-l'Ancre – of the 435 officers and men of his battalion who went into the attack, Herbert was one of only twenty to be fit for service the next day. He was later wounded, in early 1917, and returned home, where he began writing The Secret Battle. He finished the novel in "a few weeks", but put it aside and made no moves to publish it until January 1919. It may have been slightly redrafted in the intervening months – he makes a passing comparison of the court-martial to his recollections of the royal stables in Spain, a place he visited shortly after the Armistice.

== Plot summary ==
"I am going to write down some of the history of Harry Penrose, because I do not think full justice has been done to him..."

The novel follows the career of a young officer, Harry Penrose, written from the viewpoint of a close friend who acts as narrator. A sensitive, educated young man, Penrose had enlisted in the ranks in 1914, immediately after completing his second year at Oxford. After six months in training he had been prevailed upon by his relatives – like most educated volunteers – to take a commission as an officer.

Penrose slowly asserts himself; the war takes a toll on his personality, but he begins to live up to his early dreams of heroism. However, his creeping self-doubt grows by degrees; he is reassigned from his post as scouting officer once on the Somme, knowing he cannot face another night patrol, and earns the wrath of his commanding officer – an irascible Regular colonel – over a trivial incident. The colonel piles difficult, risky work on him – remarking to the narrator that "Master Penrose can go on with [leading ration parties] until he learns to do them properly" – and Penrose submits, working doggedly to try to keep from cracking. After a long period of this treatment, by the winter of 1916, Penrose's spirit is worn down; when the narrator is invalided home with an injury in February 1917, his last support is gone. He is wounded in May at Arras – a friend remarking in a letter that "you'd have said he wanted to be killed" – and they meet again in London in November. Penrose has been offered a safe job in military intelligence; he comes within a moment of taking it, but at the last minute resolves to return to France.

Returning to his battalion, he is detailed for a party to the front line by the colonel within an hour; when the narrator arrives six weeks later, he discovers Penrose is under arrest for cowardice in the face of the enemy. It transpired that each time the party advanced, it had to break for the ditches to avoid shellfire, then regroup and move further; after some time, Penrose decided to fall back and wait under cover for the shelling to halt. Seeing a dugout down the road, they make a run for it under shellfire – to find it occupied by a senior officer, himself sheltering from the shelling, who promptly reports that "he had seen the officer in charge and some of the party running down the road – demoralized" and is ordered to arrest him and return. Penrose is court-martialled on these charges, and convicted; the court's recommendation for mercy is ignored, and he is shot one morning, a week later, by a party of men from his own company.

Penrose is presented in a glowing light throughout – "never anything but modest and dutiful; he always tries his best to do his bit" – but, ultimately, is failed by the system. He faces his trial honestly, without pleading circumstances ("The real charge was that I'd lost my nerve – and I had. And I didn't want to wangle out of it like that") but it is clear that whilst he is strictly guilty of the charge ("on the only facts they had succeeded in discovering it could hardly have been anything else") justice, by any sense of the word, had not been done to him.

"...[and] that is all I have tried to do. This book is not an attack on any person, on the death penalty, or on anything else, though if it makes people think about these things, so much the better. I think I believe in the death penalty – I do not know. But I did not believe in Harry being shot.
That is the gist of it; that my friend Harry was shot for cowardice – and he was one of the bravest men I ever knew."

== Historical basis ==
The character of Penrose bears close similarities to Herbert himself – a man who had left Oxford and enlisted in the ranks, later to take a commission and serve at Gallipoli and on the Western Front. In its portrayal of everyday life it is almost autobiographical – many incidents correspond closely to the author's experiences, often down to exact details. However, the book is substantially "more than a disguised memoir".

The case of Harry Penrose's trial is thought to be based on that of Sub-Lieutenant Edwin Dyett, who was court-martialled for desertion at the attack on Beaucourt in November 1916, and later executed. There is no indication Herbert knew Dyett personally – they were in separate battalions – but the matter was generally discussed in the division, and close friends recall his being "so upset" by the events. The events of Dyett's case are somewhat unclear, though a recent book has discussed the case; it appears that he, like Penrose, was found running away from the front. Dyett was an unusual case – of the 266 executions for desertion (and 19 for cowardice), only two were officers.

== Critical reaction and long-term effect ==
The book was published on 29 May 1919, by Methuen, advertised as "A novel describing the human side of the soldier – his fears and everyday distresses of his life; of the gradual decay of his illusions; of his courage and his failure". and greeted as a "young man's novel, winning favour by its crystal-clear style and hard truth". Lloyd George "read [it] all night", and mentioned it to Churchill, who wrote in 1928 that it held "a permanent place in war literature", and described it as "one of those cries of pain wrung from the fighting troops ... like the poems of Siegfried Sassoon [it] should be read in each generation, so that men and women may rest under no illusions about what war means". H. A. L. Fisher called it "a masterpiece", whilst Montgomery thought it "the best story of front line war"; from a purely literary perspective, it received a very positive review from Arnold Bennett. Other reviews described it as "the best book published about life in the trenches" (New Statesman) and "one of the most interesting and moving English war books" (Athenæum). However, it was not a commercial success. The war was not the most popular of themes among the reading public in 1919, and the book saw only limited sales; it was not reissued for another five years, with a second edition appearing in January 1924. Assisted by Herbert's growing popularity as a writer, it gained in popularity during the war novel boom of the late 1920s and early 1930s – five editions between 1928 and 1936 – but never reached the fame that many of its supporters feel it deserved. A BBC radio adaptation was produced in 1957.

The book was the first novel to freely discuss the executions for desertion – the "shot at dawn" of popular legend – and has been argued to play a major role in setting the conventions of that genre, as well as of later historical discussions on the topic. Herbert himself later claimed that it had helped "alter in some way" Army policy on the management of courts-martial – Churchill was Secretary of State for War at the time he read it, in the immediate post-war period.

Samuel Hynes argued that the book was an "early and striking example" of a new form of war literature, the novel which dealt with a victim-figure rather than a heroic protagonist. The "damaged man" would become a major component of much post-war war literature – the veteran who is mentally scarred, altered for the worse, by his experiences; a protagonist who is "... not a hero in the traditional sense, but a victim, a man things are done to; in his war world, heroism is simply not a reasonable term. Against the weight of war, the individual has no power of action, he can only suffer."

The immediate commercial failure of the novel has been suggested as pivotal in Herbert's later career – it was clear to him that novel-writing was not likely to prove financially rewarding, which helped focus his efforts on light journalism and set the tone for most of his later writings. He would not write anything quite the same again – The House by the River (1920), a crime novel, retains something of the simple style, but begins to introduce elements of humour not found in The Secret Battle.

== Publication history ==
- 1919: Methuen & Co., Ltd; London. [1st ed.]
- 1920: A.A. Knopf; New York. [Dated 1919]
- 1924: Methuen & Co., Ltd; London. [2nd ed.]
- 1928: Methuen & Co., Ltd; London. [3rd ed.]
- 1929: Methuen & Co., Ltd; London. [4th ed.]
- 1930: Methuen & Co., Ltd; London. [5th ed.]
- 1932: Methuen & Co., Ltd; London. [6th ed.]
- 1936: Methuen & Co., Ltd; London. [7th ed.; Fountain Library]
- 1945: Methuen & Co., Ltd; London. [8th ed.]
- 1949: Methuen & Co., Ltd; London. [9th ed.]
- 1963: Brown, Watson; London.
- 1970: Chatto & Windus; London. ISBN 0-7011-1557-2
- 1976: Hutchinson; London. [Facsimile of 1919 edition, with introduction] ISBN 0-09-126600-9
- 1981: Atheneum; New York. [1st Atheneum ed.] ISBN 0-689-11156-8
- 1982: Oxford University Press; Oxford. ISBN 0-19-281328-5
- 1983: Encore Editions. ISBN 0-689-11156-8
- 1989: Methuen Publishing; London. ISBN 0-413-61870-6
- 2001: House of Stratus; London. ISBN 1-84232-607-4

From the third edition (1928) onwards, the book was printed with an introduction by Winston Churchill. The 1982 OUP edition included an additional introduction by the historian John Terraine.

== See also ==
- Under Fire, a 1916 novel written from Western Front experiences by Henri Barbusse

== Footnotes ==
Unmarked page references are to the 1982 OUP edition; "Churchill" is to that edition's preface. Other sources are given below.
