= Battle of the Ancre =

Battle during the First World War

- Part of the Battle of the Somme of the First World War
- Battle of the Somme 1 July – 18 November 1916
Date	13–18 November 1916 (5 days)
Location	North central Somme Département, France 50°4′N 2°42′E
Result	British victory

Belligerents
United Kingdom; France	Germany

Commanders and leaders
Douglas Haig; Hubert Gough; Ferdinand Foch	Crown Prince Rupprecht of Bavaria; Max von Gallwitz; Fritz von Below

Strength
12 divisions, 1 brigade	4 divisions

Casualties and losses
c. 22,000	1–18 November, c. 45,000 including 7,000 prisoners.

The Battle of the Ancre (13–18 November 1916) was fought by the British Fifth Army (Lieutenant-General Hubert Gough), against the German 1st Army (General Fritz von Below). The Reserve Army had been renamed the Fifth Army on 30 October. The battle was the last of the big British attacks of the Battle of the Somme. After the Battle of Flers–Courcelette (15–22 September) the Anglo-French armies tried to press their advantage with smaller attacks in quick succession, rather than pausing to regroup and give the Germans time to recover. Subsequent writers gave discrete dates for the Anglo-French battles but there were considerable overlaps and continuities of operations until the weather and supply difficulties in mid-November ended the battle until the new-year.

The British attack was to fulfil complementary objectives. Political discontent in London would be muted by a big victory, as would doubts of British commitment by its allies and British loyalty to the Chantilly strategy of 1915 would be upheld. The capture of Beaumont Hamel and Serre would go some way to redeem the failure of 1 July and obtain ground on which the British would have a tactical advantage. The attack was the largest in the British sector since September and had a seven-day preliminary bombardment, which was twice as heavy as that of 1 July. The capture of Beaumont Hamel, St Pierre Divion and Beaucourt threatened the German hold on Serre further north. Edmund Blunden called the battle "a feat of arms vieing [sic] with any recorded. The enemy was surprised and beaten". Four German divisions had to be relieved due to the casualties they suffered and over 7,000 German troops were taken prisoner.

== Background ==
=== Tactical developments ===
After a meeting on 17 October between Lieutenant-General Sir Henry Rawlinson the Fourth Army commander and Lieutenant-General Sir Hubert Gough the commander of the Reserve Army (Fifth Army from 30 October 1916), General Sir Douglas Haig, the commander of the British Expeditionary Force (BEF) cancelled the Third Army operation planned in September and on 23 October, the Reserve Army attack was reduced from a converging attack towards the Ancre river, to an attack up the valley. The failure of the Fourth Army attack of 18 October, caused another revision of the plan. The Reserve Army was to capture the rest of Thiepval Ridge with II Corps on 21 October, the Fourth and the French Sixth armies were to attack on 23 October and the reduced Reserve Army attack on both sides of the Ancre was to begin on 25 October. Gough issued a new operation order on 15 October and began another reorganisation on the north side of the Ancre.

The II Corps operation on 21 October succeeded but the rains returned on 24 October. The main attack was postponed until 25 October and then cancelled; Gough was given discretion to continue with postponements by Haig. On 27 October, Gough set 1 November as the provisional date, postponed it again on 29 October to 5 November and on 3 November, Haig gave Gough the choice of cancelling the attack and resuming operations when the weather improved. On 5 November, Haig suggested a subsidiary attack, if the state of the ground justified the effort. Gough proposed an attack on 9 November but preferred to delay the main effort. Haig agreed that there should be no attack until the ground was dry enough for infantry to move freely and there was a forecast of two days of fair weather; another postponement followed.

On 3 November, Major-General Rudolph Cavan the XIV Corps commander, wrote to Rawlinson, objecting to the renewal of attacks on Le Transloy, having already suffered 5,320 casualties. Rawlinson informed Haig that he was going to limit the next attack, which led to a conference at Fourth Army headquarters on 4 November, attended by Haig and General Ferdinand Foch. Haig explained that the Fourth Army would be attacking at other points on 5 November and Cavan agreed to make certain that the French left flank was protected. On 6 November, Rawlinson announced that the Fifth Army operation due in the Ancre valley had been reduced and that the Fourth Army would conduct "modified operations", intended to stop the Germans moving troops from France. Apart from attacks near Saillisel, the French Sixth Army began to consolidate for the winter.

After another discussion on 8 November between Lieutenant-General Launcelot Kiggell, the BEF Chief of the General Staff and Gough, a meeting between Gough and the corps commanders decided that the attack should begin on 13 November, if the weather stayed dry. Opinion among divisional and brigade commanders varied on the possibility of an attack and that it should go ahead or be cancelled rather than have the uncertainty of another postponement; patrols were sent out frequently to report on the state of the ground. On 10 November, Gough set the attack for 5:45 a.m. on 13 November. After studying the Fifth Army plans, Haig allowed the attack to go ahead and Gough later arranged with the corps commanders that operations towards Pys and Irles would begin if the attack on 13 November went well but avoided detail, due to the uncertain weather.

== Prelude ==
=== British preparations ===
To be ready for the big attack intended for 12 October, Gough began to concentrate more troops in the area north of the Ancre. In early October the north bank was held by the 39th Division of V Corps up to the boundary with the Third Army at Hébuterne. On 1 October, the 2nd Division was moved in on the left of the 39th Division to hold the ground from Redan Ridge to the army boundary. On 4 October the XIII Corps headquarters was brought out of reserve, to control 1,500 yd (1,400 m) of the front line up to the junction with the Third Army and the 2nd Division was relieved on the left by the 51st (Highland) Division. The 39th Division was transferred to the command of II Corps on 2 October and then took over the area south of the Ancre on 5 October, by extending its right boundary to relieve the 18th (Eastern) Division at Thiepval. By 7 October XIII Corps had the 51st (Highland) Division and the 19th (Western) Division in line and on 8 October, V Corps relieved the 2nd Division with the 3rd Division and 63rd (Royal Naval) Division. Gough issued instructions for the attack on the north bank from 4 to 12 October and arranged for the 1st Cavalry Division and the 3rd Cavalry Division to move close to the front line. The V Corps and XIII Corps artillery steadily bombarded the German defences on the south bank, where II Corps operations against Staufen Riegel (Regina Trench to the Canadians at the east end and Stuff Trench to the British at the western end, north of Thiepval) continued and conducted a simulated offensive with artillery bombardments, wire-cutting and smoke screens.

The British front line north of the Ancre had been moved forward across no-man's-land, until the average width was less than 250 yd (230 m). It was intended to isolate the battlefield with artillery and bombard Pys, Irles, Miraumont and Puisieux and the main trenches leading to the battlefield. On the II Corps front, artillery fire was to simulate an attack on the ground east of the old German second line (Grandcourt line) as would XIII Corps artillery on the German approaches to the northern flank. (Note: V Corps: three hundred and sixty-four 18-pounder guns, a hundred and eight 4.5-inch howitzers and eight Heavy and Siege Artillery Groups with eight 4.7-inch guns, forty-six 60-pounder guns, four 6-inch guns, fifty-six 6-inch howitzers and sixteen 8-inch, twenty-eight 9.2-inch, one 12-inch and two 15-inch howitzers. II Corps: thirty 13-pounder guns, four hundred and five 18-pounder guns and nine heavy and siege artillery groups with a hundred 4.5-inch howitzers and four 4.7-inch guns, sixty-six 60-pounder guns, four 6-inch guns, seventy-eight 6-inch howitzers, twenty-eight 8-inch, thirty-six 9.2-inch, three 12-inch and two 15-inch howitzers.) Slow progress on the south bank by II Corps, attempting to occupy Regina Trench, caused by a serious deterioration in the weather and the determined defence by the Germans of the remainder of their positions on the ridge north of Courcelette and Thiepval, caused numerous postponements of the general attack on both sides of the Ancre. Haig's plans of late September were reduced to achieving as much as could be done in periods of better weather. Conditions on the battlefield by mid-October, were "so bad as to make mere existence a severe trial of body and spirit". On 12 November, Beaumont-Hamel was subjected to a gas bombardment, similar to one on 28 October, when "sk" (lachrymatory) mortar bombs were fired into the village at noon to wear out the German garrison's respirators and then in the evening Phosgene was fired by Livens Projector to kill them.

=== British plan ===
Gough planned to attack on 13 November, with five divisions from II and V Corps astride the Ancre river, which flowed between Thiepval and Beaumont Hamel. (Note: A tributary of the Somme river 20–30 ft (6.1–9.1 m) wide, 3–4 ft (0.91–1.22 m) deep and flowing through marshes 200–300 yd (180–270 m) wide. North of the Somme are successive spurs of chalk downs which rise to the north, with villages and substantial woods in the dips and crests. Folds run parallel behind the original German front line, forming a ridge which culminates at the village of Thiepval. Thiepval had been captured by 28 September, from which observers could see from Fricourt in the south to Beaumont Hamel on the rising ground of the north side of the Ancre valley, with Beaucourt-sur-l'Ancre upstream to the east. St Pierre Divion lay on the south bank of the Ancre in the valley between Thiepval and Beaumont Hamel and was still held by the German army.) Gough intended to reduce the head of the German salient between Thiepval and Serre, the main effort coming from V Corps with the 63rd (Naval), 51st (Highland), 2nd and 3rd divisions, against positions north of the Ancre, which had not been seriously attacked since 1 July. It was hoped that the intervening nineteen weeks of trench warfare, had substantially reduced German fighting power. Three objective lines were set, the first running from Beaucourt Station (opposite St Pierre Divion)–up Beaumont Hamel valley–eastern outskirts of Beaumont Hamel–Redan Ridge–west of Serre, requiring an advance of 800 yd (730 m) over three German trench lines and four trench lines in places. The second line was 600–1,000 yd (550–910 m) further forward, running west of Beaucourt–east slope of Redan Ridge–east of Serre–west to the boundary of V and XIII Corps, which would be advanced towards Star Wood. The final objective (third line) was set at Beaucourt–the Puisieux road valley–second line. II Corps with the 4th Canadian, 18th, 19th and 39th divisions was to advance from Stuff trench and Schwaben Redoubt to the Hansa line to force the Germans out of their defences, from Schwaben Redoubt–St Pierre Divion, as far back as Beaucourt, securing the road bridges by Beaucourt station and Beaucourt mill by 7:25 a.m.

The V Corps bombardment was intended to create tactical surprise, by the heavy artillery firing on the German front line thirty minutes before dawn each morning, for an hour of intense fire joined by the field artillery. It was hoped that the German garrisons would become accustomed to the routine and not react, when the opening bombardment for the attack began at 5:45 a.m. No man's land 50 yd (46 m) back from the front trench was to be bombarded by 25 percent of the 18-pounders, to cover the infantry as it advanced from the British line. After six minutes the bombardment would creep forward at 100 yd (91 m) in five minutes, pausing on the reserve line of the German front trench system before moving on. The infantry had 56 minutes to reach the first objective and then move on after a pause of an hour. After five minutes of silence a lifting bombardment, beginning with intense fire, would signal the infantry to begin their advance. The attack by the 63rd (Royal Naval) Division on Beaucourt was to begin 200 minutes after zero, preceded by a bombardment from all available artillery. A few tanks were available and the bombardment was twice the weight of that before 1 July. A machine-gun barrage (first tried at the Battle of Thiepval Ridge, 26–30 September) was to be laid on the German machine-guns dug in along the ridge behind Beaumont Hamel.

Air reconnaissance reports late in the afternoon of 17 November, indicated that the Germans had abandoned Puisieux Trench and the Grandcourt line south of the river. Gough ordered both corps commanders to send patrols and occupy the trenches if possible. New orders were issued, extending the objectives for the attack planned for 18 November. The new plan for 18 November allowed II Corps a halt of 90 minutes on the first objective and the 19th (Western) Division would then attack Grandcourt and Baillescourt Farm. The 4th Canadian Division and 18th (Eastern) Division would then advance and take Grandcourt Trench to link with the 19th (Western) Division at the east end of Grandcourt. II Corps was then to cross the Ancre to take Baillescourt Farm. V Corps was to synchronise its advance to Pusieux Trench and River Trench up to Artillery Alley on the north bank of the Ancre. Lieutenant-General Claud Jacob, the II Corps commander, protested against the plan and was over-ruled, despite patrols from the 19th (Western) Division finding Germans repairing the wire of the Grandcourt line.

=== German preparations ===
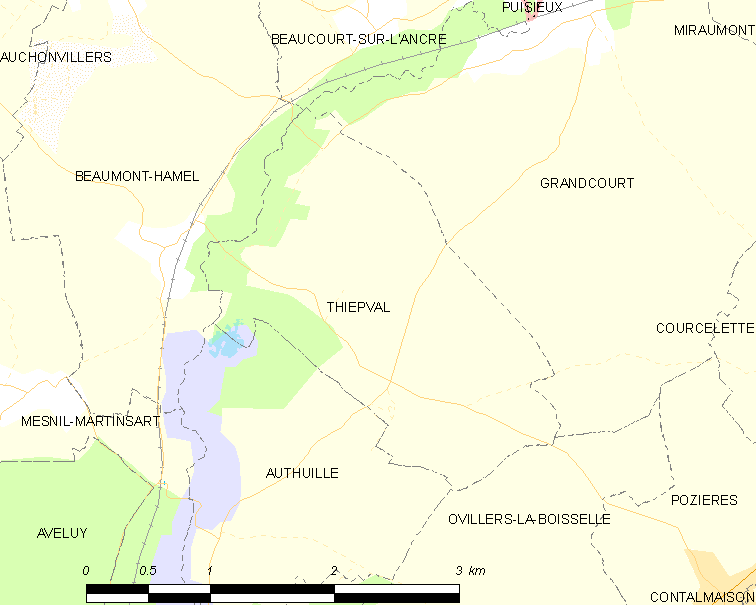
Map of the Beaumont-Hamel area (commune FR insee code 80753)

Agents had warned the German command, by 12 October, that an offensive was looming on the Ancre and in diary entries for 18 and 28 October, the army group commander, Field Marshal Rupprecht, Crown Prince of Bavaria anticipated the British attack. On 2 November, General Fritz von Below, commander of the 1st Army, reported that he expected an attack between the Ancre and Gommecourt and that there were signs that British attacks further east were over for the year. On 21 October, Rupprecht favoured withdrawal from St Pierre Divion and Beaumont Hamel but the 1st Army commander took a tactical view, pointing out that withdrawal would forfeit observation from the high ground and that no positions behind the line were better placed. The 12th Division was brought in between the 38th Division at Beaucourt and the 52nd Division at Serre on 22 October. The French attack at Verdun on 24 October, dislocated reliefs on the Somme but British pressure forced the replacement of the seven divisions from Le Transloy to the Ancre from 24 October to 10 November, then the relief of one of the replacement divisions. (Note: The 38th, 222nd, Bavarian Ersatz, 4th Guard, 58th, 1st Guard Reserve, 23rd Reserve and 24th Reserve divisions.)

On 22 October, Below ordered that on the south side of the Ancre, Gruppe Fuchs was to fight for every piece of ground and where there were enough men, ground was to be recaptured and fortified. Orders were issued to build new defensive strongpoints to shelter troops in reserve and then connect them into lines, the rear of the 5th Ersatz Division to be strengthened to make a possible British attack from Miraumont to Pys a slow and costly advance. Below also ordered an unyielding defence of the German positions north of the Ancre, even in positions enfiladed from the south. After the German recapture of La Maisonette, south of the Somme, on 29 October, counter-attacks against the French at Sailly-Saillisel and elsewhere were cancelled, yet there were no reinforcements for the 12th Division in the Ancre sector. A "fresh" regiment of the 12th Division took over at Beaumont Hamel from 26 to 27 October despite being under strength, its companies only having 80 to 90 men; by 10 November it had suffered another 175 casualties. Constant shelling and wet weather exhausted the German troops and cut off the flow of supplies until 11 November, when the British shellfire eased. On 6 November, Below and Lossberg, the 1st Army Chief of Staff, had concluded that the Ancre–Serre salient was too dangerous to hold due to artillery fire from the flank and rear; Below contemplated a withdrawal to Lesbœufs.

== Battle ==
=== Fifth Army ===
==== 13–15 November ====
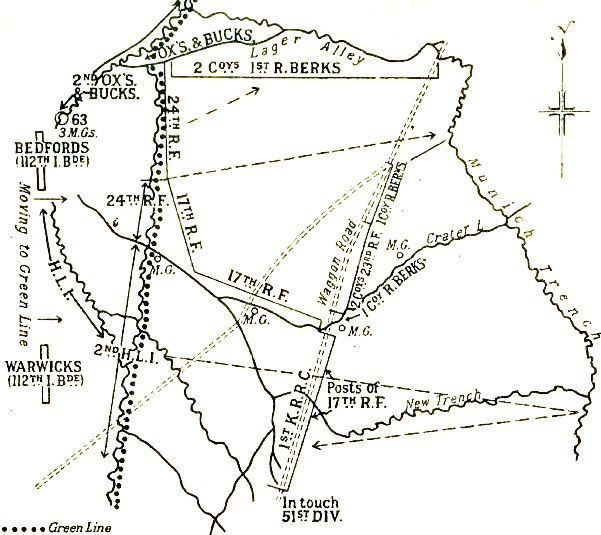
2nd Division positions, 14 November 1916

The seven-day bombardment cut the wire on most of the attack front and destroyed many German defensive positions, except the dugouts built deep below the villages near the front-line. The rain stopped on the night of 11/12 November and a full moon illuminated the landscape. Towards dawn on 13 November, a mist developed which reduced visibility to nil. The mist helped the British advance by reducing visibility but caused many units to lose the barrage as they struggled through mud. II Corps attacked on the right with 19th (Western) Division. A battalion from the 58th Brigade made no progress against Stump Road; the 56th Brigade attacked on the right by assembling in no man's land before Stuff Trench, with a machine-gun company attached and followed up by Engineer and Pioneer parties, ready to help consolidate captured ground. The mist helped conceal the British troops, who by 8:15 a.m. had reached their objective, partly along Lucky Way, a sunken road leading into Grandcourt. No German counter-attacks were encountered.

The 39th Division attacked to the west of the 19th (Western) Division, with the 118th Brigade on its right flank. The brigade formed up on tapes laid without the German sentries noticing and one battalion advanced north about 1,100 yd (1,000 m) to the Hansa line by 7:30 a.m., while three battalions attacked north-west to Mill Trench and then reached the station crossing and Beaucourt Mill by 10:00 a.m.; the other two battalions got lost in the fog. At 6:15 a.m. the 117th Brigade attacked from Mill Road up the Ancre valley next to the river, with one battalion and achieved surprise, despite a special barrage from twelve 18-pounders. The battalion cleared dugouts in the side of the river bank and along the top, then met some of the troops of 118th Brigade who were lost and combined to attack St Pierre Divion, which was captured around 7:40 a.m. Three tanks were to advance from Thiepval to assist but one was bogged on the drive to the village, the second broke down and the third reached the German front line at 7:00 a.m. then fell into a dug-out, where it was attacked by the Germans. A messenger pigeon was sent by the tank crew for help but infantry arrived at 9:00 a.m. and the Germans withdrew.

In V Corps, two 63rd (Royal Naval) Division brigades advanced with all four battalions forward and with two in support from the reserve brigade. On the right, the advance met much German machine-gun fire from the start but captured the German front trenches, then advanced on time to capture Beaucourt Station and Station Road, taking 400 prisoners by 6:45 a.m. The two battalions on the left were severely depleted by machine-gun fire, as was the left brigade although about 100 men reached the first objective. On the extreme left, only isolated groups managed to advance, where they met troops from the 51st (Highland) Division. The left brigade began bombing attacks and the reserve brigade was sent forward. By 7:40 a.m., troops were digging in along the German reserve line in the south, while three battalions were held up along the German front line, although some of their troops appeared on the Beaumont Hamel spur. At 7:45 a.m., about 450 men advanced to the edge of Beaucourt, before withdrawing slightly and digging-in under artillery fire, before gaining touch with troops from the 39th Division from across the river. The German strong point on Beaumont Hamel spur was attacked many times but little ground was gained. As night fell, the division had linked with the 51st (Highland) Division on the left, in the German support trench. Reinforcements from the reserve brigade and an extra battalion reached Beaucourt and extended the position to the left as far as Beaucourt Alley by 9:30 p.m. Two battalions reached the first objective by midnight and a battalion took over the British front line. (Note: During this engagement Lieutenant Colonel Bernard Freyberg, who went on to become Governor-General of New Zealand, won the Victoria Cross, despite being wounded three times.)

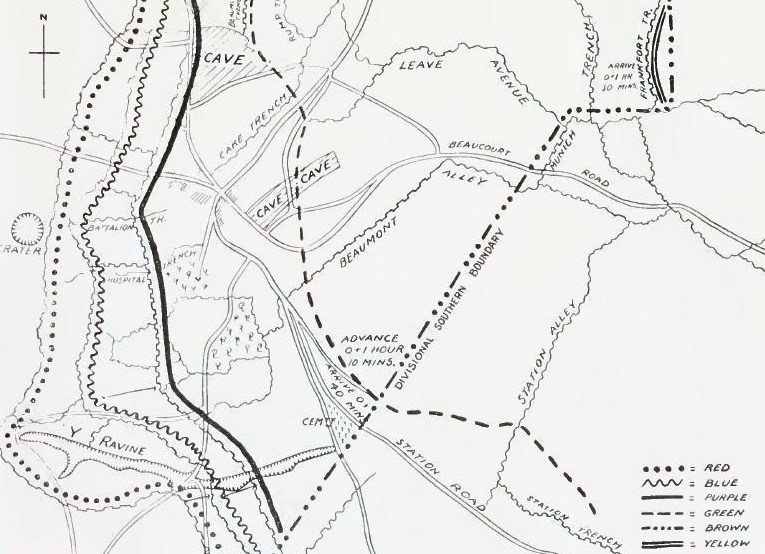
51st (Highland) Division objectives at Beaumont Hamel, November 1916

Both brigades of the 51st (Highland) Division attacked the first objective (green line) at Station Road and Beaumont Hamel and then the final objective (yellow line) at Frankfort Trench with three battalions, while the fourth provided carrying parties. Six minutes before zero, the leading battalion of the right brigade moved beyond the British wire and advanced when the new 30,000 lb (14,000 kg) mine at Hawthorn Crater was blown, passed the east end of Y Ravine and reached the first objective at 6:45 a.m., with a stray party from the 63rd (Royal Naval) Division. The battalion pushed on then withdrew slightly to Station Road. On the left, fire from Y Ravine held up the advance and at 7:00 a.m. another battalion reinforced the attack. Troops skirted the ravine to the north and early in the afternoon a battalion from the reserve brigade attacked Beaumont Hamel from the south, joined by troops in the vicinity.

The left brigade was held up in places by uncut wire, south of Hawthorn Crater and massed machine-gun fire north of the Auchonvillers–Beaumont Hamel road. Two tanks were sent up, one bogging between the German front and support lines and the other north of the village. Consolidation began and three battalions were withdrawn to the German reserve line and reinforced at 9:00 p.m., while one battalion formed a defensive flank to the south, as the positions reached by the 63rd (Royal Naval) Division were unknown. (Note: The short story writer H. H. Munro ("Saki"), a Lance sergeant in the 22nd Royal Fusiliers, was killed by a German sniper during this operation.)

The 2nd Division advanced along Redan Ridge; the 5th Brigade on the right formed up in no man's land, hugged the barrage and got into the German front line easily. Two battalions reached Beaumont Trench on schedule and the other two formed a defensive flank facing north and repelled bombing attacks from the 6th Brigade area, where the advance had been held up by fog and mud, then fire from "The Quadrilateral" in the middle of the 6th Brigade area, where some troops on the right managed to reach the first objective. The junction of Beaumont Trench and Lager Alley was blocked; some troops veered north-east after finding stray troops from the 3rd Division and assuming that they had lost direction. By 7:30 a.m. the 5th Brigade was ready to advance on the second objective and reached Frankfort Trench so depleted, that the troops fell back to Munich trench, Wagon Road then Crater Lane in the German front line. The reserve brigade moved forward at the same time and two battalions were sent to reinforce the 5th Brigade at the first objective. At 9:00 a.m. the remainder of the 6th Brigade was ordered back to the British front line to reorganise and two attacks by the reserve brigade were ordered then cancelled. Overnight the ground was consolidated and two 37th Division battalions were sent up from corps reserve next morning.

Weather 12 October 18 November 1916
Date	Rain mm	°F	
12	0	61°–55°	dull
13	0	61°–50°	dull
14	0	61°–50°	dull
15	3	57°–41°	rain
16	0.1	54°–36°	sun cold
17	3	55°–43°	fine
18	4	57°–48°	rain
19	4	57°–37°	rain
20	0	48°–28°	fine cold
21	0	45°–28°	fine cold
22	0	/°–/°	fine cold
23	3	55°–43°	dull
24	3	54°–45°	rain
25	2	52°–45°	rain
26	1	55°–39°	rain
27	1	55°–43°	rain cold
28	8	55°–41°	wet cold
29	7	53°–45°	wet
30	7	61°–48°	wet cold
31	0	63°–46°	–
1	3	59°–46°	–
2	3	59°–48°	–
3	1	59°–48°	–
4	2	64°–52°	wet dull
5	0	59°–48°	fine
6	0	57°–45°	dull
7	12	55°–45°	–
8	2	57°–43°	–
9	0	54°–30°	fine
10	0	50°–30°	–
11	0.1	55°–32°	mist cold
12	0.1	50°–48°	dull
13	0	54°–46°	fog
14	0	55°–36°	dull
15	0	46°–36°	–
16	0	46°–37°	fine cold
17	2	37°–25°	fine
18	8	54°–36°	–

The 3rd Division attacked Serre with two brigades, the 8th Brigade on the right using all four battalions and the 76th Brigade on the left attacking with two battalions and two in support, with 36 machine-guns. Waist-deep mud caused a fiasco; some troops from the 8th Brigade reached the German support line, then fell back and some lost direction. The 76th Brigade had the same trouble and at 6:30 a.m. an attempt was made to collect exhausted men scattered around in shell-holes. At 4:30 p.m. all operations were cancelled.

In XIII Corps, the 31st Division was to attack with the 92nd Brigade on a 500 yd (460 m) front to form a defensive flank. Two battalions advanced at midnight with snipers and Lewis gunners in support. The main attack began at 5:45 a.m. and the German first line was easily occupied. The advance to the support trench was contested all morning, with German bombers counter-attacking towards Star Wood. Carrying parties were held up in no man's land by German artillery fire and at 9:30 a.m.a German attack from Star Wood in the open was "destroyed" by British machine-gun fire from the flank. Due to the failure of the 3rd Division attack, the brigade was ordered to retire at 5:25 p.m. which was carried out by 9:30 p.m.

In II Corps, the 19th (Western) Division raided Stump Road and Lucky Way and began the relief of the 39th Division by extending its front to the Ancre, which was completed in the early hours of 15 November. In V Corps the 63rd (Royal Naval) Division continued an attack on Beaucourt Trench at 6:20 a.m. advancing from Station Road and losing direction in the mist. Some troops got to within 200 yd (180 m) of Beaucourt Trench and waited for the attack due at 7:45 a.m. The 190th Brigade advanced on time, linked with the troops near the objective and entered Beaucourt, taking 500 prisoners and digging in around the eastern outskirts. Beaucourt Trench was captured on the left and troops began to bomb down it towards Leave Avenue but no troops of the 51st (Highland) Division were found. Two tanks were sent forward to help mop up German troops holding out in the front line, one bogged but the other helped take The Strongpoint, where 400 Germans surrendered. Dugouts towards Station Road yielded another 200 prisoners. At 1:00 p.m. German troops were seen massing near Baillescourt Farm and dispersed by artillery; the captured ground was consolidated overnight.

The 51st (Highland) Division was supposed to have attacked at 6:20 a.m. when the 37th Division brigade, attached to the 63rd (Royal Naval) Division advanced but the orders were late and only strong patrols could be organised in time, which were forced back by the Germans. At 8:30 a.m. Munich Trench was occupied but British artillery began to bombard it at 11:00 a.m. forcing the infantry out into shell-holes. A company tried to bomb down Leave Avenue with no effect and during the night the digging of New Munich Trench began, in ignorance of the German evacuation of Munich Trench. The 2nd Division attacked Munich Trench at 6:20 a.m. by advancing an hour before zero but had many casualties from an inaccurate British barrage. Many troops got lost in the mist and some strayed into Leave Avenue in the 51st (Highland) Division area, thinking that it was Munich Trench, where they were pinned down.

Troops which did reach Munich Trench were severely depleted and confusion reigned when some German troops wanted to surrender and others refused. On the left flank, Lager Alley was crossed unrecognised, because of the bombardment and the troops extended the British hold on Serre Trench. Troops withdrew from Munich Trench later in the morning to Wagon Road where they were joined by part of a reserve battalion. On the left flank of the attack, a battalion took over the defensive flank south of the Quadrilateral–Lager Alley, which was linked to the British trench by Cat Street tunnel. Believing that Munich Trench had been captured, two battalions were ordered to attack Frankfort Trench at 2:45 p.m. and were surprised by German machine-gun fire from Munich Trench; the survivors withdrew to Wagon Road.

==== Air operations ====
Air observation for the infantry attack which began on 13 November was not possible, because of dense white fog during the day. On the morning of 14 November the mist cleared and 4 Squadron and 15 Squadron flew contact patrols, which revealed the capture of Beaucourt and ground to the north-west. Artillery observation flights gave the positions of 157 German batteries, many of which were silenced by counter-battery fire. German infantry were harassed from the air; 300 German troops spotted in a ravine north of Beaucourt were heavily bombarded by British heavy artillery after a "zone call". (Note: Before the Somme offensive, the ground was divided into zones to enable the rapid engagement of sudden targets. Zones were based on the lettered squares of the army 1:40,000 map; each map square was divided into four sections 3,000 yd (1.7 mi; 2.7 km) square. The observer used a call-sign of the map square letter then the zone letter to signal to the artillery, which was fired on by all guns and howitzers up to 6 in (150 mm) able to bear on the target, using corrections of aim from the air observer as normal.)

Another observer directing fire from a siege battery saw approximately 250 German infantry sheltering in trenches, brought immediate artillery fire on them and then the crew strafed them. Two battalions of infantry were caught on the road near Achiet-le-Petit and heavily bombarded. During the night ten aircraft from 18 Squadron made low attacks on railway stations, trains and road transport with bombs and machine-guns. A German aircraft followed two of the British aircraft to their base and bombed the aerodrome, leaving craters in the landing-ground. A dummy landing-ground was illuminated as a ruse and was machine-gunned by a German aircraft later that night.

There was good flying weather from 16 to 17 November and frost which improved the going for the infantry. Artillery co-operation worked well on 16 November when area calls from 4 Squadron, 7 Squadron and 15 Squadron aircraft led to devastating fire on trenches full of German infantry. An artillery battery was destroyed, seven gun-pits were demolished and 19 damaged, many of the 57 German batteries firing in the area being silenced. Contact patrols found the location of British troops easily, although one aircraft was shot down and two observers returned wounded. The railway junction at Hirson 90 mi (140 km) away, was bombed by 27 Squadron, attacking from 1,000 ft (300 m), hitting coaches, wagons in sidings and two station buildings. Other squadrons raided supply dumps at Courselles and Logeast Wood.

Air fighting on 16 November began when six British aircraft intercepted three German two-seaters, which had been sent to attack British artillery observation aircraft and shot them down. A new Albatros was captured and four more German aircraft were shot down by offensive patrols, which lost two aircraft. During the night bombing and machine-gun attacks resumed on German railheads, supply dumps and an airfield near Flesquières, while German night bombers raided a French airfield at Cachy and hit 21 aircraft. On 17 November fewer combats with German aircraft occurred, three aircraft being lost and three German aircraft being shot down. On 18 November, the final day of the ground operation, a thaw set in and rain and snow reduced visibility, making it impossible for British troops to be seen, even at low level.

==== 15–17 November ====
On 15 November, the 39th Division of II Corps completed the capture of Schwaben Redoubt, which took until 11:00 p.m. In V Corps, the 37th Division relieved the 63rd (Royal Naval) Division and linked with the 51st (Highland) Division to the north. Bombing attacks began up Beaucourt Trench towards Munich Trench, which reached the 51st (Highland) Division around 10:00 a.m. Patrols to Muck and Railway trenches found them empty (except for mud). Companies of the 51st (Highland) Division and the 2nd Division attacked at 9:00 a.m. and were caught in their barrage, some troops reaching Frankfort Trench then returning to New Munich Trench. A 2nd Division attack with two battalions of the 37th Division lost direction in the mist and fell back to Wagon Road with many casualties; a third battalion strengthened the left flank by bombing forward and building a strong point in the Quadrilateral, near the top of Redan Ridge; two tanks in support had soon bogged down. After dark, the 37th Division, in the V Corps area, pushed up Ancre Trench and set up posts in Bois d'Hollande and at Railway and Muck trenches. The 32nd Division, from II Corps reserve, took over from the 2nd Division on the northern defensive flank, where there was considerable confusion over the location of the front line. During the night the right linked up with the 51st (Highland) Division at New Munich Trench and Leave Avenue. During 17 November, the 32nd Division extended to the right to relieve the 51st (Highland) Division.

==== 18 November ====
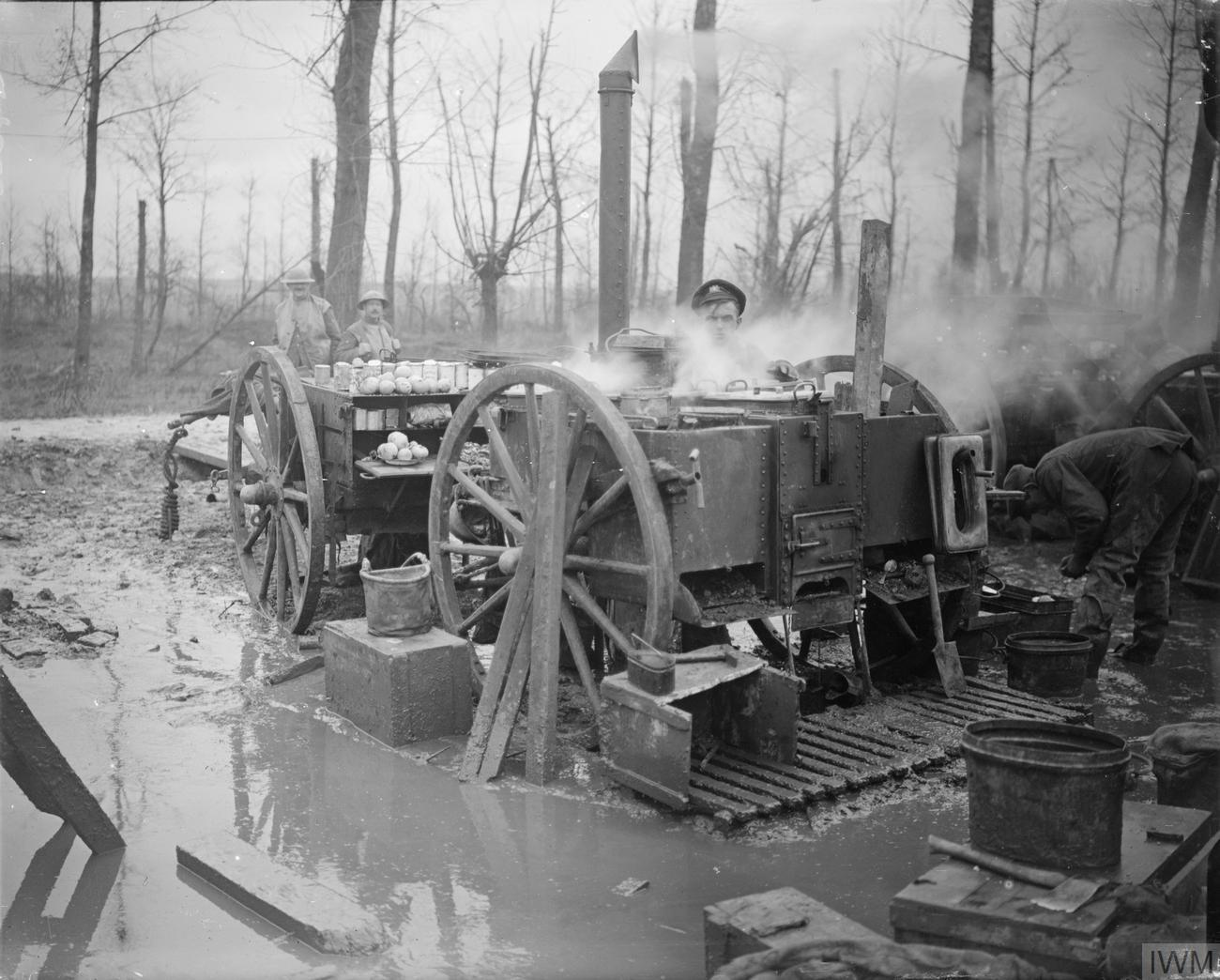
Field kitchen of the 2nd Battalion, Manchester Regiment near St Pierre Divion, November 1916

On 15 November, Gough was visited again by Kiggell to discuss the end of the offensive. After consultations with his subordinates, Gough asked for permission to continue for two more days, weather permitting, which was given that evening. By the morning of 16 November, Gough had heard that Munich and Frankfort Trenches were still held by the Germans and that casualties had been more severe than hoped. Attacks against Serre were abandoned and the main effort was made on 18 November by II Corps pushing down towards the south bank of the Ancre. V Corps, on the north bank, was to provide flank support by capturing Frankfort Trench, advancing along Ancre Trench and taking Bois d'Hollande. The attack was delayed until 18 November, to be certain that preparations were complete.

The first snow fell on the night of 17/18 November and the attack at 6:10 a.m. began in sleet, which later turned to rain, visibility being nil. In II Corps the 4th Canadian Division was to attack Desire and Desire Support trenches south of Grandcourt, roughly parallel to the Ancre. On the extreme right of the attack, east of the road towards Pys the 10th Brigade attacked to form the eastern flank of the attack and was obstructed by a new German trench; on the far right the brigade was hampered by a British smoke barrage. Fire from numerous machine-guns, forced survivors from the 46th Battalion to retire.

The 50th Battalion companies found little German resistance, lost touch with the 11th Brigade to the left, took 100 prisoners and began digging in behind Desire Support Trench, before losses from flanking fire forced them to retreat to Regina Trench. The 11th Brigade attacked in "blinding sleet"; the 75th Battalion lost direction and veered west, crossing the Courcelette–Pys road but the brigade reached the rest of its objectives, taking most of Desire Support Trench. Patrols went forward to Grandcourt Trench, found a few Germans, then took prisoner a German detachment near Coulee Trench, 620 Germans being captured in all.

West of the Canadians the 18th (Eastern) Division attacked with the 55th Brigade, which assembled in no man's land on the snow. By 8:10 a.m. Desire Trench on the right flank next to the Canadians was captured and a gap between the two right-hand battalions was closed by converging grenade attacks. The two battalions on the left flank disappeared into a gap where the 19th (Western) Division had lost direction and veered to the left. German machine-gunners moved into the gap and annihilated two companies and seven runners sent towards the missing battalions were killed. (Note: After the battle of Boom Ravine on 17 February 1917, the ground was searched and fifty British dead were found, preserved by the cold weather.) The battalions had been badly hit by German shellfire and the Germans held on to Point 66 on the Courcelette–Grandcourt road, before bombing attacks westwards along Desire Trench until night fell, which allowed the left flanking battalion to reach part of its objective. Posts west of Point 66 were withdrawn and Point 66 was connected to Regina Trench. Next morning, patrols moved west along the trench and by last light it was found that the Germans had withdrawn from the trench as far as Stump Road.

The 19th (Western) Division attacked with two brigades. On the right the 57th Brigade advance reached German positions west of Stump road on the boundary of the 18th (Eastern) Division and pressed on before being cut off and taken prisoner; 70 British troops managing to escape much later on. Further west, the British lost direction in the snow, then found it again but were stopped by uncut wire on the right, with many casualties. On the left, troops got into the Grandcourt line and pushed across Battery Valley on a front of 300 yd (270 m), into the south-west part of Grandcourt. The 56th Brigade advanced on the St Pierre Divion–Grandcourt road and along the railway to meet V Corps at Beaucourt. On the right, where the ground to the right of Hansa Road was firm, the attack reached the west end of Grandcourt and the attackers bombed their way to the 57th Brigade troops already there. The left battalions moved forward up the embankment (which was on the north bank of the Ancre where the advance began but was on the south bank between Beaucourt and Grandcourt) parallel to a platoon across the river at Beaucourt Mill and passed north around the west end of Grandcourt. The ground on the railway and the road at the edge of Grandcourt was consolidated by Royal Engineers. The left battalion of the division was to capture Baillescourt Farm on the north bank of the Ancre but one company was stopped by machine-gun fire from Grandcourt, as the other advanced along the railway embankment and sent out a patrol which met one from V Corps.

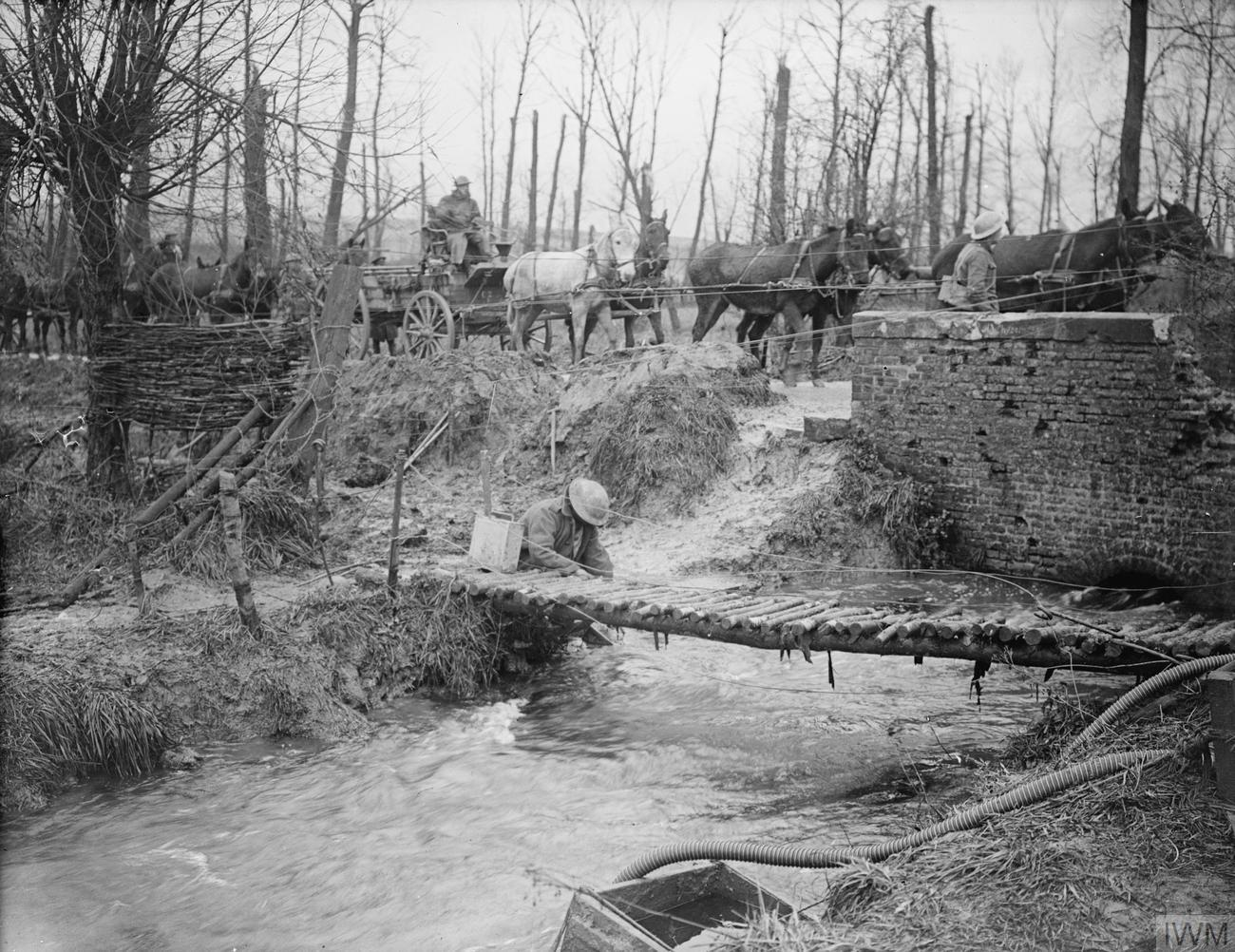
Water refilling point on the Ancre at the causeway of Mill Road, November 1916 Q4578

V Corps attacked with two divisions north of the Ancre. The 37th Division moved on its right through Beaucourt and at about 1:00 a.m., established posts from Bois d'Hollonde west to the Puisieux road and south to Ancre Trench. At dawn both brigades held Muck Trench and were ready to advance, once the 32nd Division on the left captured Frankfort Trench. At zero hour, patrols found German troops in Railway Trench; further to the left British troops bombed their way to the junction of Leave Avenue and Frankfort Trench, where the meeting with the 32nd Division was expected. Puisieux Trench was entered with difficulty and captured down to the Ancre and a patrol met the 19th (Western) Division troops on the railway.

The 32nd Division was to attack Munich and Frankfort trenches, between Leave Avenue and Lager Alley. On the right the 97th Brigade advanced with all four battalions at 6:10 a.m., through sleet and the right-hand battalion was soon stopped by machine-gun fire. The right flank of the centre right battalion was also stopped but further left the advance reached Munich and Frankfort trenches, where the British were cut off and captured. Troops on the left were stopped at a strongpoint in Munich Trench and held on in no-man's-land until dark. Further left the junction of Lager Alley was captured and down the hill, touch was gained with the 14th Brigade. The 14th Brigade was to capture Ten Tree Alley 500 yd (460 m) forward and form a defensive flank.

One battalion began early, advanced down Lager Alley, with its left on Serre Trench and descended the valley towards the village, that some troops reached, although most were captured or killed during the day. The next battalion on the left was quickly stopped by German machine-gun fire, after the British barrage fell 600 yd (550 m) too far forward and attempts to bomb forward failed, the battalions of 97th Brigade rallying in Wagon Road and New Munich Trench. German artillery fire was more effective, cutting communication apart from pigeons and runners. The only gain for the brigade was on the left flank near the Quadrilateral where a slight advance was made and consolidated. Ninety men of the 16th Battalion, Highland Light Infantry (the Glasgow Boys Brigade Pals battalion) were cut off in Frankfort Trench, where they held out until 21 November when 45 survivors (thirty of them wounded) surrendered.

=== German 1st Army ===
==== 13–15 November ====
The night of 12/13 November was quiet, then near dawn a mist formed and cut visibility to nil. At 6:45 a.m. a hurricane bombardment began on the German front line and a mine went off in the 1 July mine crater on Hawthorn Ridge. Around Serre, the 52nd Division began the defence of the village, which lasted for several days. Troops of the division had detected British digging in no-man's-land despite the fog and a patrol reported the British approach. Confusion caused by the mist allowed the British to get into the first two trenches north of Serre, which were eventually recaptured. After a quiet night, the 23rd Division troops from Infantry Regiment 62 at Beaumont Hamel, stood to at dawn in the fog and were surprised by the arrival of the post, which reduced tension; sentries then reported many footfalls in no man's land. The northern flank was devastated by the mine explosion and the front line was simultaneously deluged by shrapnel and mortar fire. The German troops followed the drill for meeting an attack, each man throwing a grenade as they lined the parapet and machine-gunners fired into no-man's-land. The British arrived at intervals in scattered groups, many smoking cigarettes and with their rifles slung.

Signal rockets were fired for the artillery but in the fog went unseen and the rest were thrown into no-man's-land to illuminate the British as they drew close, many of them falling into German trenches as they were shot. After about two hours, the British attack abated, when cheers were heard from Beaumont Hamel behind them and a line of German troops were seen in the mist, guarded by British troops. The mist lifted a little and many lines and waves of British troops were seen on the right flank advancing unopposed. A defensive flank was formed and fire opened on the British, causing many casualties, before a machine-gun began firing at them from behind and to the left, forcing them under cover. A machine-gun began enfilade fire from the right, causing many casualties. An unarmed German officer appeared and announced that he was a prisoner and that the British were through the support and reserve positions and in Beaumont Hamel. The Germans discussed their prospects and surrendered when British troops began bombing along the trench.

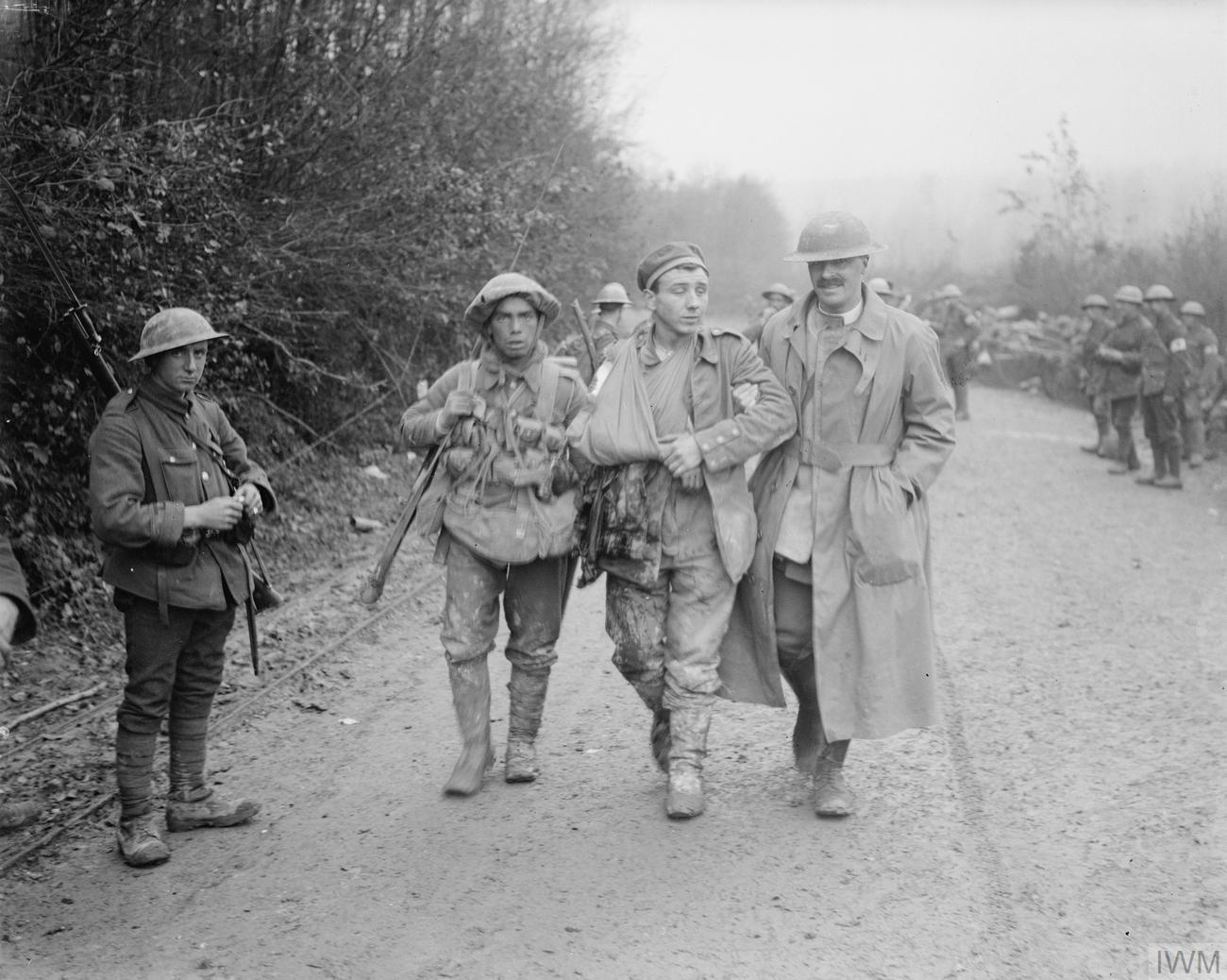
A Padre helping a wounded German prisoner along (13 November 1916, near Aveluy Wood) Q4505

Further south, Infantry Regiment 55 (IR55) of the 38th Division was forced to withdraw to avoid being surrounded after the breakthrough at Beaumont Hamel, allowing the British to advance around St Pierre Divion and Beaucourt; the British taking 2,000 prisoners, including all of I Battalion, 23rd Regiment and its headquarters. On the north bank, the survivors of IR55 made a stand in the Schloss-stellung on the west side of Beaucourt, running towards Alt-Wurttemburgfeste (Old Württemberg Redoubt) from which, with part of the 223rd Division, they devastated two British battalions advancing closer to the river; its reserve regiment was rushed to Serre Riegel early on 14 November. On the south bank, the 38th Division was being relieved by part of the 223rd Division, which having been formed a month earlier from youths and returning wounded, was of limited efficiency. The British barrage here was accurate and St Pierre Divion was captured with the loss of 1,380 prisoners.

Attempts to reinforce the troops on both banks of the Ancre began immediately. Infantry Regiment 144 (IR144) of the 223rd Division was rushed to Beaucourt and Ancre Trench behind the village. A battalion moved up on the south bank of the river then crossed an improvised bridge to occupy Puisieux Trench but no counter-attack could be organised amid the chaos. Some German troops in Beaucourt were attacked from behind and by 10:30 a.m. the British were consolidating the village. Part of the 26th Reserve Division was hurried south from near Cambrai by lorry and forced march, then sent to join the remnants of the 12th Division around Beaumont Hamel.

Ground to a depth of 6,600 ft (2,000 m) had been lost in the Ancre valley and German troops fought hard to contain the British advance around Beaucourt and Grandcourt. On the morning of 14 November, British artillery cut the link between the Schloss-stellung and Alt-Wurttemburgfeste but British attacks were costly failures. South and east of Grandcourt, British attacks from Stump Road during the morning were repulsed. The German command believed that the British offensive had ended on 14 November and General Max von Gallwitz, the German 2nd Army commander, requested leave as did Crown Prince Rupprecht (Gallwitz had to wait).

==== 18 November ====
The British tried again to capture Serre by taking Soden Redoubt to the south and early on had success in confused fighting, when the headquarters of III Battalion, Infantry Regiment 77 in Serre was captured. In a costly defensive success, which owed much to the great assistance from German artillery, the British attack was defeated by the evening, with many British soldiers being captured as they tried to withdraw and their prisoners liberated. (Note: About 165 British troops went to ground 300 yd (270 m) behind the German front line and were not noticed until 23 November, capturing German soldiers who strayed too close. Two German attacks on 24 November failed and the British survivors surrendered to Stormtroops who attacked on 25 November.) In the Ancre valley the 58th Division on the south bank, was being relieved by the 56th Division when the British attack began. The German positions began 980 ft (300 m) north of Regina Trench at Alter Dessauer Riegel (Desire Trench) which was held by patrols as a decoy away from Dessauer Riegel–Leipziger Riegel (Desire Support Trench), the main line of defence 490 ft (150 m) back in Kleine Mulde (Little Gully), an eastern extension of Stallmulde (Little Hollow). Stallmulde was 2,130 ft (650 m) south of Baum Mulde (Boom Ravine). About 330 ft (100 m) behind these defences lay Grimmaer Riegel, which the Germans were able partly to wire before 18 November. The last line of defence was Grandcourt Riegel (Grandcourt Trench) and machine-gun nests along Boom Ravine.

The British attack got forward 600 yd (550 m) beyond Beaucourt, despite many casualties caused by massed German machine-gun fire and local counter-attacks. On the south bank the front of the 106th Regiment was broken and I Battalion 120th Reserve Regiment was destroyed by an attack from behind. The 144th and 29th Regiments defended Grandcourt, where the 29th Regiment was defeated and the survivors pushed into the area of the 144th Regiment further east. South of Grandcourt, at 6:30 a.m. the 173rd regiment had been overrun by the time they emerged from their dugouts. The 8th North Staffordshire pressed on and was cut off and eventually surrendered. German troops who had not been pushed back into Grandcourt Riegel, were ordered to retire there in the evening of 18 November. Further east the German defence of the Pys–Courcelette road was forced back, until a counter-attack stopped the British advance. By the evening, German defenders held ground either side of the road, in an arc between Dessauer Riegel and the east end of Regina Trench.

=== French armies ===
French operations south of the Somme were delayed by bad weather until 7 November. (Note: Military units after the first one mentioned are French unless specified.) Bois Kratz, Pressoir and Ablaincourt were captured by the Tenth Army. Numerous German counter-attacks, including a big attack, after a two-day bombardment, at Bois Kratz and Pressoir on 15 November were defeated, after the Germans had gained a foothold at the east end of Pressoir and then been pushed out. North of the Somme, German attacks on the Sixth Army, from south of Bouchavesnes to Lesbœufs, captured the north corner and western fringe of St Pierre Vaast Wood but were repulsed along the rest of the attack front; French counter-attacks made progress on the northern spur of St Pierre Vaast Wood. On the morning of 16 November, the Germans entered Saillisel and Presssoir further south, by the evening they had been forced out; three German divisions had suffered many casualties. French airmen fought 54 engagements with German aeroplanes; on the night of 16/17 November, French night bombers dropped 1.5 long tons (1.5 t) of bombs on a railway station and aviation park. Preparations began for an advance to a line from Mazancourt to Happlincourt and Biaches, ready for a spring offensive.

== Aftermath ==
=== Analysis ===
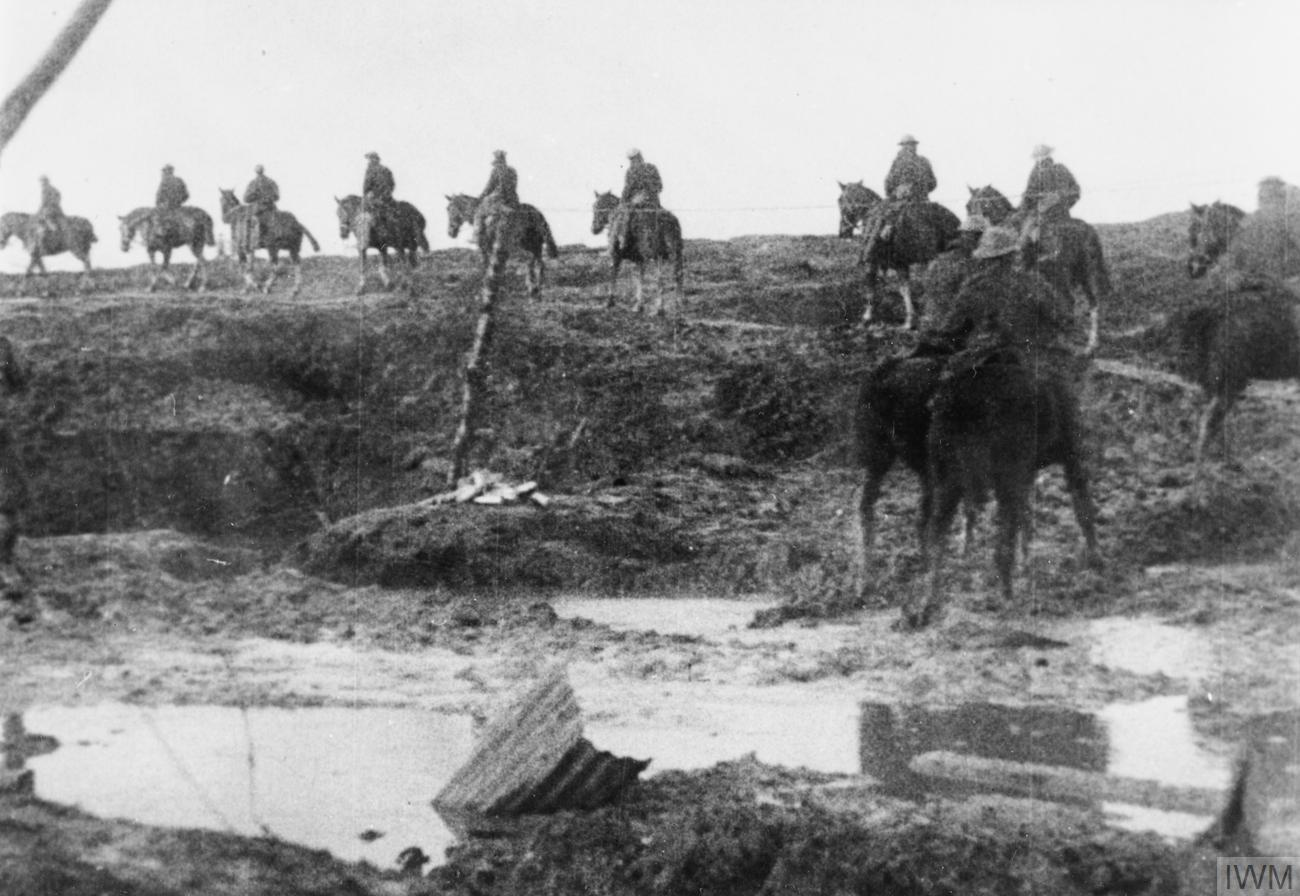
British cavalry on the Ancre

A 1st Army investigation of the débâcle at Beaumont Hamel found that the weeks of bombardment, lately from the flank and rear, had destroyed the German trenches and wire, although in the front line, most dugouts, 20–26 ft (6–8 m) deep, survived. Each morning the British simulated an attack, which sapped the alertness of the defenders. The real attack began after 15 minutes of Trommelfeuer (drumfire); the German defensive barrage failed to have much effect, due to visibility being nil in the fog, leaving the infantry unsupported. The 12th Division was blamed for lacking solidity and discipline and the divisional headquarters was severely criticised for inertia, which had only been remedied when the 1st Army headquarters took over. Edmund Blunden called the battle "a feat of arms vieing [sic] with any recorded. The enemy was surprised and beaten".

A dispute exists among historians as to the motives for the attack. Gough was visited by Kiggell on 12 November and told that a tactical success would be helpful at the forthcoming conference at Chantilly, although he emphasised that Gough was not to begin a battle under unfavourable conditions. During the writing of the Official History volume in 1938, Kiggell recounted that he had suggested the attack and had remarked that a "cheap" success would counter rumoured hostility from Lloyd George, just before the conference due on 15 November, as "an afterthought". Kiggell asked that Haig's later mentioning of his remark to Gough be omitted, to deny an opportunity for Haig's critics to criticise his motives. James Edmonds, the official historian, amended Miles' text to make Kiggell the origin of the political calculation, give due emphasis to operational considerations and deference to the tactical judgement of Gough by Haig and Kiggell

In 2005, Prior and Wilson claimed that Gough had been put in an invidious position and that having the meeting recorded by his Chief of Staff Neil Malcolm, was "unprecedented". Haig had arrived later and described to Gough some of his strategic thinking, that an attack would prevent the transfer of German divisions to the Romanian front, discourage criticism of France and Britain by pro-German opinion in Russia and would give him a success to take to the forthcoming Chantilly Conference, although he stressed that an attack should not be pursued at too great a risk. Prior and Wilson claimed that a small success on the Somme was unlikely to make much difference to Romania and Russia and was "sophistry". In 2009, Philpott called the "shock" that the Fifth Army gave to the Germans on the Ancre, an attack which demonstrated who had won the Battle of the Somme. Philpott described the grounds that historians have given for calling the battle unnecessary and politically motivated in a paragraph, then compared the battle with the attack of 1 July and quoted Ludendorff describing it as "a heavy blow".

The British had taken 7,000 prisoners; Edmund Blunden and Arthur Waterhouse, who took part, had written on the success of the battle and that the British had matched the Germans, who had defeated them at Beaumont Hamel on 1 July. Philpott contradicted Prior and Wilson and their claim that the War Committee had ignored Haig's "flights of fancy" and wrote that in October the battle "still had potential". Philpott described a conference at Boulogne, where Lloyd George failed to challenge the strategic consensus, was "maybe too pusillanimous" and should have resigned if he really opposed the battle. Philpott made the fate of Rumania the main concern of French and British politicians. [Haig's diary entry for 13 November, contains references to politico-strategic concerns relating to the battle but these are not "unprecedented". Similar entries are found on 10, 18, 19, 23, 26 October and 2 November, describing Anglo-French political and strategic relationships as they affected military operations on the Somme in October and November.]

=== Casualties ===
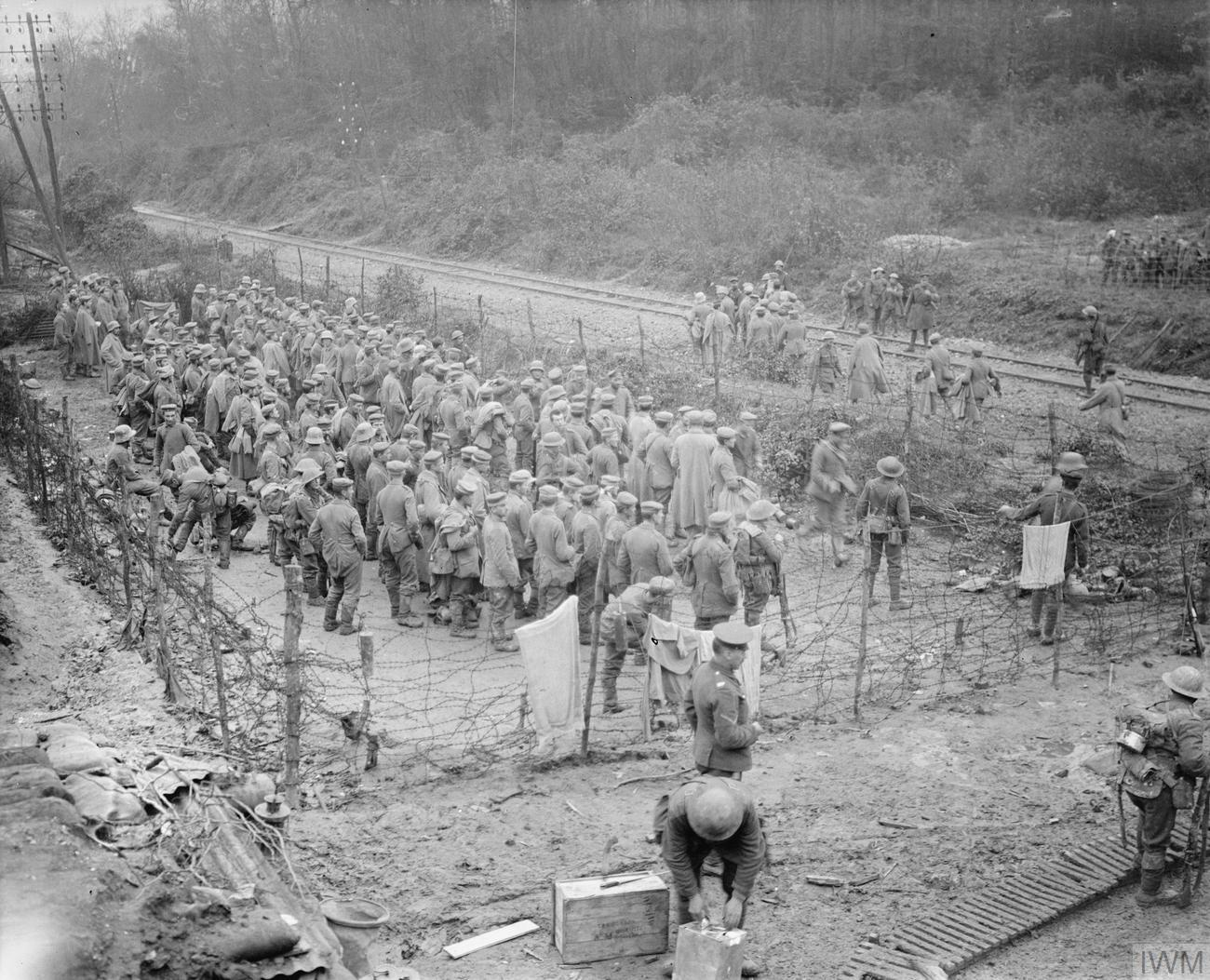
Prisoners taken by the 51st (Highland) Division, 13 November 1916.

Casualties in the 32nd Division from 18 to 24 November, were 2,524, more than 50 percent being "missing". Losses in the 37th Division from 13 to 24 November were 2,469 including sickness as well as casualties. In the 51st (Highland) Division from 13 to 17 November, there were approximately 2,200 losses. Losses in the 2nd Division from 13 to 16 November, were about 3,000 and those of the 3rd Division from 13 to 15 November were 2,400 men. The 63rd (Royal Naval) Division suffered approximately 3,500 casualties, from 13 to 15 November. The Fifth Army suffered 23,274 casualties from 11 to 24 November and inflicted so many casualties (45,000 including 7,183 prisoners from 1 to 18 November), that two German divisions were relieved twice, in what Ludendorff called a particularly heavy blow. In 1919, J. H. Boraston claimed 7,200 prisoners, including 149 officers.

=== Subsequent operations ===
On 19 November troops of the 19th (Western) Division defeated a German counter-attack at the west end of Grandcourt. Another defensive position was dug from the Ancre to Battery Alley 500 yd (460 m) away from the Grandcourt line, from which the British retired, as they were overlooked from the south end of the Grandcourt line, where it was still held by the Germans. Puisieux trench was abandoned, when the 19th (Western) Division was withdrawn from Grandcourt that night. The Battle of the Somme lasted from 1 July to 18 November on the British reckoning. In the southern sector, the Fourth Army ended operations on 16 November and on the French sector, the final action took place on 14–15 November in St Pierre Vaast Wood. On 22 November, part of the 96th Brigade tried to rescue infantry of the 16th Battalion, Highland Light Infantry, who were trapped in Frankfort Trench south of the Soden Redoubt; the effort failed and the survivors surrendered.

The German (1st and 2nd), French (Sixth and Tenth) and British (Fourth and Reserve/Fifth) armies, settled down to endure winter on the Somme. The British kept pressure on the German defenders with artillery fire, air attacks during bright spells and propaganda leaflets, purporting to be from German prisoners praising their treatment, although mud, icy winds, sleet and driving rain may have had more effect. Illness and exposure became common among German troops and at the end of 1916 was almost universal, leading to numerous reports warning that the German troops in the area, were unlikely to be able to resist further attacks. British attacks resumed in the Operations on the Ancre in January 1917.
