= House by the River =

1950 film by Fritz Lang

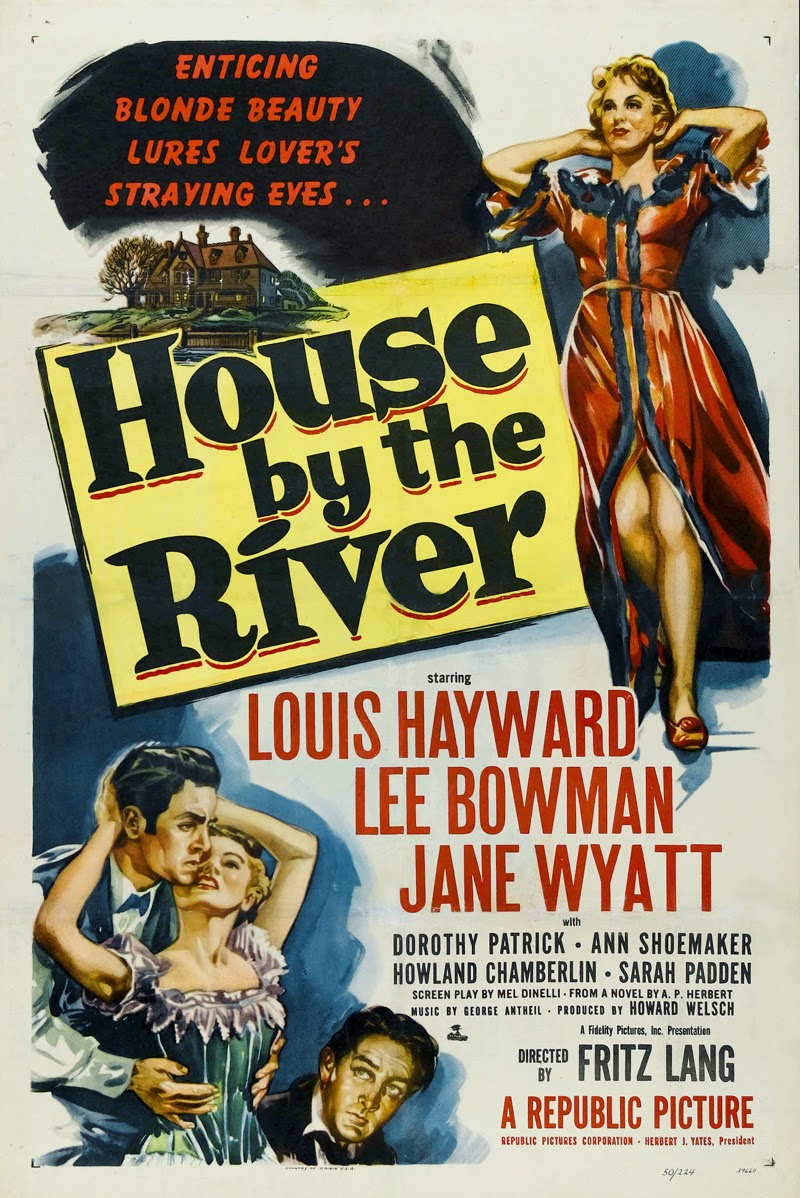
- Theatrical release poster
- Directed by: Fritz Lang
- Screenplay by: Mel Dinelli
- Based on: the novel The House by the River by A. P. Herbert
- Produced by: Howard Welsch
- Starring: Louis Hayward; Lee Bowman; Jane Wyatt
- Cinematography: Edward J. Cronjager
- Edited by: Arthur D. Hilton; Arthur Roberts
- Music by: George Antheil
- Color process: Black and white
- Production companies: Republic Pictures; Fidelity Pictures Corporation
- Distributed by: Republic Pictures
- Release dates: March 25, 1950; May 1, 1950 (New York)
- Running time: 88 minutes
- Country: United States
- Language: English

House by the River is a 1950 American psychological crime drama directed by Fritz Lang and starring Louis Hayward, Lee Bowman and Jane Wyatt. It is based on the 1920 novel of the same title by A. P. Herbert.

== Plot ==
Rich Victorian-era novelist Stephen Byrne, who lives and works by a river, accidentally kills his attractive maid Emily Gaunt after she resists his drunken advances. Stephen coaxes his crippled brother John to help him dispose of the body. They stuff the body in a boat and dump it into the river. Days later, the sack and body float to the surface and pass Stephen's house. He desperately tries to retrieve it in the water, but fails. The police recover the bundle and, because John's initials have been stenciled on the sack, it is all traceable to him.

An inquest is held and a cloud of suspicion hangs over John, who is tortured by his role in the situation and contemplates suicide. John and Stephen's wife Marjorie harbor feelings for each other. Stephen has used the maid's disappearance and death as publicity for his books. Looking to reap great financial gain, he begins writing a novel specifically about the crime in which he obliquely implicates himself in a manner that will not be evident to readers.

At a late-night meeting on a dock, Stephen knocks John unconscious and pushes him into the water. After returning home, Stephen finds Marjorie in his office reading the manuscript and she confronts him with her knowledge that he is the killer, having "read between the lines". Stephen strangles her so that she will not tell the police, but he stops when he hears John's footsteps coming toward the room. John, who is disheveled, enters the room and Stephen flees in panic. As he runs, he sees before him, in a curtain blowing in the wind near the top of the stairs, the image of Emily. He tries to run past the curtain but it catches him, wrapping around his throat, and as he cries out to Emily, "Let me go!", he falls over the banister to the floor below, presumably to his death. Back in the office, John and Marjorie, having heard Stephen's cries and the sound of his fall, look at each other in wonder, and they then embrace.

== Cast ==
- Louis Hayward as Stephen Byrne
- Jane Wyatt as Marjorie Byrne
- Lee Bowman as John Byrne
- Dorothy Patrick as Emily Gaunt
- Ann Shoemaker as Mrs. Ambrose
- Jody Gilbert as Flora Bantam
- Peter Brocco as Harry – Coroner
- Howland Chamberlain as District Attorney
- Margaret Seddon as Mrs. Whittaker – Party Guest
- Sarah Padden as Mrs. Beach
- Kathleen Freeman as Effie Ferguson – Party Guest
- Will Wright as Inspector Sarten
- Leslie Kimmell as Mr. Gaunt
- Effie Laird as Mrs. Gaunt

== Production ==
Director Fritz Lang wanted to cast a black woman in the role of the maid but faced opposition from the Hays Office, which forbade the depiction of romantic relations between blacks and whites.

== Reception ==
In a contemporary review for The New York Times, critic Bosley Crowther wrote: "Full of Victorian adornments, shadowy lighting and morbid moods, it is a desperate attempt to raise gooseflesh with a standard horror-psychological plot. But we fear that neither the enlightenment nor the excitement that a customer might expect in such a flickering melodrama is provided by this film."

== Adaptations in other media ==
The story was adapted for radio in 1948, on Suspense (February 28), in a production featuring John McIntire, Dan O'Herlihy, William Johnstone, and Robert Montgomery.
