= Made for Man =

1958 novel

- Author: A. P. Herbert
- Cover artist: Norman Thelwell
- Language: English
- Genre: Comedy
- Publisher: Methuen
- Publication date: 1958
- Publication place: United Kingdom
- Media type: Print

Made for Man is a 1958 comedy novel by the British writer A. P. Herbert. Herbert had long been a campaigner for reform to Britain's divorce laws, which had been the subject of his earlier novel Holy Deadlock. In this case the topic concerned the right of divorced couples to remarry in the Church of England. Herbert portrayed this through two couples who are unable to marry in church, with one pairing modelled on Princess Margaret and Peter Townsend. He had once divorced an actress, and so the Archbishop of Canterbury cannot marry them even though the prospective bride is his goddaughter.

== Bibliography ==
- Holmes, Ann Sumner. The Church of England and Divorce in the Twentieth Century: Legalism and Grace. Taylor & Francis, 2016.
