= Number Nine (novel) =

1951 novel

- First edition
- Author: A. P. Herbert
- Language: English
- Genre: Comedy
- Publisher: Methuen
- Publication date: 1951
- Publication place: United Kingdom
- Media type: Print

Number Nine: Or, The Mindsweepers is a 1951 comedy novel by the British writer A.P. Herbert. It was written as a parody of the Civil Service selection board and portrays several recruits attending a course at an assessment centre. They gather at the ancestral home of an aristocratic admiral, much to his dismay.

== Bibliography ==
- Raban, Sandra. Examining the World: A History of the University of Cambridge Local Examinations Syndicate. Cambridge University Press, 2008.
