= Uncommon Law =

Cover of the 1979 edition, showing Alastair Sim as Mr Justice Swallow, a frequent foil to Haddock

Uncommon Law is a book by A. P. Herbert first published by Methuen in 1935. Its title is a satirical reference to the English common law. The book is an anthology of fictitious law reports first published in Punch as Misleading Cases in which Herbert explores, as he saw it, rather absurd aspects of the law, and upholds his civil liberties with the protagonist Albert Haddock, representing Herbert's point of view, taking many to court. It includes perhaps the best-known of these cases, The Negotiable Cow. Herbert himself said "Albert Haddock made his first public appearance, in Punch, in 1924. I have always understood that I invented him: but he has made some disturbing escapes into real life".

Over his lifetime Herbert published five collections, entitled Misleading Cases in the Common Law, More Misleading Cases, Still More Misleading Cases, Codd's Last Case and Bardot M.P.?. Stray cases also appear in his collections of miscellaneous humorous essays, such as General Cargo. Virtually all the cases were assembled into two omnibus volumes, Uncommon Law in 1935 and More Uncommon Law in 1982. A shorter selection, Wigs at Work, appeared in 1966.

The BBC successfully adapted them for television as three series of A P Herbert's Misleading Cases (1967, 1968 and 1971: 19 episodes in total), with Roy Dotrice as Haddock and Alastair Sim as the judge, Mr Justice Swallow who has to unravel Haddock's logic.

== Selection of cases ==
- Rex v Haddock: Is it a Free Country?

Haddock jumps off Hammersmith Bridge for a bet and is arrested and charged with numerous offences by the bemused police, including "polluting a watercourse"; his defence is that "there is no law against it" and that he did it "for fun". The Lord Chief Justice disagrees, saying "it is a fundamental principle of English law that a person who appears in a police court has done something undesirable". When questioned on his motive that he did it "for fun", the judge states "We are not here for fun. There is no reference to fun in any Act of Parliament".

- Tinrib, Rumble, And Others v The King and Queen: Fish Royal

A dead whale is washed up on the shore of Pudding Magna in Dorset and a dispute ensues as to who is responsible for its disposal, which becomes increasingly urgent as the carcase has started to decompose, making the town unpleasant to live in. It is contended according to precedent that the whale is "fish royal" and therefore the monarch is responsible; however, the Ministry of Agriculture and Fisheries correctly points out that a whale is a mammal and therefore outside its jurisdiction. The appeal proceeds on the instructions of "the late residents of Pudding Magna", but is immediately adjourned.

- Rex v Haddock: Is a Golfer a Gentleman?

The frustrated Mr Haddock, unable to make his golf ball follow its intended trajectory, is heard to utter a stream of swear words, and is summonsed under the Profane Oaths Act 1745 which creates differing penalties for different classes of people, including gentlemen, to whom the highest rate is applied. Haddock argues that while playing golf, he is so bad at it that he no longer can be regarded as a gentleman, and therefore his fine should be lowered. He succeeds with this argument.

== Vehicles for law reform ==
Being a law reform activist, Herbert, through these "Misleading Cases", aired, initiated and sustained debate on various aspects of the law in which he saw need for change: copyright, divorce, defamation, liquor licensing, the police as agents provocateurs (usually Constable Boot) and rules of the road being some of the recurrent themes. At one point, Haddock turns himself into a limited company and insists to the court that he be called Haddock, Haddock, Haddock, Haddock Haddock & Co. because the copyright law states that copyright expires fifty years after the author's death (in the United Kingdom) (the fictional judge asking "Would this be Mr. Albert Haddock? Then we are in for some fun litigation") but since a company being in law a person he objects to a winding-up order to shut the apparently defunct company because a company never dies and so its copyright can never expire. Every time the prosecution calls him Mr. Haddock he intervenes "You mean the Managing Director". Haddock argues that individuals should have the same rights as companies. The case is found in his favour, Haddock also suggesting to the prosecution that it is open to other authors to take the same tack as he has.

== See also ==
- Clean hands
