= The Water Gipsies (novel) =

1930 novel

- First edition (UK)
- Author: A. P. Herbert
- Language: English
- Genre: Comedy/Romance
- Publisher: Methuen (UK); Grosset & Dunlap (US)
- Publication date: 1930
- Media type: Print

The Water Gipsies is a romantic comedy novel by British writer A. P. Herbert first published in 1930. It portrays the adventures of Jane Bell and her sister Lily, who live on a barge on the tidal River Thames. They enjoy several romantic entanglements during the story.

The novel is Herbert's best-known work, and reflected his lifelong love of British waterways. He lived in Hammersmith Terrace, and a thinly disguised version of The Dove pub appears as The Pigeons.

== Adaptations ==
=== Film ===
In 1932 the novel was made into a film directed by Maurice Elvey and starring Ann Todd as Jane Bell. It was the last film made by Associated Talking Pictures at Beaconsfield Studios before relocating to Ealing.

=== Musical ===
In 1955 Herbert collaborated with Vivian Ellis to produce a stage musical of the film. The cast included Dora Bryan, Doris Hare and Jerry Verno. It was a success, running for 239 performances.
