= Malavika Rajkotia =

Indian lawyer

- Born: Karnal
- Occupation: Lawyer
- Notable work: Intimacy Undone: Law of Marriage, Divorce and Family in India, A Daughter's Story, Triple talaq
- Website: https://rajkotiaassociates.in

Malavika Rajkotia is an Indian lawyer. She joined the Bar in 1985 and developed a practice with a focus on family and property law. She has handled several high profile and complex divorce and property disputes across various courts of the country.

She has been called one of the country's most successful divorce lawyers, and has handled several celebrity cases. Rajkotia is the founder of Rajkotia Associates, a leading multidisciplinary law firm specialising in matrimonial and property laws. She is the author of Intimacy Undone: Law of Marriage, Divorce and Family in India. The book explores the socio-economic and legal aspects of family law in India and has been called a tour de force. It has also been critically acclaimed for its focus on issues faced by judges, lawyers and clients in the area of family law by weaving a compelling story interspersed with accounts of Rajkotia's experiences as a lawyer and incorporating nuanced perspectives from law, history, psychology, literature and mythology. She is also the author of Unpartitioned Time: A Daughter's Story, published by Speaking Tiger in July 2024.

== Education ==
Rajkotia studied at Welham Girls' School in Dehradun. After completing a bachelor's degree in political science from Lady Shri Ram College, New Delhi, she pursued her law degree from Campus Law Centre, University of Delhi.

== Work ==
In addition to arguing several notable family law cases, she has argued for the custody rights of mothers facing domestic violence in foreign jurisdictions with regard to the best interest of the child and for the liberal interpretation of the doctrine of 'intimate and closest concern' in the context of international custody cases. Given that India does not statutorily recognise the principle of 'no-fault' in contested divorce cases, she has argued for the lowering of the threshold of 'fault' in the grant of divorce, in recognition of the right to privacy and autonomy of an individual. Rajkotia has advocated for an understanding of family law that does not blindly revere marriage as sacred, but instead acknowledges a more contractual arrangement, as sacredness cannot obliterate the individual's right to exit the wedlock for a just cause.

Rajkotia has handled numerous celebrity cases and stated that even though the voyeuristic interest in celebrity cases is higher, the proceedings are no different from a regular case. She has asserted against the perception of family law as a 'soft law', stating that it is a subject of marvellous complexity that has the potential to reform the very base of society. In 2011, a judge in one of her cases remarked that divorce lawyers were responsible for prolonging divorce litigation. Objecting to this claim, Rajkotia wrote a letter to the Chief Justice of the Delhi High Court, stating that such a view reflected a lack of understanding of the complex dynamics of matrimonial conflict. She then decided to elaborate on this notion in her book, Intimacy Undone, instead of sending the letter.

She has worked on issues such as the protection of civil liberties from procedural laws, gender rights, human rights and environmental concerns with various NGOs like Sakshi and IFSHA. She has also lectured at the National Law University of Delhi and spoken at the Judicial Academy, in Ranchi and Delhi on family law and gender sensitisation of judges.

Rajkotia was a part of the Lady Shri Ram College dramatics society and was an amateur theatre actor before choosing to pursue law full time. She worked in Hindi theatre with her teacher Sheila Bhatia of Delhi Art Theatre. In addition to her work as a lawyer, she has worked in about thirty Hindi and English productions.

== Commentary ==
Rajkotia has advocated for the concept of matrimonial property and equitable distribution in family and property law cases and has written on issues of gender, privacy in family law, marital rape, a rights based approach to family law, triple talaq, child rights, and adultery.

== Personal life ==
Rajkotia was born to a Sikh family in Karnal and lives in Delhi with her son and daughter. She was the anchor on Shakti, the first television talk show in India that focused on women's rights and acted in two episodes of a television law-based serial, Bhanwar".

== Bibliography ==
=== Books ===
"Intimacy Undone: Law of Marriage, Divorce and Family in India" Speaking Tiger Books, 2017.

"Unpartitioned Time: A Daughter's Story" Speaking Tiger Books, 2024.

=== Articles ===
Rajkotia has also written articles for publications such as India Today, The Hindustan Times and The Week:

- Let the law prevail, not doubts. (The Week)
- The case against abolitionists.(The Indian Express, 2017)
- Why Modi Govt's Triple Talaq is divorced from reality faced by Muslim Women. (India Today,2018)
- Thinking Privacy in Family Law.
- The Law and The Mob.
- The Law Commission's Questionnaire on Uniform Civil Code.
- Should we Sign the Hague Convention?
- The First Thing We Do, Let's Kill All The Lawyers.
- With both genders wanting to break away from the stereotype, this results in increasing stress.
