= The House by the River =

1921 novel by A. P. Herbert

- First edition (UK)
- Author: A. P. Herbert
- Language: English
- Genre: Crime thriller
- Publisher: Methuen (UK); Grosset & Dunlap (US)
- Publication date: 1921
- Publication place: United Kingdom
- Media type: Print

The House by the River is a 1921 crime thriller novel by the British writer A. P. Herbert. A young poet on the verge of greatness makes advances to the family maid while his wife is away. She resists and he accidentally kills her. Panicking he persuades his friend to help him dispose of the body in the nearby River Thames. However, when the body is discovered police suspicion falls on his friend.

== Film adaptation ==
In 1950, it was turned into an American film noir House by the River directed by Fritz Lang and starring Louis Hayward, Lee Bowman and Jane Wyatt. This shifted the action from the original setting of Hammersmith to the United States and moved the period back to the Victorian era rather than the post-First World War of the novel.

== Bibliography ==
- Goble, Alan. The Complete Index to Literary Sources in Film. Walter de Gruyter, 1999.
- Miller, Ron. Mystery Classics on Film: The Adaptation of 65 Novels and Stories. McFarland, 2017.
