= Beaucourt-sur-l'Ancre =

- Commune
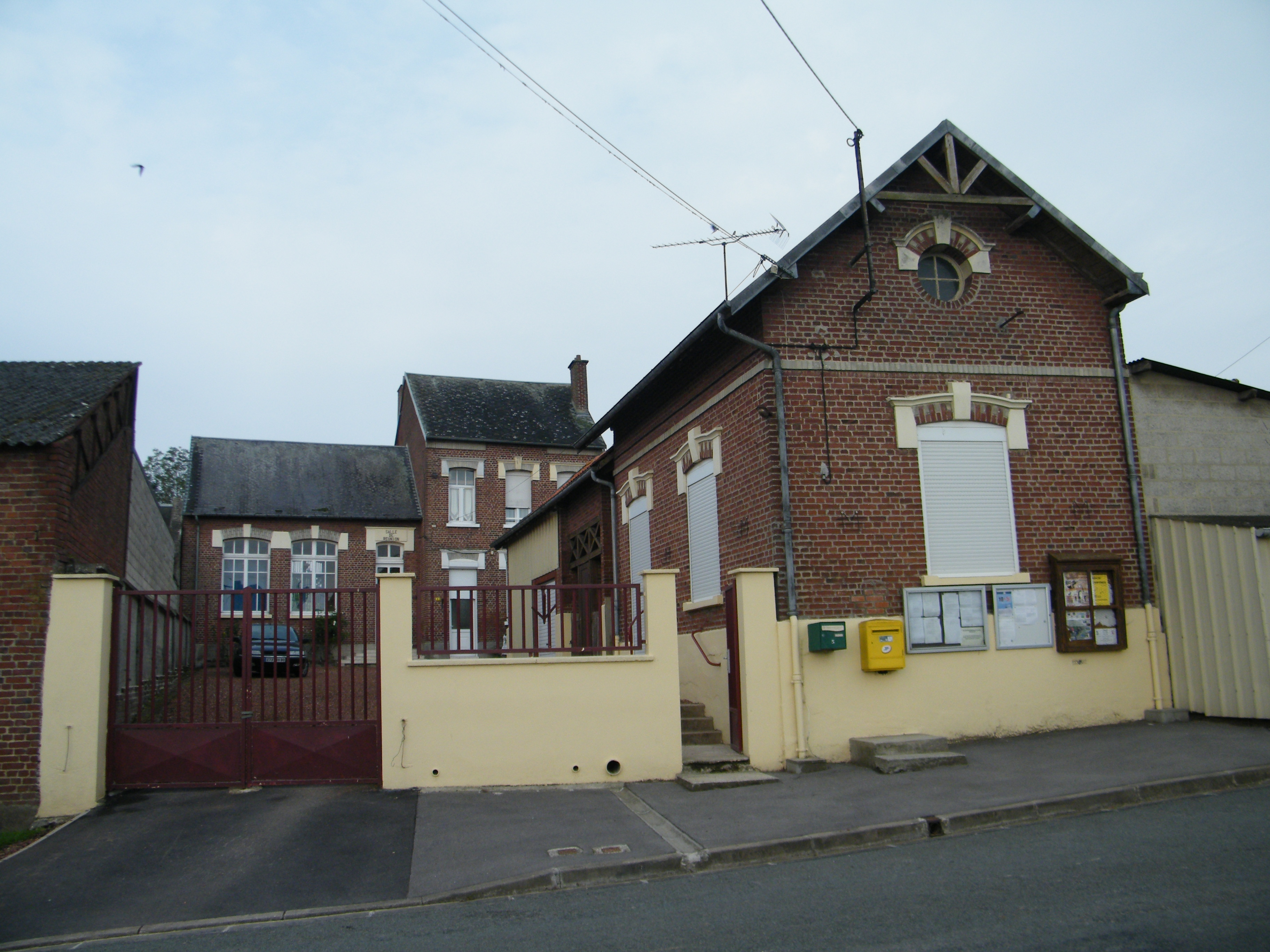
- The town hall and school in Beaucourt-sur-l'Ancre
- Location of Beaucourt-sur-l'Ancre
- Location within France Location within Hauts-de-France
- Coordinates: 50°04′50″N 2°41′12″E
- Country: France
- Region: Hauts-de-France
- Department: Somme
- Arrondissement: Péronne
- Canton: Albert
- Intercommunality: CC du Pays du Coquelicot

Government
  - Mayor (2021–2026): Jean-Claude Chavatte
- Area^{1}: 3.51 km^{2} (1.36 sq mi)
- Elevation: 77 m (253 ft)
- Highest elevation: 139 m (456 ft)
- Lowest elevation: 73 m (240 ft)
- Population (2023): 89
  - Density: 25/km^{2} (66/sq mi)
- Time zone: UTC+01:00 (CET)
  - Summer (DST): UTC+02:00 (CEST)
- INSEE/Postal code: 80065 /80300
- ^{1} French Land Register data, which excludes lakes, ponds, glaciers > 1 km^{2} (0.386 sq mi or 247 acres) and river estuaries.

Beaucourt-sur-l'Ancre (French pronunciation: [bokuʁ syʁ lɑ̃kʁ], literally Beaucourt on the Ancre; Picard: Bieucourt-su-l'Inke) is a commune in the Somme department in Hauts-de-France in northern France.

== Geography ==
The commune is situated 20 miles (32 km) south of Arras on the D50 and D163 junction. The Ancre river is little more than a trickle through marshy ground at this point.

== Population ==
Historical population
Year	Pop.	±% p.a.
1968	127	—
1975	111	−1.91%
1982	103	−1.06%
1990	90	−1.67%
1999	87	−0.38%
2007	83	−0.59%
2012	98	+3.38%
2017	95	−0.62%
2023	89	−1.08%
Source: INSEE

== See also ==
- Communes of the Somme department
