= Nines =

Nines may refer to:

== Arts and entertainment ==
- Nines (rapper) (born 1990), English musician
- The Nines (band), a power pop band led by Steve Eggers from Toronto, Canada
- The Nines (2007), psychological thriller and drama, written and directed by John August
- Nines (film), a film
- YoRHa No. 9 Type S, nicknamed "Nines", a character from the video game Nier: Automata

== Sport ==
- Nines (golf), a game that can be played in golf
- Nines (rugby), a variant of rugby league football
- Cambridge '99 Rowing Club

== Other ==
- Nines, Albania, a village in Fier County
- The Nines (hotel), luxury hotel in Portland, Oregon, United States
- Nines (notation), a unit used for uptime and purity measurements
- Networked Infrastructure for Nineteenth-century Electronic Scholarship (NINES), scholarly initiative supported by Applied Research in Patacriticism

== See also ==
- 9 (disambiguation)
- 9s (disambiguation)
