= Route 9 (disambiguation) =

Route 9 is the name of several highways.

Route 9 may also refer to:

- Route 9 (acapella group), a singing group based at Amherst College, Massachusetts, United States
- Route 9 (public transport), a list of public-transport routes numbered 9
- Route 9 (film), a 1998 American film starring Kyle MacLachlan
