= 9.0 =

9.0 may refer to:

- 9 (disambiguation)
- 9.0: Live
