= N9 =

N9 may refer to:

== Roads ==
- N9 road (Belgium), a road connecting Brussels and Ostend, passing Aalst, Ghent, Eeklo and Bruges
- N9 road (France)
- N9 road (Ireland)
- N9 road (Netherlands), a road connecting Alkmaar and De Kooy
- N9 road (South Africa), a road connecting George and Colesberg
- N9 road (Switzerland)
- Nebraska Highway 9, a state highway in the U.S. state of Nebraska

== Other ==
- Fairey N.9, a British seaplane
- Jero N° 9 Antwerpen 1911, a 1911 aeroplane
- London Buses route N9
- N9, a postcode district in the N postcode area
- N9, the Nokia N9 model N9-00, a MeeGo Linux phone
- Negeri Sembilan, one of the 13 states in Malaysia
- Netscape Navigator 9, a web browser created by Netscape Communications
- Nonoxynol-9, a molecule
- n−9 or omega−9 fatty acid
- North Coast Aviation IATA airline designator
- Northrop N-9, company designation of the Northrop YB-35 flying wing bomber
- Northrop N-9M, research aircraft, built as a flying mockup of the Northrop YB-35
- LNER Class N9, a class of British steam locomotives
- Denza N9, a Chinese full-size SUV by BYD Auto

== See also ==
- N°9, a shortening for Number nine
- 9N (disambiguation)
