= 9N =

9N or 9-N may refer to:

- 9N or 9°N, the 9th parallel north latitude
- New York State Route 9N, a state highway in Eastern New York
- GCR Class 9N, a 1911 class of 4-6-2 tank locomotives
- The International Telecommunication Union prefix for radio stations in Nepal
- Nepal, aircraft registration code
- 9N, a Ford N-Series tractor made from 1939 to 1941
- 9N, a model of Fordson tractor
- Gnome 9N, a model of Gnome Monosoupape
- Lorraine 9N Algol, a model of Lorraine Algol
- Typ 9n, internal corporate designation for Volkswagen Polo Mk4
- 2014 Catalan self-determination referendum, shortened to 9N due to being celebrated on November 9

== See also ==
- N9 (disambiguation)
