= 9 (disambiguation) =

9 is a number, numeral, and glyph.

9 or nine may also refer to:

== Dates ==
- AD 9, the ninth year of the AD era
- 9 BC, the ninth year before the AD era
- 9, numerical symbol for the month of September

== Places ==
- Planet Nine, a hypothetical planet in the outer Solar System
- Zheleznogorsk, Krasnoyarsk Krai, Russia, a closed town
- The 9, a residential portion of Ameritrust Tower in Cleveland

== People ==
- Louis Niñé (1922–1983), New York politician whose surname is usually rendered "Nine"
- Nine (rapper) (born 1969), American rapper
- Tech N9ne (born 1971), American rapper
- Nine (singer) (born 1999), Thai singer based in China
- J. J. McCarthy (born 2003), American football quarterback whose nickname is "Nine"

=== Fictional characters ===
- The Nine, epithet for the Nazgûl in J. R. R. Tolkien's Middle-earth legendarium
- ⑨, a nickname for Cirno, an ice fairy from the video game series Touhou Project
- Tails Nine, the New Yoke City counterpart of Tails from Sonic Prime

== Literature ==
- The Nine (book), a 2007 book by Jeffrey Toobin
- NiNe. magazine, a magazine for teenage girls
- Nine (manga), a 1978 baseball manga series by Mitsuru Adachi
- "9" inset comics magazine in Eleftherotypia, a Greek newspaper

== Films ==
- 9 (2002 film), a feature film by Ümit Ünal
- 9 (2005 film), a short film by Shane Acker
- 9 (2009 animated film), a feature film based on the short film by Shane Acker
- 9 (2016 film), a Canadian collaborative film by nine directors
- 9 (2019 film), a Malayalam feature film starring Prithviraj Sukumaran
- 9 (2021 film), a Uruguayan-Argentine sports drama film
- Nine (2009 live-action film), a film based on the musical of the same name
- Nines (film), a 2003 film
- The Nines, a 2007 film starring Ryan Reynolds

== Television ==
=== TV shows ===
- The Nine (TV series), a serial drama television show that aired on ABC
- Nine (TV series), a 2013 South Korean TV series
- The 9, a local TV news programme, also known as The 6 (news programme)
- The Nine (BBC Scotland), a nightly news programme in Scotland, airing at 9pm
- 9 (TV series), a 2018 Burmese television series
- KBS News 9, a South Korean flagship news program broadcast on KBS 1

=== TV networks, stations, channels ===
- Nine Media Corporation, Philippine media company
  - 9TV, its defunct free-to-air channel
- Nine Network, a TV network in Australia
- WGN-TV (WGN 9), a channel in Chicago
- WWOR-TV (My 9), a channel in New York City
- TV9 (Malaysian TV network), a Malaysian free-to-air TV network

== Other visual media ==
- Nine (musical), a 1982 Broadway musical, also with a film version

== Brands and enterprises ==
- The9, a NASDAQ-listed Chinese game publisher specializing in MMORPGs
- Nine Entertainment, an Australian media company and brand

== Music ==
- Ninth (interval), in music theory, the ninth note of a musical scale or the interval between the first and ninth notes

=== Albums ===
- 9 (Cashmere Cat album), 2017
- 9 (Damien Rice album), 2006
- 9 (Eros Ramazzotti album), 2003
- 9 (Lara Fabian album), 2005
- 9 (Mercyful Fate album), 1999
- 9 (Public Image Ltd. album), 1989
- 9 (Do As Infinity album), 2001
- 9 (Alice Nine album), 2012
- 9 (Lil' Kim album), 2019
- 9 (Polina Gagarina album), 2016
- 9 (Pond album), 2021
- 9 (Jason Aldean album), 2019
- Nine (Fairport Convention album), 1973
- Nine (Shankar Mahadevan album), 2003
- Nine (Circus Maximus album), 2012
- Nine (Tim Hardin album), 1973
- Nine (Samantha Jade album), 2015
- Nine (Blink-182 album), 2019
- Nine (Sault album), 2021
- Nine (Bleeding Through album), 2025
- Nine (Ben&Ben album), 2026

=== Songs ===
- "9", a song by Drake from the album Views (2016)
- "9", a song by Willow Smith featuring SZA from the EP 3 (2014)
- "Nine", the first single of Leeds-based band ¡Forward, Russia!, released in April 2005
- "Nine", a song on the Grand Magus album Wolf's Return
- "Nine", a song on the Neurosis album Given to the Rising
- "Nine", a song on the Rolo Tomassi album Hysterics
- "The Nine", a 1998 song by drum and bass group Bad Company

=== Bands ===
- 9nine or 9 nine (pronounced "nine"), a Japanese girl group
- Nine (band), a Swedish hardcore band
- The9 (group), a Chinese girl group
- Slipknot (band), an American heavy metal band sometimes called The Nine, referring to its number of members

== Sports ==
- Niners, a reference to The San Francisco 49ers
- Number 9, the shirt number often worn by an association football team's centre forward
- False 9 or False Number 9, a term used to describe an unconventional association football lone striker or centre-forward, who drops deep into midfield

== Transportation ==
- 9 (New York City Subway service), a designation given to several IRT services of the New York City Subway
- 9 (Los Angeles Railway), a line operated by the Los Angeles Railway from 1932 to 1956
- Line 9
- Renault 9, a family car
- DS 9, an executive car

== Other uses ==
- 9 mm caliber, a firearms cartridge & bullet size
  - 9×19mm Parabellum, a popular handgun cartridge
- Nines (notation), a term used to indicate purity of metals or chemicals, or the availability of a system
- 9, X-SAMPA symbol for an open-mid front rounded vowel
- 9 Metis, an asteroid in the asteroid belt
- Core 9, a brand of processors by Intel

== See also ==
- Nina (name)
- 09 (disambiguation), the numerical abbreviation
- Nines (disambiguation)
- Number nine (disambiguation)
