= Fineness =

Weight of fine metal in a precious metal object

The fineness of a precious metal object (coin, bar, jewelry, etc.) represents the weight of fine metal therein, in proportion to the total weight which includes alloying base metals and any impurities. Alloy metals are added to increase the hardness and durability of coins and jewelry, alter colors, decrease the cost per weight, or avoid the cost of high-purity refinement. For example, copper is added to the precious metal silver to make a more durable alloy for use in coins, housewares and jewelry. Coin silver, which was used for making silver coins in the past, contains 90% silver and 10% copper, by mass. Sterling silver contains 92.5% silver and 7.5% of other metals, usually copper, by mass.

Various ways of expressing fineness have been used and two remain in common use: millesimal fineness expressed in units of parts per 1,000 and karats or carats used only for gold. Karats measure the parts per 24, so that 18 karat = 18/24 = 75% gold and 24 karat gold is considered 100% gold.

== Millesimal fineness ==
Millesimal fineness is a system of denoting the purity of platinum, gold and silver alloys by parts per thousand of pure metal by mass in the alloy. For example, an alloy containing 75% gold is denoted as "750". Many European countries use decimal hallmark stamps (i.e., "585", "750", etc.) rather than "14 k", "18 k", etc., which is currently used in the United States, and was standard in the United Kingdom prior to the 1970s.

It is an extension of the older karat system of denoting the purity of gold by fractions of 24, such as "18 karat" for an alloy with 75% (18 parts per 24) pure gold by mass.

The millesimal fineness is usually rounded to a three figure number, particularly where used as a hallmark, and the fineness may vary slightly from the traditional versions of purity.

The most common millesimal finenesses used for precious metals and the most common terms for them are:

=== Platinum ===
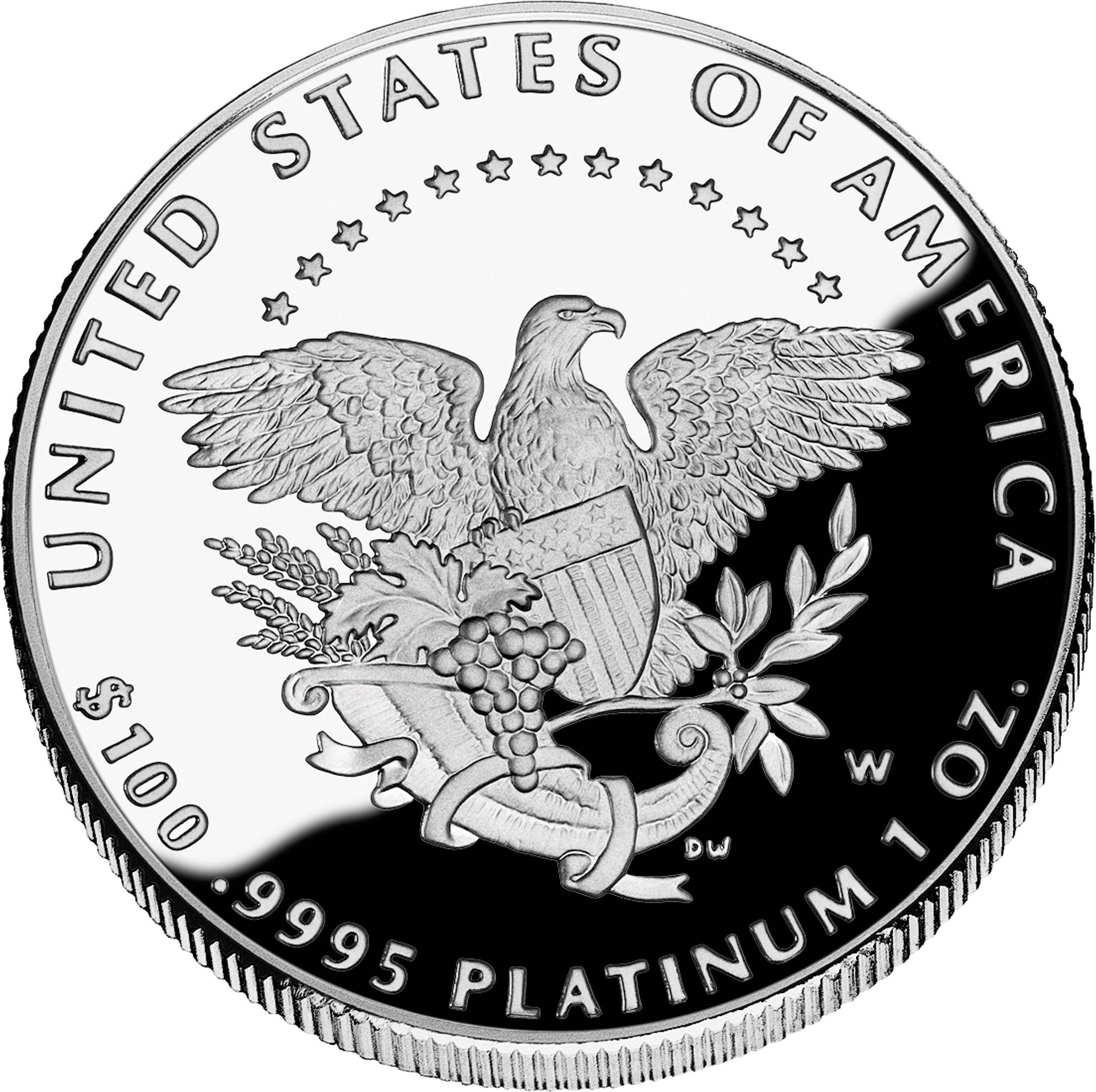
2005 American Platinum Eagle noting .9995 platinum

- 999.5: what most dealers would buy as if 100% pure; the most common purity for platinum bullion coins and bars
- 999—three nines fine
- 950: the most common purity for platinum jewelry
- 900—one nine fine
- 850
- 750

=== Gold ===
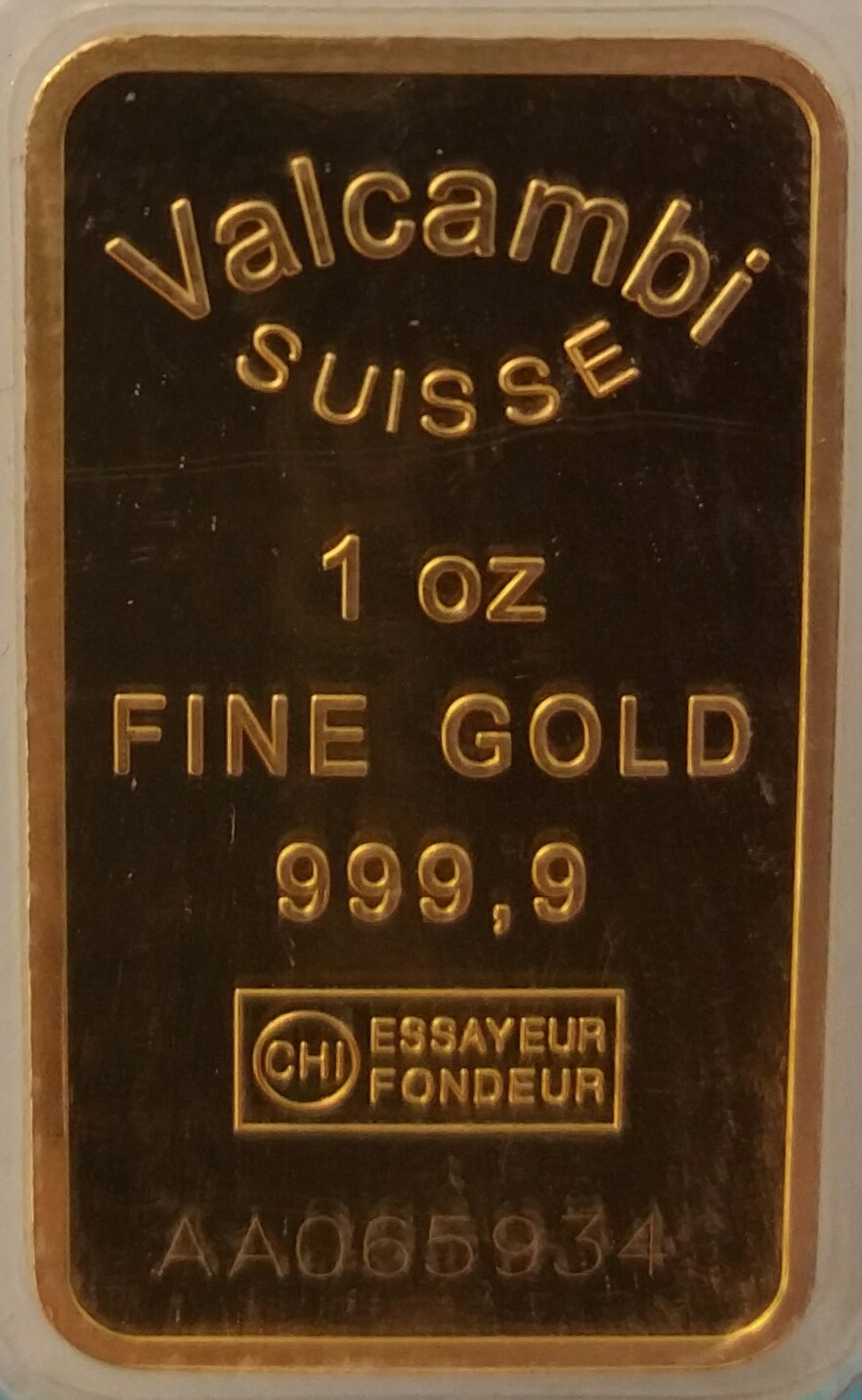
1 troy ounce of four nines fine gold (999.9)

- 999.999—six nines fine: The purest gold ever produced, refined by the Perth Mint in 1957.
- 999.99—five nines fine: The purest type of gold in production; the Royal Canadian Mint regularly produces commemorative coins in this fineness, including the world's largest, at 100 kg.
- 999.9—four nines fine: Most popular. E.g. ordinary Canadian Gold Maple Leaf and American Buffalo coins.
- 999—24 karat, also occasionally known as three nines fine: e.g., Chinese Gold Panda coins.
- 995: The minimum allowed in Good Delivery gold bars.
- 990—two nines fine
- 986—Ducat fineness: Formerly used by Venetian and Holy Roman Empire mints; still in use in Austria and Hungary.
- 965: Thai standard for gold purity. Often considered equivalent to 23 karat in this context.
- 958—23 karat
- 916—22 karat: Crown gold. Historically common for bullion coins, and currently used for British Sovereigns, South African Krugerrands, and the modern (since 1986) American Gold Eagles. Standard for jewelry in some countries such as India.
- 900—one nine fine: American Eagle denominations for 1837–1933; used in Latin Monetary Union mintage (e.g. French and Swiss "Napoleon coin" 20 francs).
- 899—American Eagles briefly for 1834–1836.
- 834—20 karat

Hallmarks can denote the millesimal fineness. These Lithuanian hallmarks are used for 18 karat gold and 14 karat gold.

- 750—18 karat: Typical fineness for modern jewelry in most of Europe. Even in regions where higher purities are common, this is the maximum fineness used for gemstone-set jewelry, as the metal must be hard enough to robustly hold the stone in place.
- 625—15 karat
- 585—14 karat: Most common fineness for jewelry in the United States. While 14 karat is more precisely 583.3 fine, this level is not generally used in decimal fineness.
- 500—12 karat
- 417—10 karat: Historically, the minimum standard for gold in the US. As of August 2018, any marked karat is permissible.
- 375—9 karat: Minimum standard for gold in some of the Commonwealth realms: Australia, Canada, New Zealand, UK, etc. It is also the minimum in Austria, Ireland, Portugal and France.
- 333—8 karat: Minimum standard for gold in Germany after 1884. It is also the minimum for Denmark, Greece and Mexico.
- 042–1 karat: Legal minimum for gold in the US since the revision of the FTC Guides of August 2018.

=== Silver ===
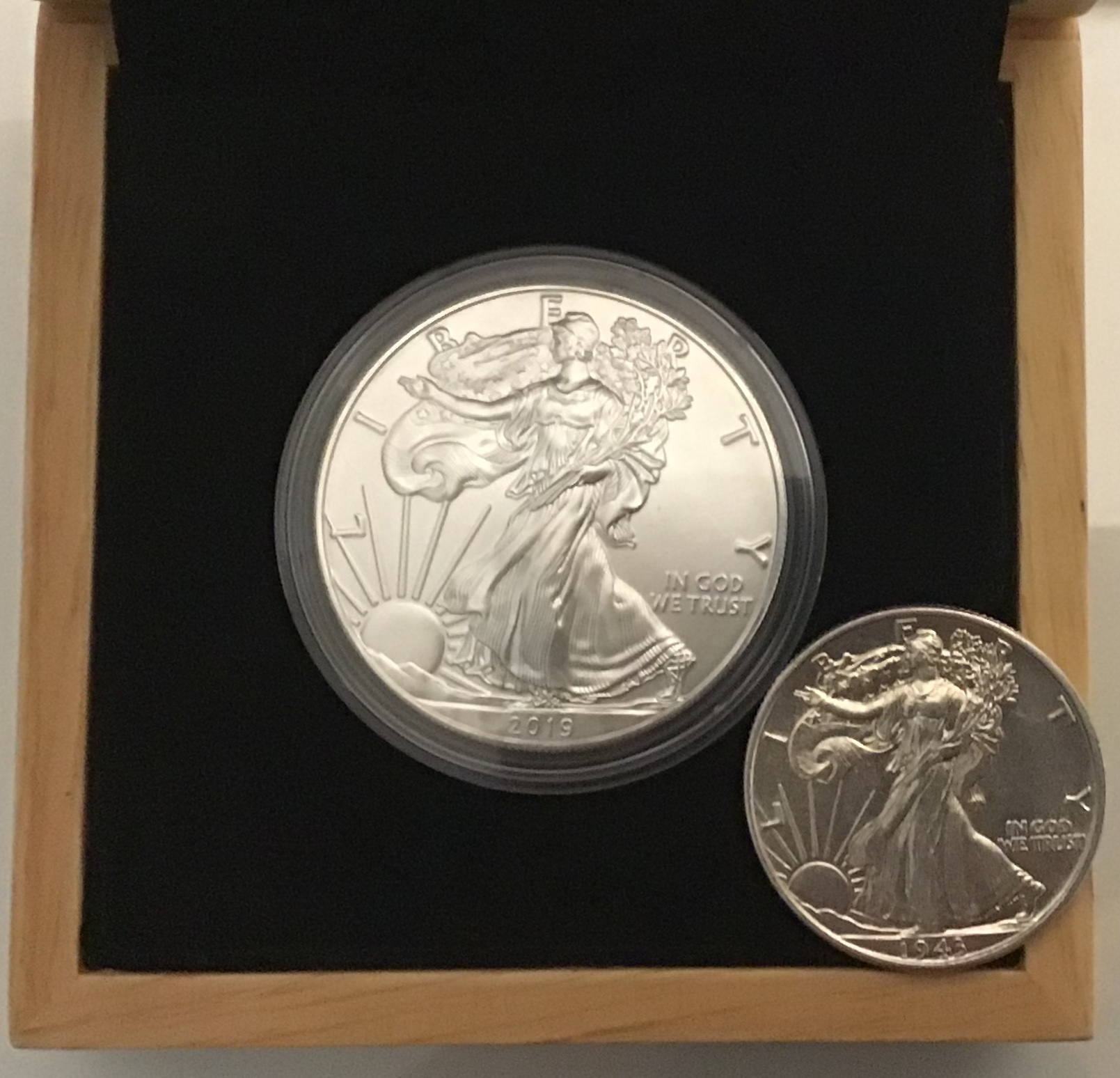
A 2019 American Silver Eagle bullion coin with a fineness of 999 (three nines fine), together with a Walking Liberty half dollar with a fineness of 900 (one nine fine); this latter alloy is also often referred to as 90% silver or coin silver.

- 999.99—five nines fine: The purest silver ever produced. This was achieved by the Royal Silver Company of Bolivia.
- 999.9—four nines fine: ultra-fine silver used by the Royal Canadian Mint for their Silver Maple Leaf and other silver coins
- 999—fine silver or three nines fine: Used in Good Delivery bullion bars and most silver bullion coins. Used in U.S. silver commemorative coins and silver proof coins starting in 2019.
- 980: common standard used in Mexico c. 1930–1945
- 958: (23/24) Britannia silver
- 950: French 1st Standard
- 947.9: 91 zolotnik Russian silver
- 935: Swiss standard for watchcases after 1887, to meet the British Merchandise Marks Act and to be of equal grade to 925 sterling. Sometimes claimed to have arisen as a Swiss misunderstanding of the standard required for British sterling. Usually marked with three Swiss bears. Used in the Art Deco period in Austria and Germany. Scandinavian silver jewelers used 935 silver after the 2nd World War.
- 933: Bolivian pesos bolivianos in 1975.
- 925: (37/40) Sterling silver. The UK has used this alloy from the early 12th century. Equivalent to plata de primera ley in Spain (first law silver). The standard used for English coinage from the time of Edward I until 1920. Widely used in the manufacture of silver items, including flatware, jewelry, musical instruments, home decor, etc.
- 917: a standard used for minting Indian silver (rupees), during the British raj and for some coins during the first Brazilian Republic.
- 916: 88 zolotnik Russian silver (actually 91.66%)
- 903: Mexican Reals between 1823 and 1897 and Pesos 1910 to 1940; Bolivian Soles 1827–1859.
- 900: one nine fine, coin silver, or 90% silver: e.g. Flowing Hair and 1837–1964 U.S. silver coins. Also used in U.S. silver commemorative coins and silver proof coins 1982–2018. Also used in coins from Spain, Russia, China, Argentina, Germany, Switzerland, Italy, Yugoslavia, Czechoslovakia, Hungary, Japan, Egypt, Turkey, Lebanon, Israel, and Panama. Commonly used in American cutlery before about 1870. Also used in European, Middle Eastern, North African, Mexican, and South and Central American jewelry.
- 892.4: US coinage 1485/1664 fine "standard silver" as defined by the Coinage Act of 1792: e.g. Draped Bust and Capped Bust U.S. silver coins (1795–1836)
- 875: 84 zolotnik is the most common fineness for Russian silver. Swiss standard, commonly used for export watchcases (also 800 and later 935). Also used in silver from the Baltic States, Finland, Poland, Switzerland, and Romania. Commonly found in jewelry and other silver items produced in the Soviet Union.
- 868: 83 1/3 zolotnik. Imperial Russian coinage between 1797 and 1885.
- 835: A standard predominantly used in Germany after 1884, and for some Dutch silver; and for the minting of coins in countries of the Latin Monetary Union
- 833: (5/6) a common standard for continental silver especially among the Dutch, Swedish, and Germans. Standard used in the very widespread Maria Theresa Thaler from 1780 to the present. Some Bolivian centavos in 1909.
- 830: A common standard used in older Scandinavian silver
- 800: The minimum standard for silver in Germany after 1884; the French 2nd standard for silver; "plata de segunda ley" in Spain (second law silver); Egyptian silver; Swedish silver; Canadian silver circulating coinage from 1920 to 1966/7 Used for the outer cladding of US half dollars between 1965 and 1970, and commemorative issue Eisenhower dollars between 1971 and 1978 (cores are 20.9% silver).
- 750: An uncommon silver standard found in older German, Swiss and Austro-Hungarian silver
- 720: Decoplata: many Mexican and Dutch silver coins use this standard, as well as some coins from Portugal's former colonies, Japan, Uruguay, Ecuador, Egypt, Mexico, and Morocco.
- 700: Chile 50 Centavos 1902–1905
- 600: Used in some examples of postwar Japanese coins, such as the 1957-1966 100 yen coin. Also used in older Swedish coins.
- 500: Standard used for British coinage 1920–1946 as well as Canadian circulating coins from 1967 to 1968 and commemoratives from 1971 to 1991 and some coins from Colombia and Brazil. Also used on some Peruvian and Soviet coins of the 1920s and 30s. Large Panamanian 20 balboas coins were also minted at this fineness from 1980 to 1985
- 450: Chile Centavos 1915–1919
- 420: Used for Mexico 50 Centavos in 1935
- 400: Some Swedish coins; early 1900s Chile centavos
- 350: Standard used for US Jefferson "war nickels" minted between 1942 and 1945.
- 300: Used for Mexico 50 Centavos 1950–1951
- 100: Used for Mexican pesos 1957–1967.

== Carat ==
The carat (UK spelling, symbol c or Ct) or karat (US spelling, symbol k or Kt) is a fractional measure of purity for gold alloys, in parts fine per 24 parts whole. The carat system is a standard adopted by US federal law.

=== Mass ===
C = 24 × (M_{g} / M_{m})

where

- C is the carat rating of the material,
- M_{g} is the mass of pure gold in the alloy, and
- M_{m} is the total mass of the material.

24-carat gold is pure (while 100% purity is very difficult to attain, 24-carat as a designation is permitted in commerce for a minimum of 99.95% purity), 18-carat gold is 18 parts gold, 6 parts another metal (forming an alloy with 75% gold), 12-carat gold is 12 parts gold (12 parts another metal), and so forth.

In Britain, the carat was divisible into four grains, and the grain was divisible into four quarts. For example, a gold alloy of 127/128 fineness (that is, 99.2% purity) could have been described as being 23-carat, 3-grain, 1-quart gold.

The carat fractional system is increasingly being complemented or superseded by the millesimal system, described above for bullion, though jewelry generally tends to still use the carat system.

Conversion between percentage of pure gold and karats:

- 58.33–62.50% = 14 c (nominally 58.33%)
- 75.00–79.16% = 18 c (nominally 75.00%)
- 91.66–95.83% = 22 c (nominally 91.66%)
- 95.83–99.95% = 23 c (nominally 95.83%)
- 99.95–100% = 24 c (nominally 99.95%)

=== Volume ===
However, this system of calculation gives only the mass of pure gold contained in an alloy. The term 18-carat gold means that the alloy's mass consists of 75% of gold and 25% of other metals. The quantity of gold by volume in a less-than-24-carat gold alloy differs according to the alloys used. For example, knowing that standard 18-carat yellow gold consists of 75% gold, 12.5% silver and the remaining 12.5% of copper (all by mass), the volume of pure gold in this alloy will be 60% since gold is much denser than the other metals used: 19.32 g/cm^{3} for gold, 10.49 g/cm^{3} for silver and 8.96 g/cm^{3} for copper.

=== Density ===
To find approximate metal purity divide the weight of your metal (dry weight) by the weight after it's been submerged completely in water (wet weight) and check the density range.

$$\frac { \text{DW}} { \text{WW}} = DR$$

It is based on Archimedes' principle and the method he used in King Hiero II's crown. The metal must be completely submerged and held in place with a string or thread without touching the container.

Gold
Karat	Content	Alloyed metal			Density range (±1%)
Karat	Content	Copper	Copper and silver	Silver	Density range (±1%)
K24	1000/1000	19.32			19.31~19.51
K22	916/1000	17.63	17.73	18.06	17.45~18.24
K20	834/1000	16.19	16.42	16.94	16.03~17.11
K18	750/1000	14.99	15.24	15.96	14.84~16.12
K14	584/1000	13.04	13.38	14.30	12.91~14.44
K10	417/1000	11.54	11.91	12.96	11.42~13.09

=== Etymology ===
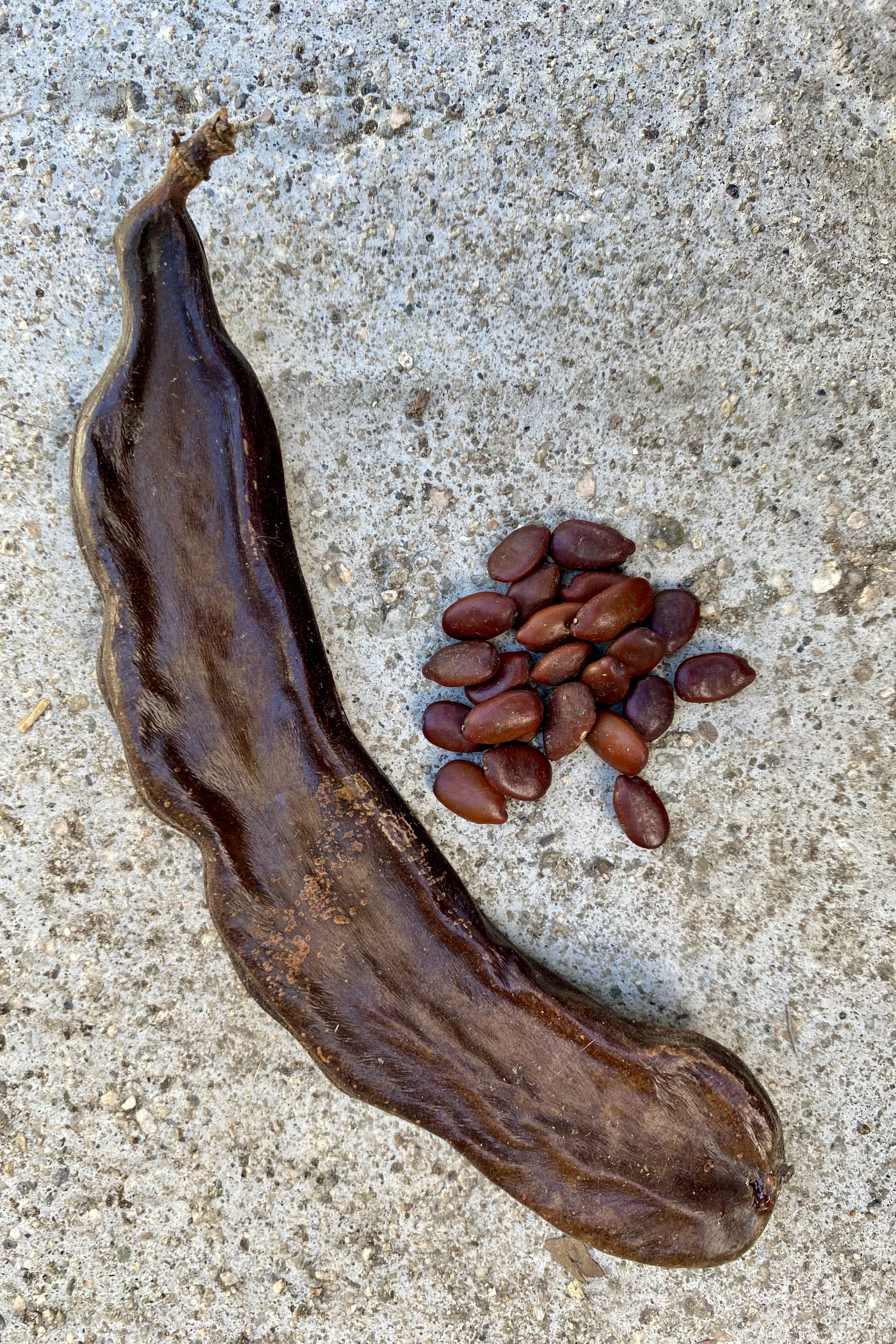
Carob (Ceratonia siliqua) pod and seeds, origin of carat via Arabic qīrāṭ which itself comes from the Greek word for the seed kerátion

Karat is a variant of carat. First attested in English in the mid-15th century, the word carat came from Middle French carat, in turn derived either from Italian carato or Medieval Latin carratus. These were borrowed into Medieval Europe from the Arabic qīrāṭ meaning "fruit of the carob tree", also "weight of 5 grains", (قيراط) and was a unit of mass though it was probably not used to measure gold in classical times. The Arabic term ultimately originates from the Greek kerátion (κεράτιον) meaning carob seed (literally "small horn") (diminutive of κέρας – kéras, "horn").

In 309 AD, Roman Emperor Constantine I began to mint a new gold coin, the solidus, that was 1/72 of a libra (Roman pound) of gold equal to a mass of 24 siliquae, where each siliqua (or carat) was 1/1728 of a libra. This is believed to be the origin of the value of the karat.

== Verifying fineness ==
While there are many methods of detecting fake precious metals, there are realistically only two options available for verifying the marked fineness of metal as being reasonably accurate: assaying the metal (which requires destroying it), or using X-ray fluorescence (XRF). XRF will measure only the outermost portion of the piece of metal and so may get misled by thick plating.

That becomes a concern because it would be possible for an unscrupulous refiner to produce precious metals bars that are slightly less pure than marked on the bar. A refiner doing $1 billion of business each year that marked .980 pure bars as .999 fine would make about an extra $20 million in profit. In the United States, the actual purity of gold articles must be no more than .003 less than the marked purity (e.g. .996 fine for gold marked .999 fine), and the actual purity of silver articles must be no more than .004 less than the marked purity.

== Fine weight ==
A piece of alloy metal containing a precious metal may also have the weight of its precious component referred to as its "fine weight". For example, 1 troy ounce of 18 karat gold (which is 75% gold) may be said to have a fine weight of 0.75 troy ounces.

Most modern government-issued bullion coins specify their fine weight. For example, the American Gold Eagle is embossed One Oz. Fine Gold and weighs 1.091 troy oz.

== Troy mass of silver content ==
Fineness of silver in Britain was traditionally expressed as the mass of silver expressed in troy ounces and pennyweights (1/20 troy ounce) in one troy pound (12 troy ounces) of the resulting alloy. Britannia silver has a fineness of 11 ounces, 10 pennyweights, or about $\frac{(11+\frac{10}{20})}{12} = 95.833\%$ silver, whereas sterling silver has a fineness of 11 ounces, 2 pennyweights, or exactly $\frac{(11+\frac{2}{20})}{12} = 92.5\%$ silver.

== See also ==
- Colored gold
- Electrum
- Nines (notation)
- Gold as an investment
- Gold coin
- Platinum coin
- Silver as an investment
- Silver coin
- Tumbaga
