= Line 9 =

Line 9 or 9 Line may refer to:

== Asia ==
=== China ===
- Line 9 (Beijing Subway), a subway line in Beijing
- Line 9 (Chengdu Metro), a metro line in Chengdu, Sichuan
- Line 9 (Chongqing Rail Transit), a metro line in Chongqing
- Line 9 (Guangzhou Metro), a metro line in Guangzhou, Guangdong
- Line 9 (Hangzhou Metro), a metro line in Hangzhou, Zhejiang
- Line 9 (Shanghai Metro), a metro line in Shanghai
- Line 9 (Shenyang Metro), a metro line in Shenyang, Liaoning
- Line 9 (Shenzhen Metro), a metro line in Shenzhen, Guangdong
- Line 9 (Tianjin Metro), a metro line in Tianjin
- Line 9 (Xi'an Metro), a metro line in Xi'an, Shaanxi

=== India ===
- Line 9 (Mumbai Metro)

=== Malaysia ===
- Kajang line, called Line 9 at route map

=== Philippines ===
- Metro Manila Subway Line 9, Metro Manila

=== South Korea ===
- Seoul Subway Line 9, a subway line in Seoul

== Europe ==
=== France ===
- Paris Metro Line 9, one of 16 metro lines in Paris

=== Italy ===
- Line 9 (Naples Metro), rapid transit railway line that forms part of the Metropolitana di Napoli

=== Russia ===
- Line 9 (Moscow Metro), a metro line of the Moscow Metro, Moscow

=== Spain ===
- Barcelona Metro line 9, one of the two branches of the Barcelona metro extension line 9/10
- Line 9 (Madrid Metro)

== North America ==
=== Mexico ===
- Mexico City Metro Line 9, a rapid transit line in Mexico City

=== United States ===
- 9 (New York City Subway service)
- Route 9 (Baltimore), a bus route
- 9 (Los Angeles Railway)

== South America ==
=== Brazil ===
- Line 9 (CPTM), São Paulo

=== Chile ===
- Santiago Metro Line 9, a planned railway line

== Oceania ==
=== Australia ===
- T9 Northern Line, Sydney Trains service

== See also ==
- List of public transport routes numbered 9
