= The Nines (band) =

- Origin: Oakville, Ontario, Canada
- Genres: Power pop
- Years active: 1992–present
- Label: TAS GOLD / Page Music / EMI / Universal / Airmail Recordings / Sony Music Japan
- Members: Steve Eggers; Paul McCulloch; Warren Cliff; Aaron Nielsen; Andrew Webb; Sam Tallo
- Website: reverbnation.com/thenines

The Nines is a Canadian power pop band formed in Oakville, Ontario, in 1991. The core of the band is multi-instrumentalist, vocalist and primary songwriter Steve Eggers. A series of other band members have rotated in and out through the years, including:Aaron Nielsen (the original drummer), Andrew Webb (the original guitar player) and Sam Tallo (guitar), Paul McCulloch (strings and bass) Bill Majoros, backing vocals and horn player). Several Nines/Eggers songs have been included on network television series, including Dawson's Creek, Party of Five, and Joan of Arcadia. Eggers also wrote the theme song for Global's comedy sitcom The Jane Show.

The Nines have been described in reviews as a band that has picked up where The Beatles left off.

== History ==
The first Nines album, Wonderworld of Colourful, was released in Canada in 1998 on the Page Music label and was distributed through EMI. Later that year, Universal Music Canada released a piano-based four-song EP. Eggers admits that the band was still a "work in progress" at this time.

Properties of Sound was released in North America in 2001. Airmail Recordings picked up the album in Japan a year later and released it there with bonus tracks and sold with six packs of kraft dinner.

While essentially a studio project, the band has performed live and has shared the stage with a diverse group of artists including, Ron Sexsmith, Vince Neil of Mötley Crüe, Supertramp's Roger Hodgson, the Jim Rose Side Show, and the Barenaked Ladies. Steve Eggers has gone on to work with a number of songwriters, including Andy Partridge of the British band XTC, and Jason Falkner, former member of the band Jellyfish. In 2015, the Nines released the movie soundtrack Night Surfer and the Cassette Kids and Alejandro's Visions featuring Bill Majoros of the band the Foreign Films. The Nines' released, Colour Radio (American Transistor) in 2017 to critical acclaim. In the summer of 2019 Eggers recorded a "solo" album, Shipwrecked (Eggers Songbook Vol 1), under the Nines moniker, playing all the instruments and doing all of the singing and production on that album.

Sony Music released The Nines' Gran Jukle's Field with an additional singles collection in Japan in December 2019. In 2020, the Nines' label T.A.S Gold released their album Reflections globally.

In 2025, the Nines released their first album in 5 years Echoes of Past Future to rave reviews with an additional 3 songs with the CD purchase.

== Discography ==
| Released | Album |
|---|---|
| 1998 | Wonderworld of Colourful |
| 1999 | Four Song EP |
| 2001 | Properties of Sound |
| 2002 | Properties of Sound (Japanese Import) |
| 2006 | Calling Distance Stations |
| 2007 | Gran Jukle's Field |
| 2007 | Winter Snow & Icicles |
| 2011 | Polarities |
| 2013 | The Nines |
| 2014 | Nine Lives |
| 2015 | Night Surfer and the cassette kids (original soundtrack) |
| 2015 | Circles in the snow (tapes and transcripts vol.1) |
| 2015 | Rare cuts and unreleased |
| 2016 | Alejandro's Visions |
| 2017 | Colour Radio (American Transistor) |
| 2019 | Shipwrecked (Eggers Songbook Vol 1) |
| 2019 | Gran Jukle's Field (Japanese version) + Bonus singles (SONY MUSIC JAPAN) |
| 2020 | Reflections |
| 2025 | Echoes of Past Future |

== Awards ==
- 1998 Best Unsigned Band North by Northeast Conference

The band was third place in a battle of four bands at the CHMR (the in house, at the time, radio station of Hamilton's Mohawk College campus: now known as 101.5 the Hawk) contest in 1994.
