= Number nine =

Number nine may refer to:

- 9 (number), natural number
- Number Nine, Arkansas, a community in the United States
- Nine (Sault album), a 2021 album by British band Sault
- Number Nine (novel), a 1951 novel by A.P. Herbert
- Number Nine (album), by Chris Hülsbeck
- No. 9 (album), by Wende (2009)
- Number 9 Audio Group, a recording studio located in Toronto, Ontario, Canada
- Number Nine Visual Technology, a computer hardware manufacturer whose primary business was video cards
- New Mexico No. 9, or No. 9, a chile pepper cultivar
- #9, the flagship beer of Magic Hat Brewing Company
- Number nine, repeated phrase on the Beatles recorded composition "Revolution 9"
- "Number 9", a song by Korean Girl Group T-ara on their EP Again
- Number (N)ine, a Japanese fashion brand found in Tokyo in 1996
- Number Nine, assistant to Jenny Jump in the Oz books by John R. Neill
- Number 9, the shirt number often worn by an association football team's centre forward
- Gordie Howe (1928–2016), Detroit Red Wings hockey player, frequently referred to by his sweater number, number 9
- Bobby Hull (1939–2023), Chicago Black Hawks hockey player, frequently referred to by his sweater number, number 9
- Maurice Richard (1921–2000), Canadiens hockey player, frequently referred to by his sweater number, number 9
- False 9 or False Number 9, a term used to describe an unconventional association football lone striker or centre-forward, who drops deep into midfield
- Mighty No. 9, a 2016 video game by Comcept

== See also ==
- 9 (disambiguation)
