= List of public transport routes numbered 9 =

In public transport, Route 9 may refer to:

== Spain ==
- Barcelona Metro line 9
- Line 9 (Madrid Metro)

== United Kingdom ==
- London Buses route 9

== United States ==
- 9 (New York City Subway service)
- 9 - Mayfield (Cleveland RTA), a bus route in Cleveland
- Route 9 (MTA Maryland), a bus route in the suburbs of Baltimore, Maryland

== See also ==
- Line 9 (disambiguation)
