= Volkswagen Polo Mk4 =

Supermini car

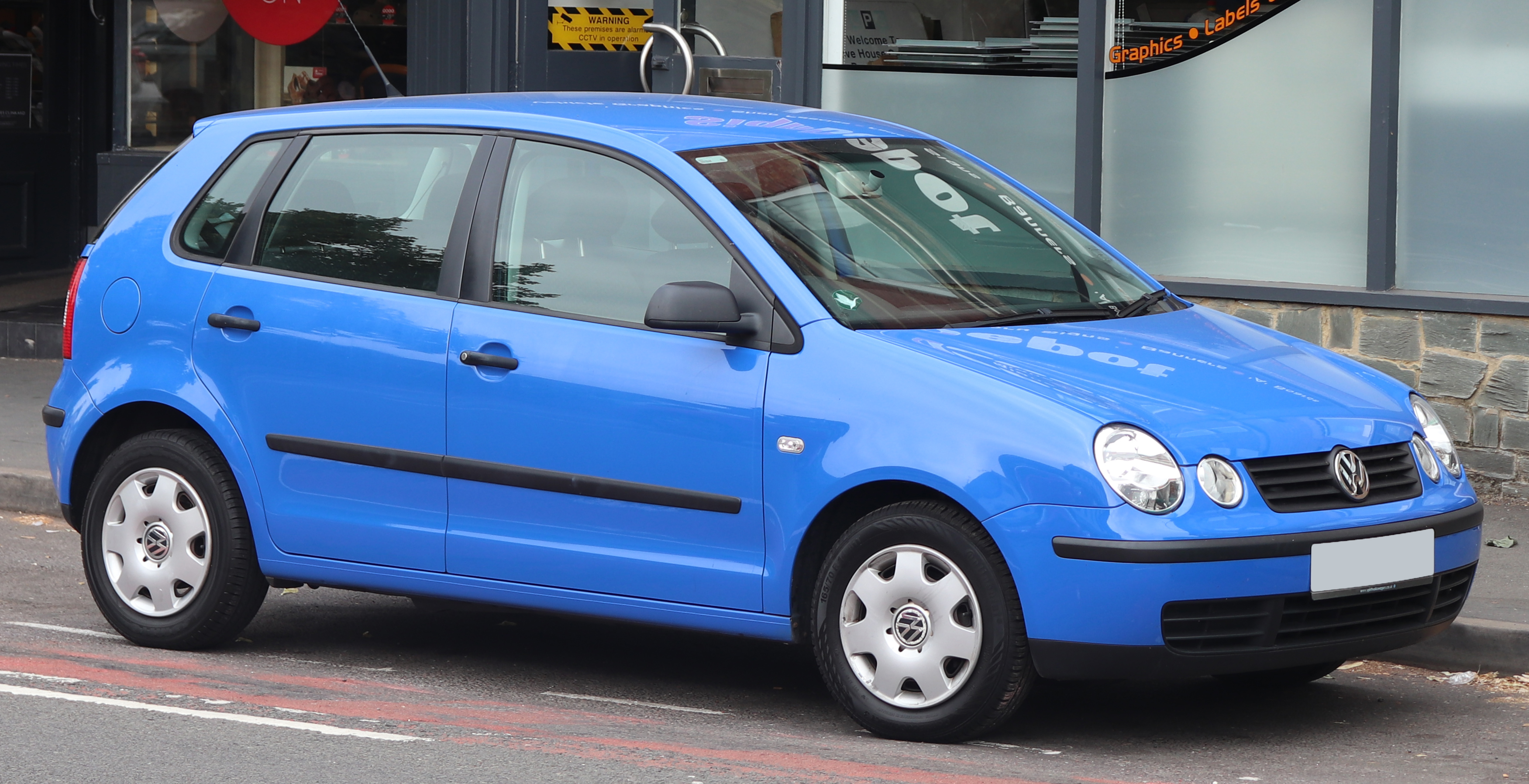

Overview
- Manufacturer: Volkswagen
- Also called: Volkswagen Polo Vivo (South Africa)
- Production: October 2001 – May 2009 (Germany); April 2002 – December 2014 (Brazil) 2002–2017 (South Africa)
- Assembly: Germany: Wolfsburg; Angola: Luanda (Ancar); Belgium: Brussels; Brazil: São Bernardo do Campo; China: Anting (SAIC-VW); Kenya: Thika (KVM: Polo Vivo); Slovakia: Bratislava; South Africa: Uitenhage; Spain: Pamplona

Body and chassis
- Class: Supermini (B)
- Body style: 3-door hatchback 5-door hatchback 4-door saloon
- Layout: Front-engine, front-wheel-drive
- Platform: Volkswagen Group A04 (PQ24)
- Related: SEAT Ibiza Mk3; SEAT Córdoba Mk2; Škoda Fabia Mk1; Škoda Fabia Mk2; Škoda Roomster; Volkswagen Fox

Powertrain
- Engine: petrol: 1.2 L I3 6v/12v; 1.4 L I4 16v; 1.4 L I4 FSi; 1.6 L I4 16v; 1.8 L turbo I4 20v; 2.0 L I4 8v; diesel: 1.4 L TDI PD I3 6v; 1.9 L SDI I4 8v; 1.9 L TDI PD I4 8v
- Transmission: 5-speed manual 6-speed manual 4-speed automatic 6-speed Tiptronic automatic

Dimensions
- Wheelbase: Saloon: 2,465 mm (97.0 in); 2002–07 3-door: 2,460 mm (96.9 in); 2008–09 5-door: 2,454 mm (96.6 in)
- Length: Saloon: 4,198 mm (165.3 in); 2002–04 5-door: 3,897 mm (153.4 in); 2005–07 5-door: 3,926 mm (154.6 in); 2008–09 5-door: 3,916 mm (154.2 in)
- Width: 1,650 mm (65.0 in)
- Height: Saloon: 1,501 mm (59.1 in); 2002–07 Hatchbacks: 1,465 mm (57.7 in); 2008–09 5-door: 1,467 mm (57.8 in); 2008–09 3-door: 1,452 mm (57.2 in)

Chronology
- Predecessor: Volkswagen Polo Mk3
- Successor: Volkswagen Polo Mk5

The Volkswagen Polo Mk4 is the fourth generation of the Volkswagen Polo supermini car produced by the German manufacturer Volkswagen. It was marketed from early 2002 to 2010 in most countries where Volkswagen manufactured except Argentina and the USA. It was manufactured in South Africa until 2017, where it was sold as the Polo Vivo. The Mk4 replaced the Volkswagen Polo Mk3, while the Polo Vivo replaced the Citi Golf. In 2018, the Mk4 was replaced by the Mk5 Polo Vivo in South Africa. In Brazil, it was manufactured until 2014, receiving a second facelift called 9N4. The Mk5 was skipped in Brazil; after a brief hiatus it was replaced by the Polo Mk6 in 2017.

== Overview ==
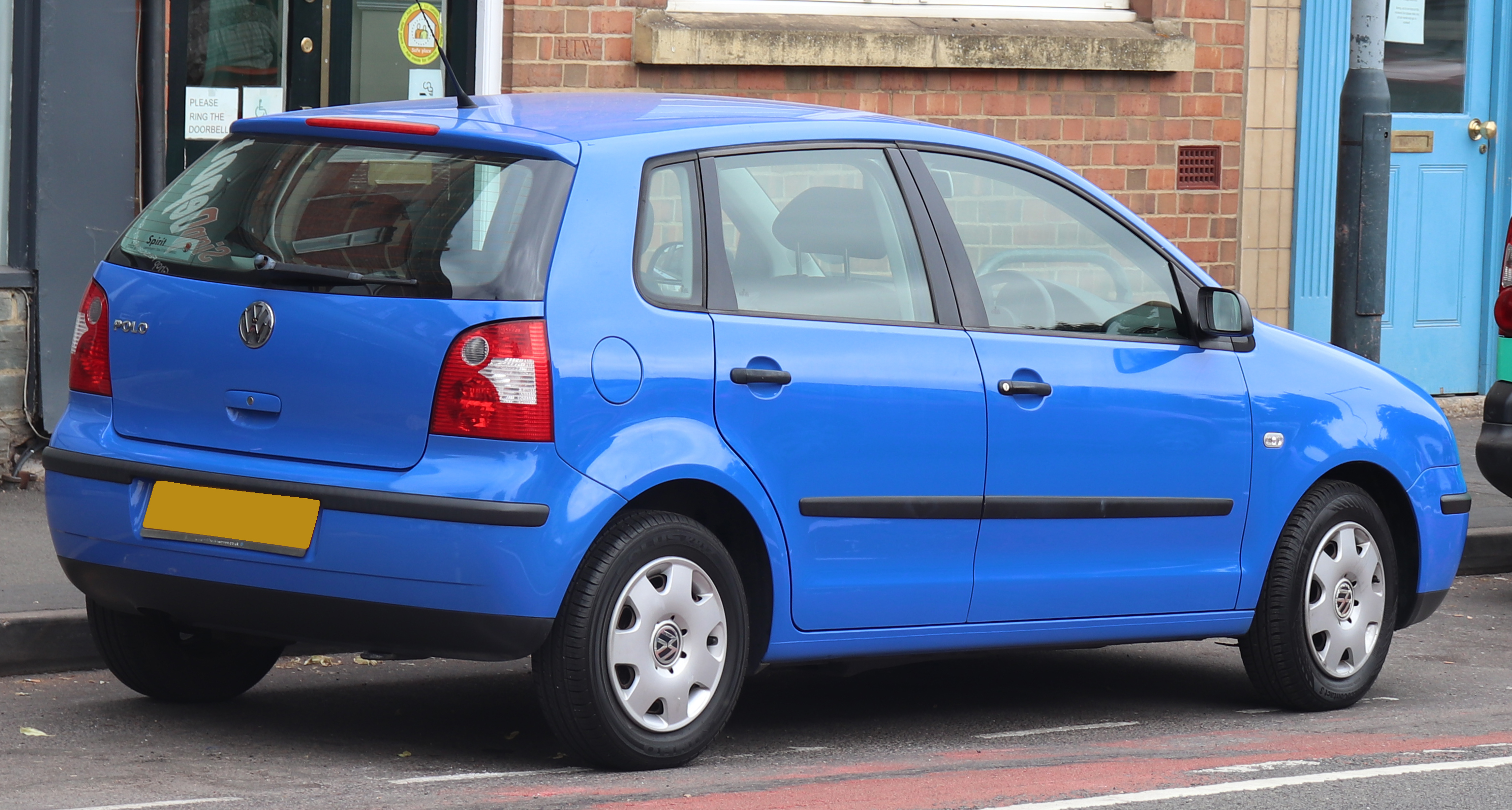
Pre-facelift Volkswagen Polo E (UK)

Launched in September 2001 at the Frankfurt Motor Show, the fourth generation Polo (internal designation Typ 9N) was made available in early 2002. In keeping with Volkswagen's aim of floor pan sharing, it shares its platform with the SEAT Ibiza 6L, SEAT Córdoba 6L, Volkswagen Gol Third Generation, also called G5 or N.F.—unrelated to Volkswagen Golf—and Škoda Fabia Mk1. The car differs from previous models, and bears more structural resemblance to the 6K than the 6N; outwardly the most recognizable change is the use of quad round headlights similar to the Volkswagen Lupo's.

The South African-built Polo Vivo is over 3,900 mm (153.5 in) long, longer than the first generation of its larger sibling the 3,820 mm (150.4 in)-long Volkswagen Golf Mk1.

== Release in North America ==
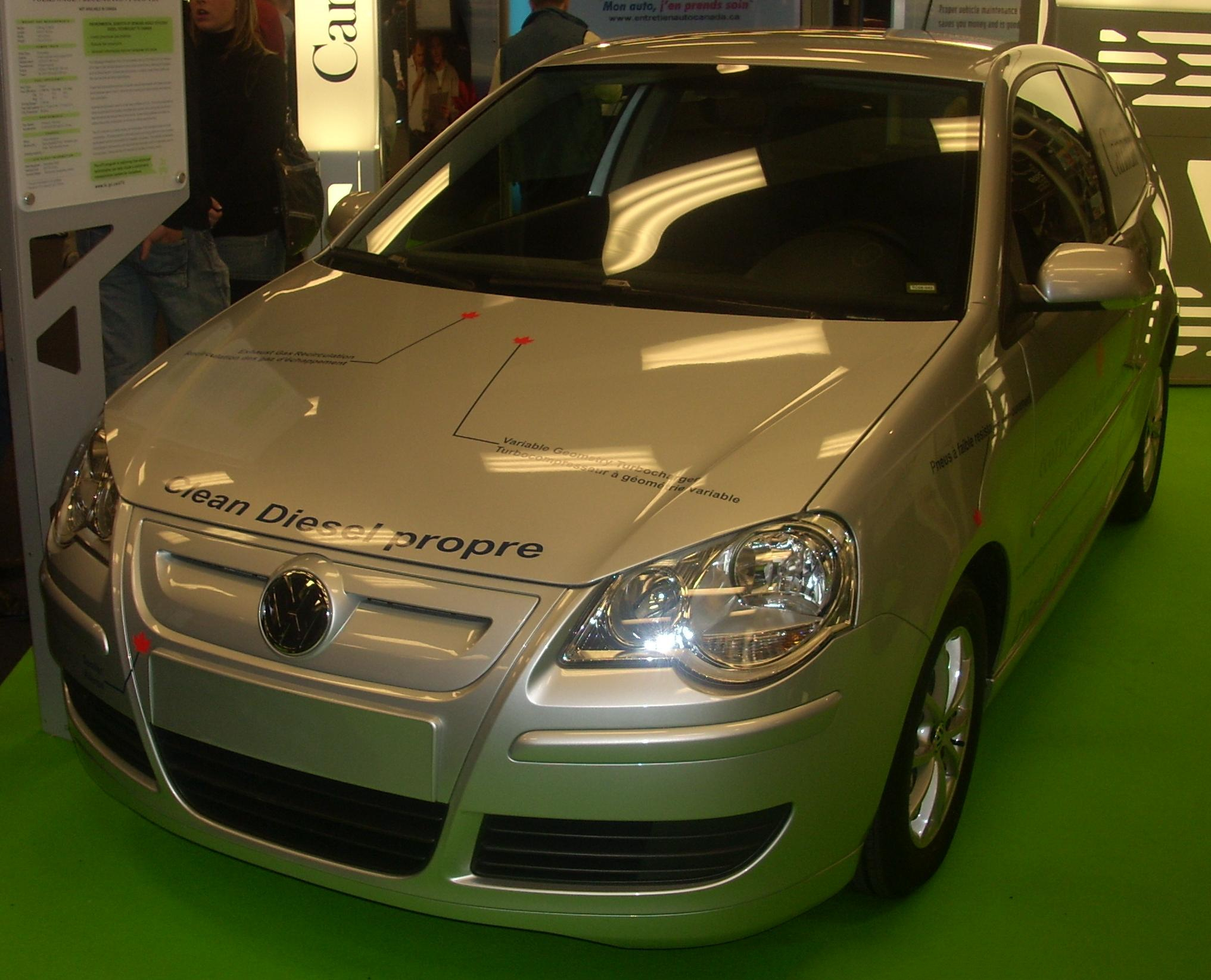
Volkswagen Polo clean diesel

In January 2009, Volkswagen Group of America CEO Stefan Jacoby announced that the Polo will finally reach North America to join the vehicle line-up as a true entry-level car below the Rabbit. However, the Polo Mk4 was never released in the North American market, leaving the speculation for its successor, the Polo Mk5. When the Mk5 was introduced in European markets, it was not made available for US sale. Due to the increased demand for SUVs, VWoA management confirmed the Mk5 was not slated for a US introduction in the foreseeable future. If the Mk5 had been introduced in the US, it was anticipated to be built at Volkswagen's plant in Puebla, Mexico, alongside the Jetta and New Beetle. As of 2016, there are still no plans to introduce the Polo Mk5 or future generations of the Polo in the US.

== Models and specifications ==
The model range includes the norm for current Volkswagen models, from the Comfortline to the Trendline and Highline, whilst featuring an extensive list of extras that had now become norm in mid-sized small cars. Items such as ABS, power steering, front and side airbags and front and rear head restraints were standard on all models and ESP, brake assistance, air conditioning, satellite navigation etc. were optional on higher spec models.

It is the first Polo generation to use a semi-automatic air conditioning system, with automatic climate control, named Climatic, that adjusts the interior temperature automatically to the value set on the control panel, whereas the air distribution and air blower speed are adjusted manually. A fully automatic air conditioning system, named Climatronic, was also offered.

It was available with a choice of a five-speed manual gearbox, a six-speed manual gearbox, only for the sporty 1.9-litre 130 PS (96 kW) diesel model, or with a four-speed automatic gearbox, used only in combination with the 1.4-litre 75 PS (55 kW) petrol engine. A six-speed automatic transmission with manual gear select function (Tiptronic) was added from mid-2006, after the facelift, also available only with the 1.4-litre 80 PS (59 kW) or with the 1.6-litre 105 PS (77 kW) petrol engines.

There was also a crossover version of the Polo, with off-road styling, named Polo Fun (Polo Dune in the UK, Polo Soho in Spain, CrossPolo in South Africa), released in 2003 - despite its appearance the car was never available with 4WD.

=== Engines ===
The Polo was available with several petrol and diesel engines: a 1.2 L three-cylinder petrol engine with 55 PS (40 kW; 54 hp) or 64 PS (47 kW; 63 hp) (depending on the number of valves per cylinder, two or four) and a 16-valve 1.4 L 4-cylinder with 75 PS (55 kW; 74 hp) or 100 PS (74 kW; 99 hp) petrol engine, the last one on the 16V-badged model.

The car was available with both turbocharged, and naturally aspirated diesel engines such as the 4-cylinder 1.9 L SDI (Suction Diesel Injection) with 64 PS (47 kW; 63 hp) but with 125 N⋅m (92 lb⋅ft) of torque, slightly more than some petrol powered units. As well as the non-turbocharged SDI engine, newer TDI PD turbodiesel units were available, these being a 1.9 L with 100 PS (74 kW; 99 hp) and a three-cylinder 1.4 L model (the 1.9 with one cylinder less) with 75 PS (55 kW; 74 hp). A sporty 1.9 TDI PD model, named Polo GT, was launched in 2004, with 130 PS (96 kW; 128 hp).

Petrol engines
Engine	Code	Type	Displacement	Power (Max output)	Torque (Max output)	Years	Top speed
1.2	AWY / BMD	I3 SOHC 6V, multi-point sequential fuel injection	1198 cc	55 PS (40 kW; 54 hp) at 4750 rpm	108 N⋅m (80 lb⋅ft) at 3000 rpm	2001–2007	152 km/h
1.2	BBM	I3 SOHC 6V, multi-point sequential fuel injection	1198 cc	60 PS (44 kW; 59 hp) at 5200 rpm	108 N⋅m (80 lb⋅ft) at 3000 rpm	2007–2009	157 km/h
1.2	AZQ / BME	I3 DOHC 12V, multi-point sequential fuel injection	1198 cc	64 PS (47 kW; 63 hp) at 5400 rpm	112 N⋅m (83 lb⋅ft) at 3000 rpm	2001–2007	162 km/h
1.2	BZG	I3 DOHC 12V, multi-point sequential fuel injection	1198 cc	70 PS (51 kW; 69 hp) at 5400 rpm	112 N⋅m (83 lb⋅ft) at 3000 rpm	2007–2009	167 km/h
1.4	AUA / BBY / BKY	I4 DOHC 16V, multi-point sequential fuel injection	1390 cc	75 PS (55 kW; 74 hp) at 5000 rpm	126 N⋅m (93 lb⋅ft) at 3800 rpm	2001–2007	172 km/h
1.4	BUD	I4 DOHC 16V, multi-point sequential fuel injection	1390 cc	80 PS (59 kW; 79 hp) at 5000 rpm	132 N⋅m (97 lb⋅ft) at 3800 rpm	2007–2009	175 km/h
1.4 FSI	AXU	I4 DOHC 16V, Fuel Stratified Injection	1390 cc	86 PS (63 kW; 85 hp) at 5000 rpm	130 N⋅m (96 lb⋅ft) at 3750 rpm	2002–2006	178 km/h
1.4	AUB / BBZ	I4 DOHC 16V, multi-point sequential fuel injection	1390 cc	101 PS (74 kW; 100 hp) at 6000 rpm	126 N⋅m (93 lb⋅ft) at 4400 rpm	2002–2006	188 km/h
1.6	BTS	I4 DOHC 16V, multi-point sequential fuel injection	1598 cc	105 PS (77 kW; 104 hp) at 5600 rpm	153 N⋅m (113 lb⋅ft) at 3800 rpm	2006–2009	192 km/h
1.8T GTI	BJX	I4 DOHC 20V, multi-point sequential fuel injection and turbocharger	1781 cc	150 PS (110 kW; 148 hp) at 5800 rpm	220 N⋅m (162 lb⋅ft) at 1900–4500 rpm	2006–2009	216 km/h
1.8T GTI Cup Edition	BBU	I4 DOHC 20V, multi-point sequential fuel injection and turbocharger	1781 cc	180 PS (132 kW; 178 hp) at 5800 rpm	235 N⋅m (173 lb⋅ft) at 2000–5000 rpm	2006–2009	225 km/h

Diesel engines
Engine	Code	Type	Displacement	Power (Max output)	Torque (Max output)	Years	Top speed
1.4 TDI	BNM / BWB	I3 SOHC 6V, Pumpe Düse (PD) injectors; optional diesel particulate filter (DPF)	1422 cc	70 PS (51 kW; 69 hp) at 4000 rpm	200 N⋅m (148 lb⋅ft) at 1600–2800 rpm	2005–2009	190 km/h
1.4 TDI	AMF / BAY	I3 SOHC 6V, Pumpe Düse (PD) injectors	1422 cc	75 PS (55 kW; 74 hp) at 4000 rpm	195 N⋅m (144 lb⋅ft) at 2200 rpm	2001–2005	170 km/h
1.4 TDI	BNV / BMS	I3 SOHC 6V, Pumpe Düse (PD) injectors; optional diesel particulate filter (DPF)	1422 cc	80 PS (59 kW; 79 hp) at 4000 rpm	195 N⋅m (144 lb⋅ft) at 2200 rpm	2005–2009	174 km/h
1.9 SDI	ASY	I4 SOHC 8V, distributor-type injection pump	1896 cc	64 PS (47 kW; 63 hp) at 4000 rpm	125 N⋅m (92 lb⋅ft) at 1600–2800 rpm	2001–2005	160 km/h
1.9 TDI	ATD / AXR / BMT	I4 SOHC 8V, Pumpe Düse (PD) injectors; optional diesel particulate filter (DPF)	1896 cc	101 PS (74 kW; 100 hp) at 4000 rpm	240 N⋅m (177 lb⋅ft) at 1800–2400 rpm	2001–2009	188 km/h
1.9 TDI	ASZ / BLT	I4 SOHC 8V, Pumpe Düse (PD) injectors	1896 cc	130 PS (96 kW; 128 hp) at 4000 rpm	310 N⋅m (229 lb⋅ft) at 1900 rpm	2003–2009	206 km/h

=== Sedan ===
A saloon version was launched in November 2003. It was produced in Brazil, South Africa and China and exported to the rest of Latin America, Australia, and Europe. With the introduction of the Polo Classic saloon in the Australian market in 2004, the Chinese version was the first Chinese-built car produced in right-hand drive.

Compared to the hatchback model, the Polo Sedan (also "Saloon" or "Limousine") is completely re-styled from the B-pillar rearwards. The window line has a slight upward incline and the roof features Volkswagen's trademark curves and the concise styling of the C-pillar provides aspects that are actually reminiscent of a coupe. At the rear, the large horizontally divided rear lights and sculptured panels complete a design that is classically Volkswagen.

Overall, the Polo Sedan is 28 centimetres longer than the hatchback version (4179 mm vs 3897 mm). Consequently, with the rear seatback in place, the Polo Sedan offers 461 Litres of boot capacity (211 litres more than the hatchback siblings), and with the rear seats folded down 1127 litres of storage capacity are available.

Under the bonnet is Volkswagen's 1.6-litre multi-valve engine that delivers 101 hp (75 kW) of power at 5500 rpm and peak torque of 140 N⋅m (103 lb⋅ft) at 3250 rpm. Transmission is a five-speed manual.

Standard features including dual front and side airbags, semi-automatic air conditioning, CD player, ABS brakes and remote central locking with engine immobiliser.

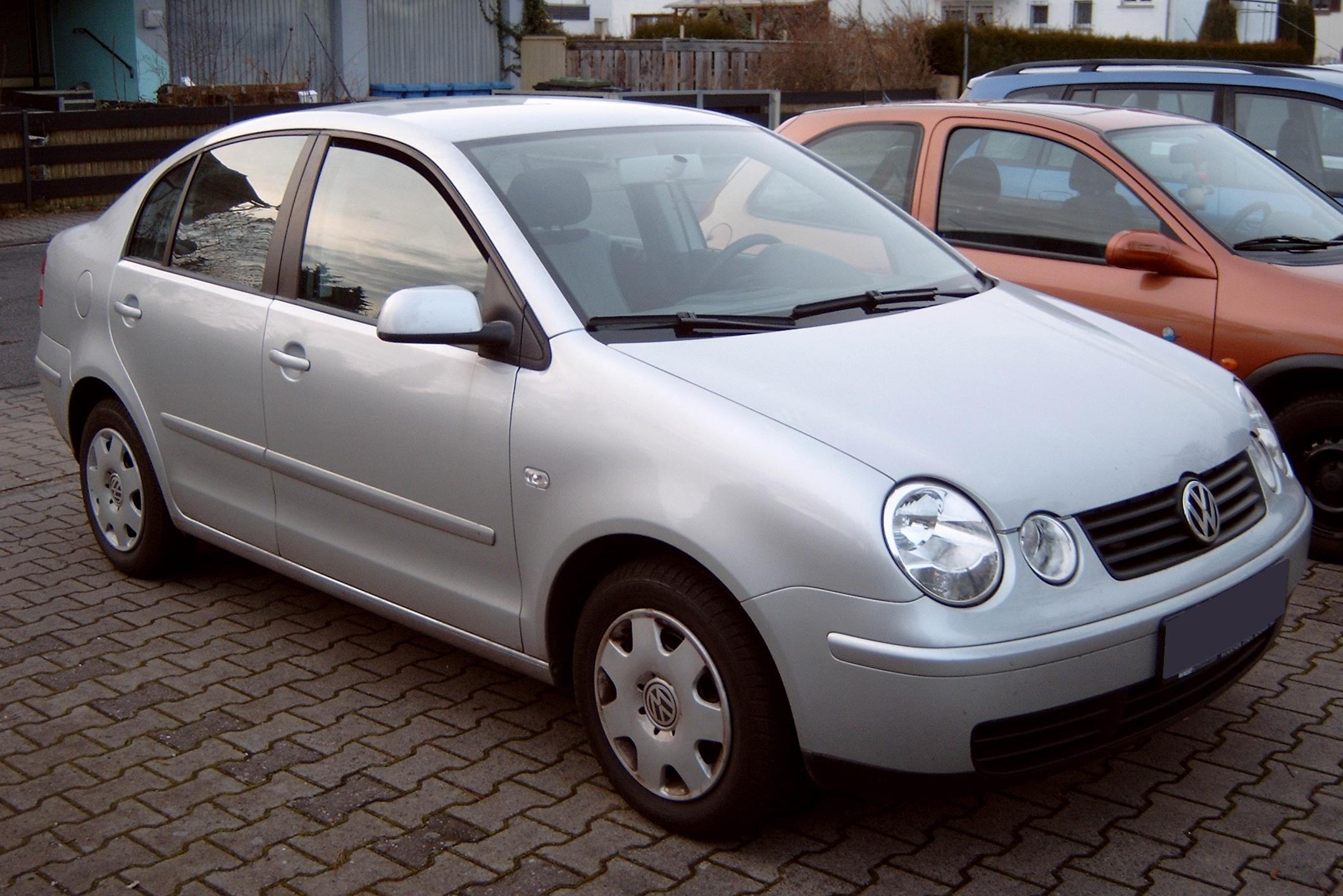
Volkswagen Polo MK4 pre-facelift

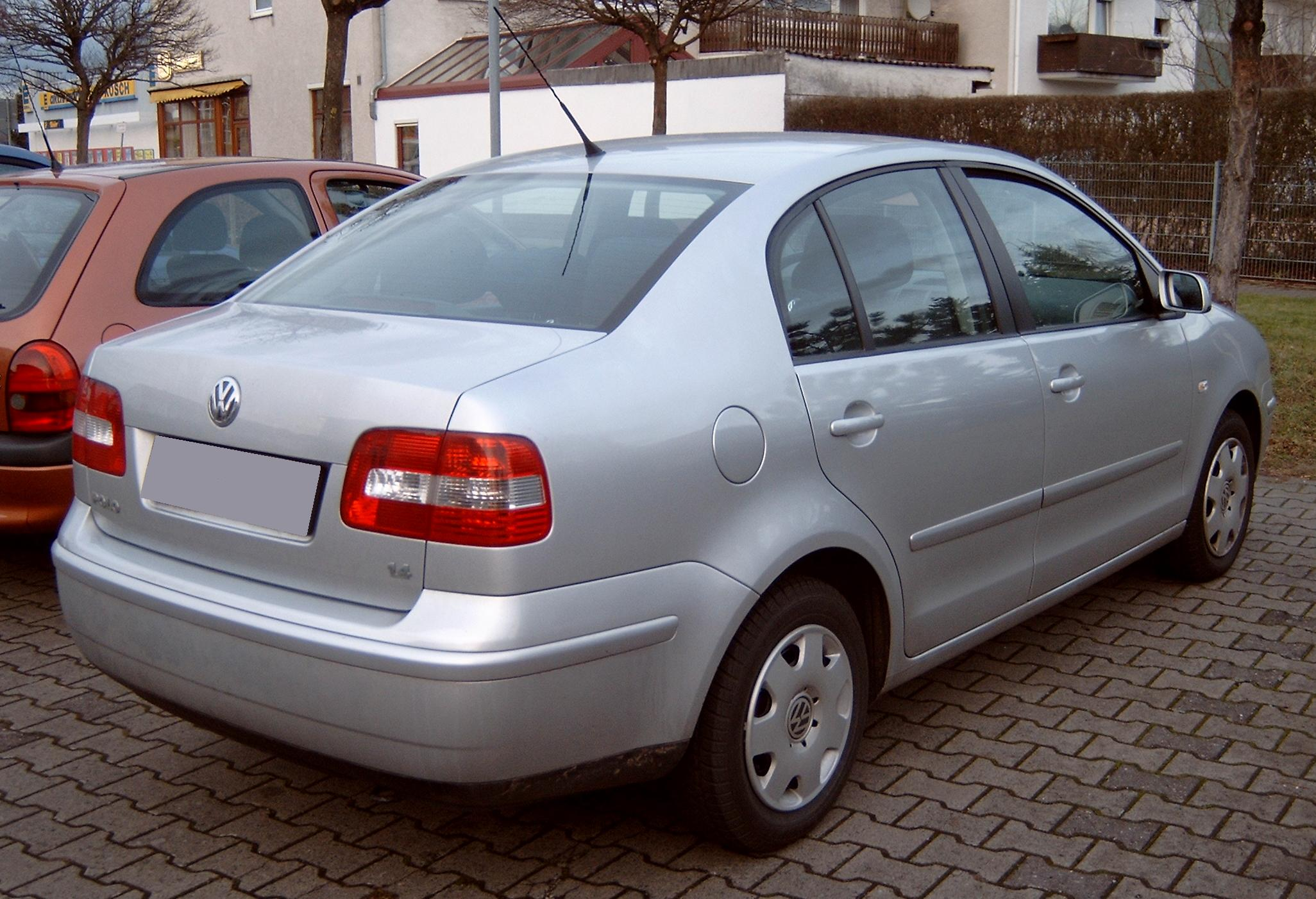
Volkswagen Polo MK4 sedan pre-facelift (rear)

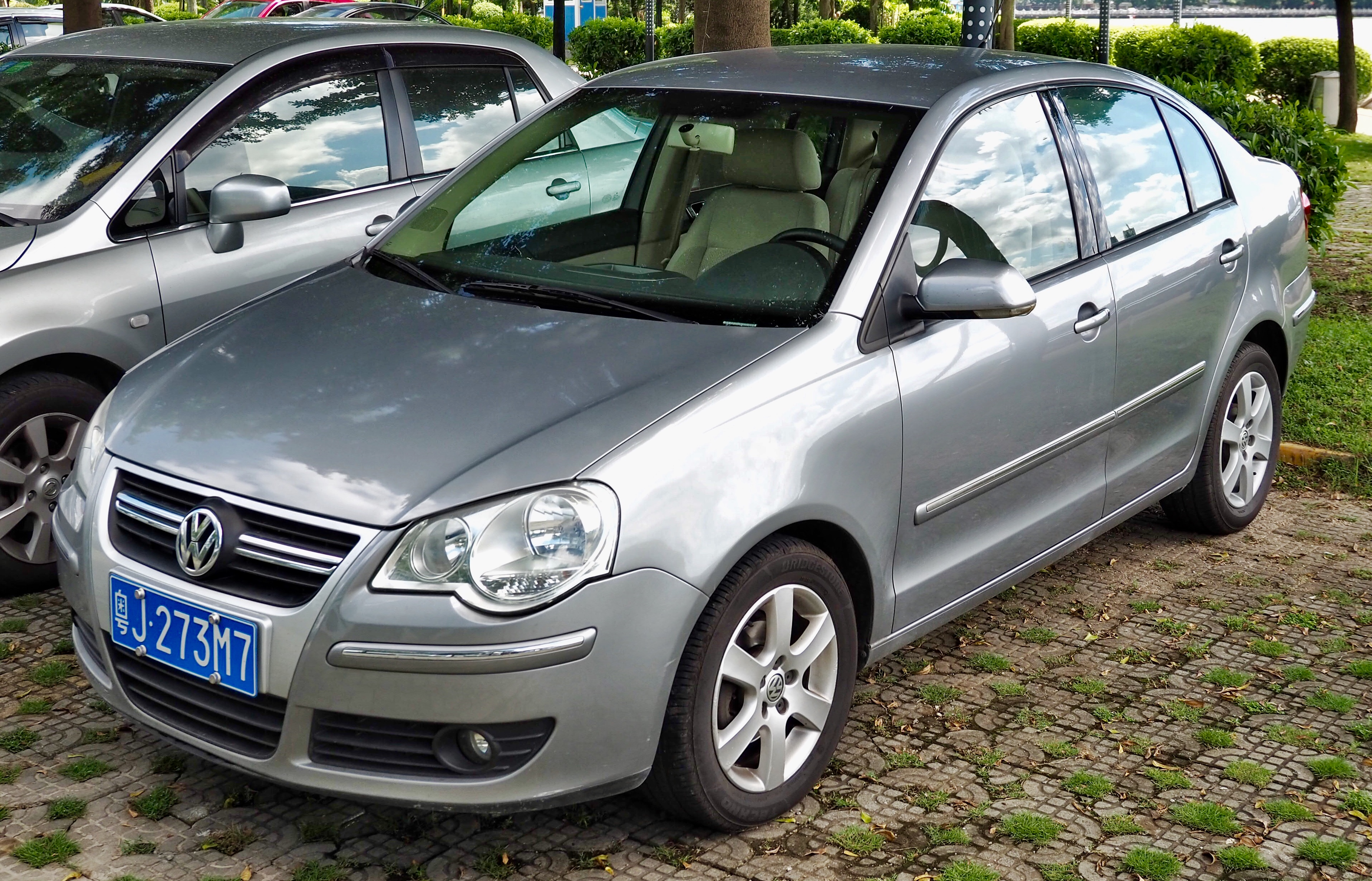
Volkswagen Polo MK4 sedan first facelift

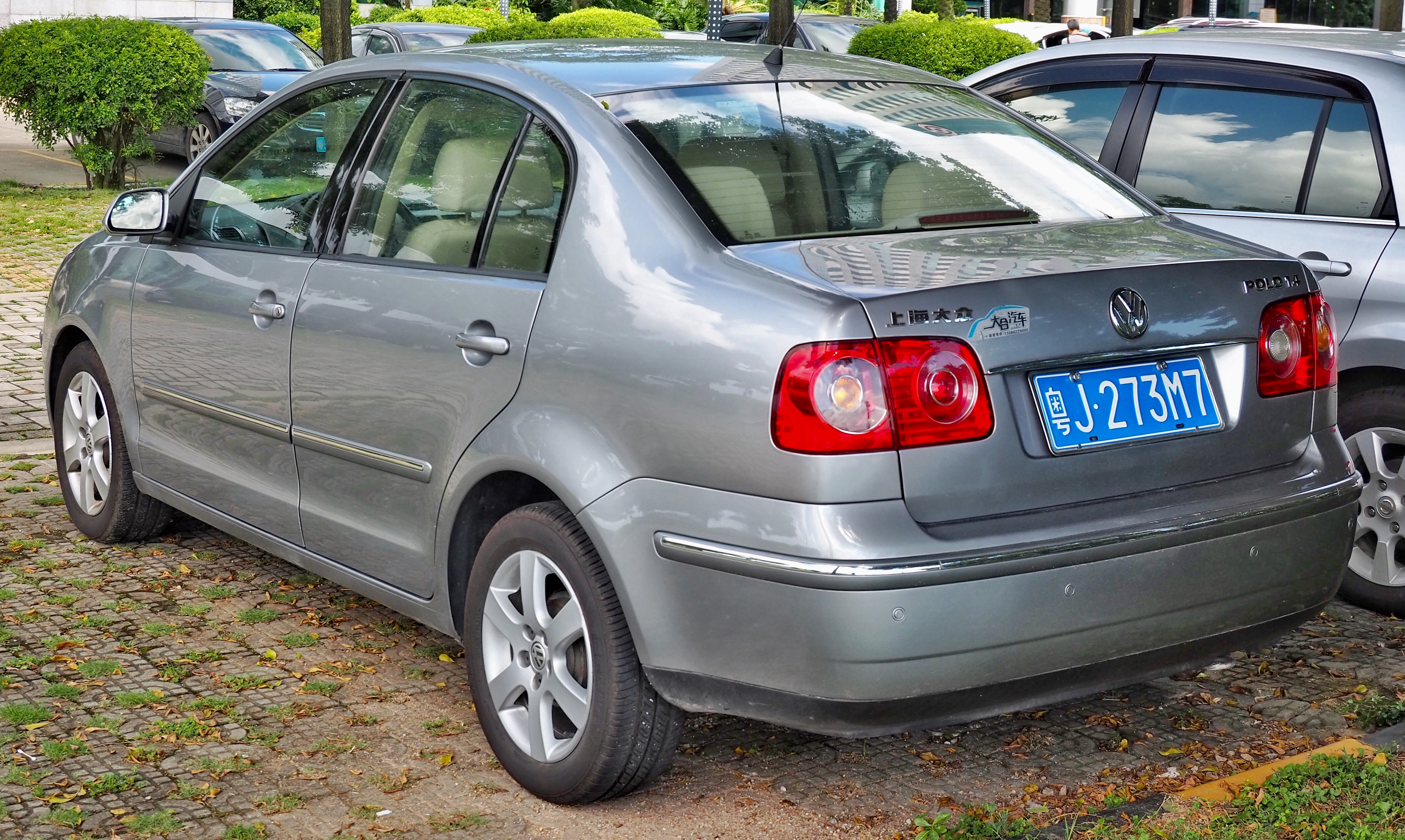
Volkswagen Polo MK4 sedan first facelift (rear)

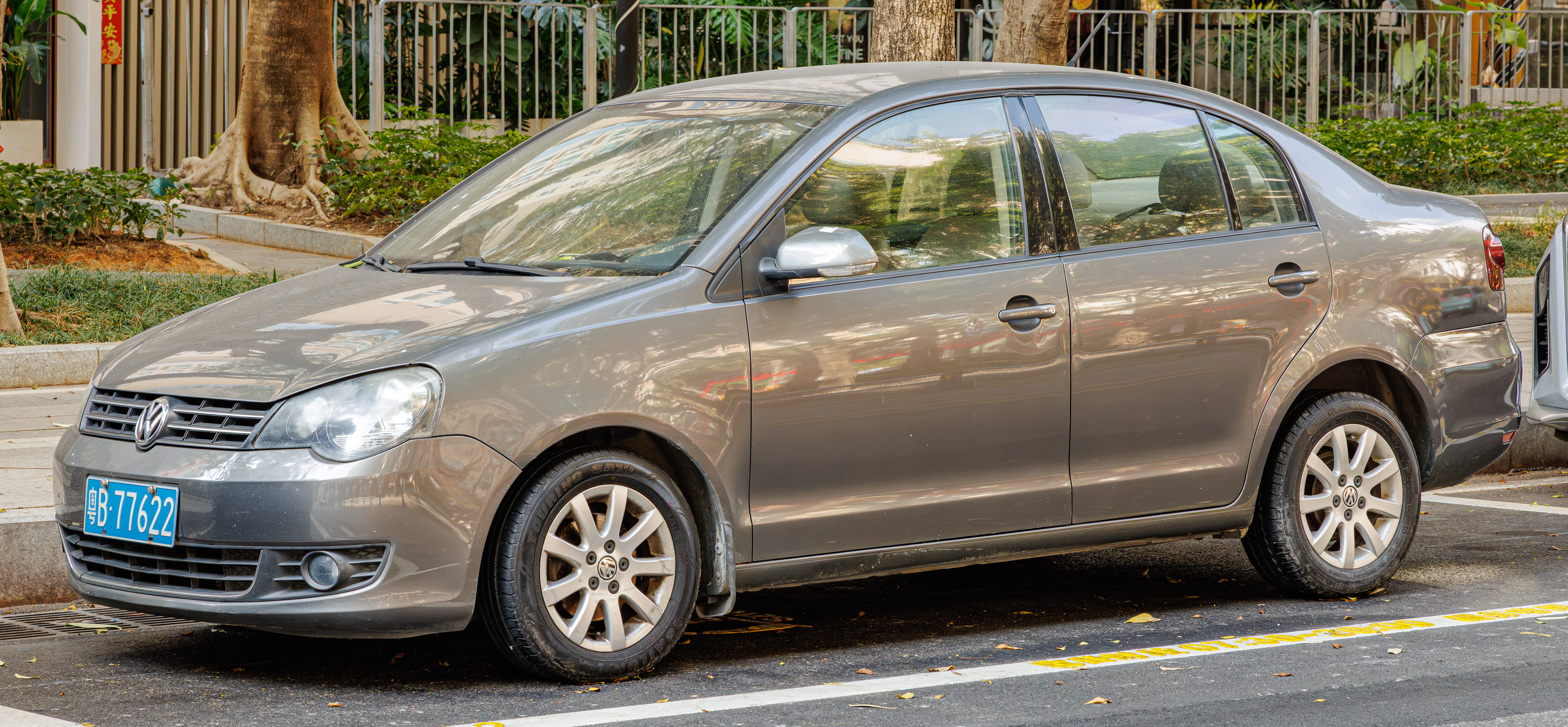
Volkswagen Polo MK4 sedan second facelift

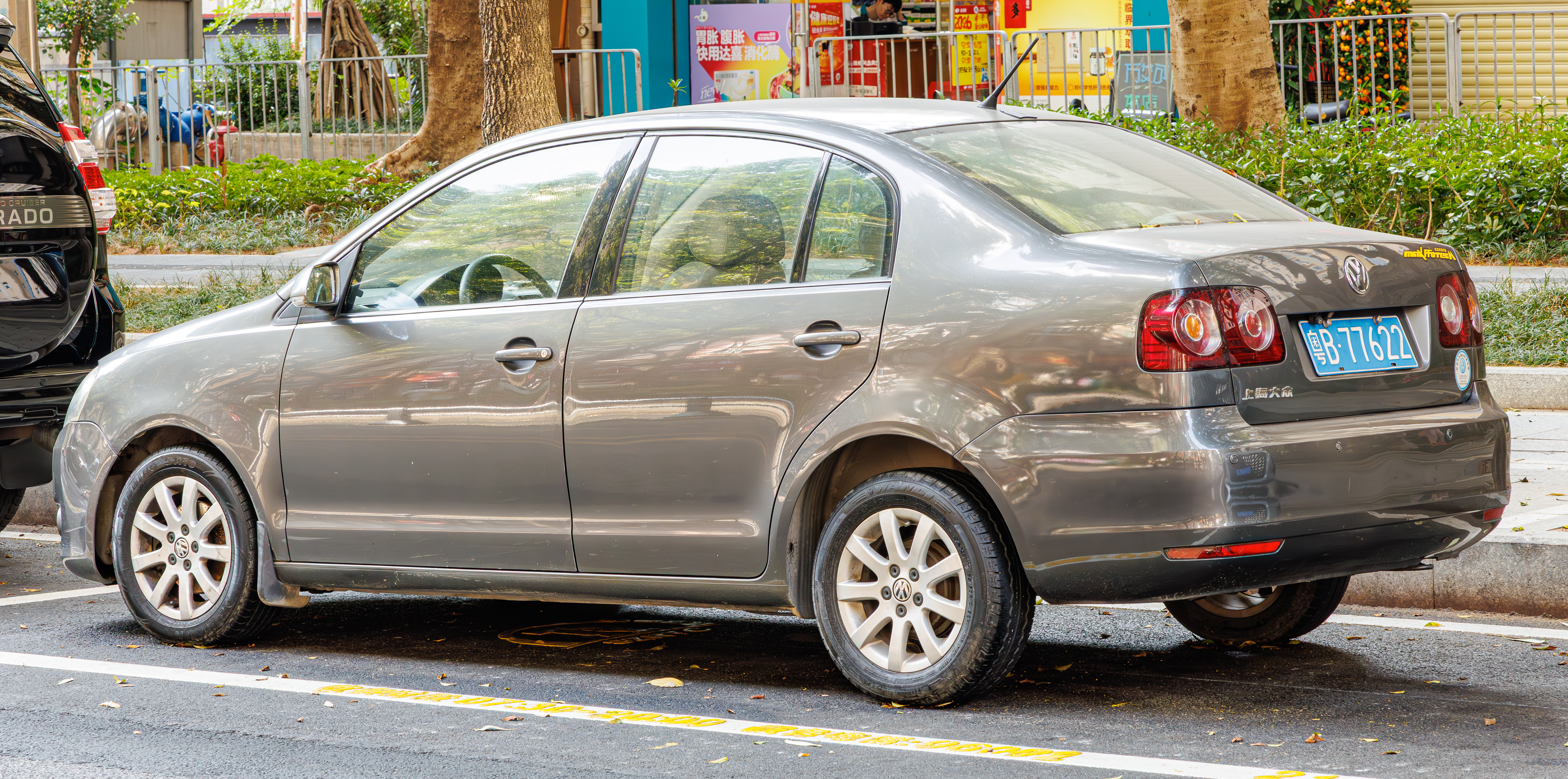
Volkswagen Polo MK4 sedan second facelift (rear)

=== Facelift ===
In May 2005, the Polo Mk4 was facelifted, creating the Mk4F (internal designation Typ 9N3) moniker, with new headlights, door mirrors, taillights and a different hatch, which resembled other recently launched models in the Volkswagen line-up of the time. The Typ 9N3 came in six different trims, ranging from the basic E model to the GTI. Like its predecessor, the standard models use the same engine range from the 1.2 L 55 PS (40 kW) 3-cylinder engine to the 1.9 L 100 PS (74 kW; 99 hp) TDI engine. A 9N3 model Polo with a 2.0L 8v petrol engine shared with the Mk4 Golf 2.0, was also available specific to the South African market from 2005–2007, badged under the 'Highline' trim.

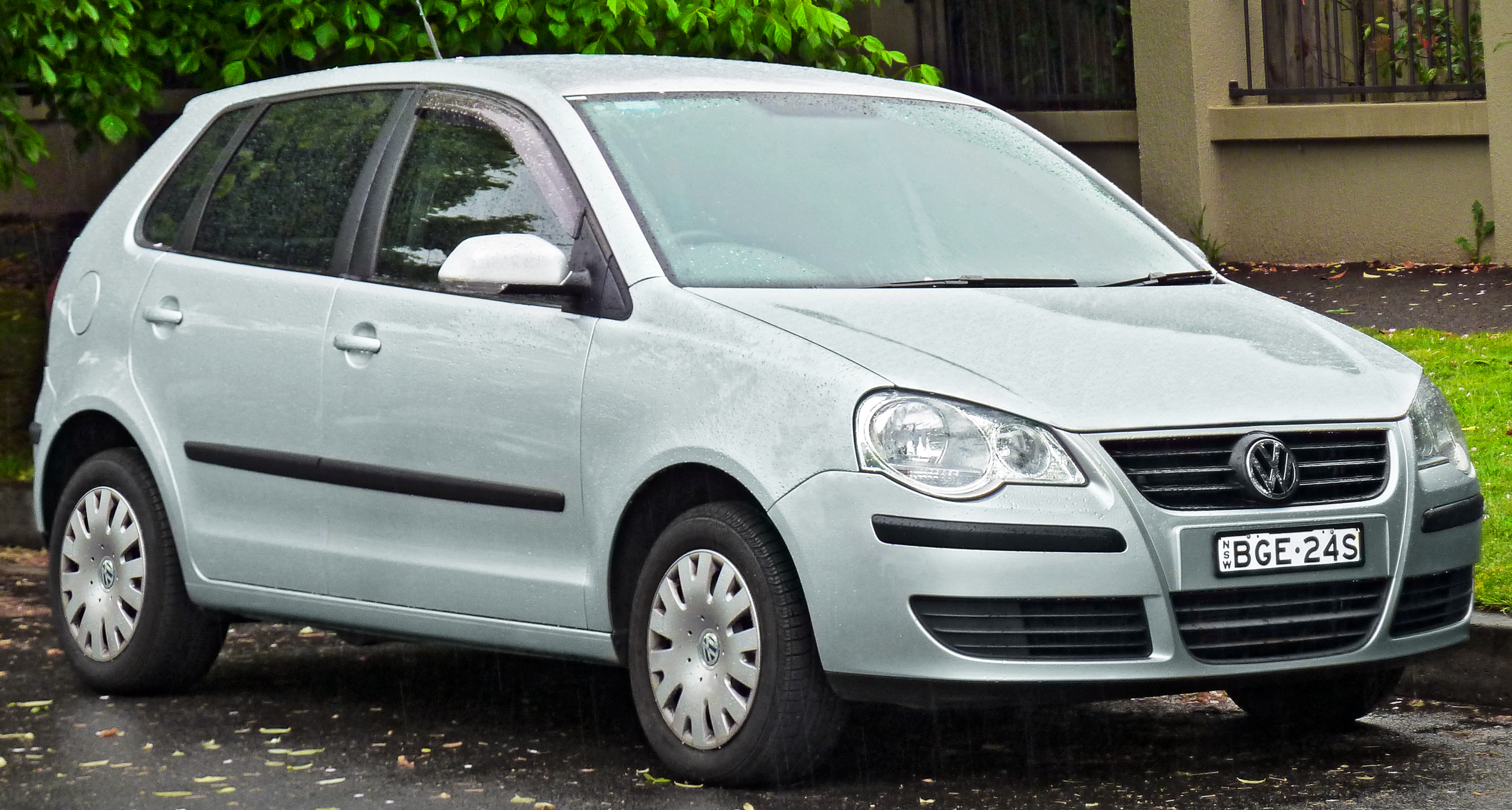
Volkswagen Polo Mk4 5-door (facelift)

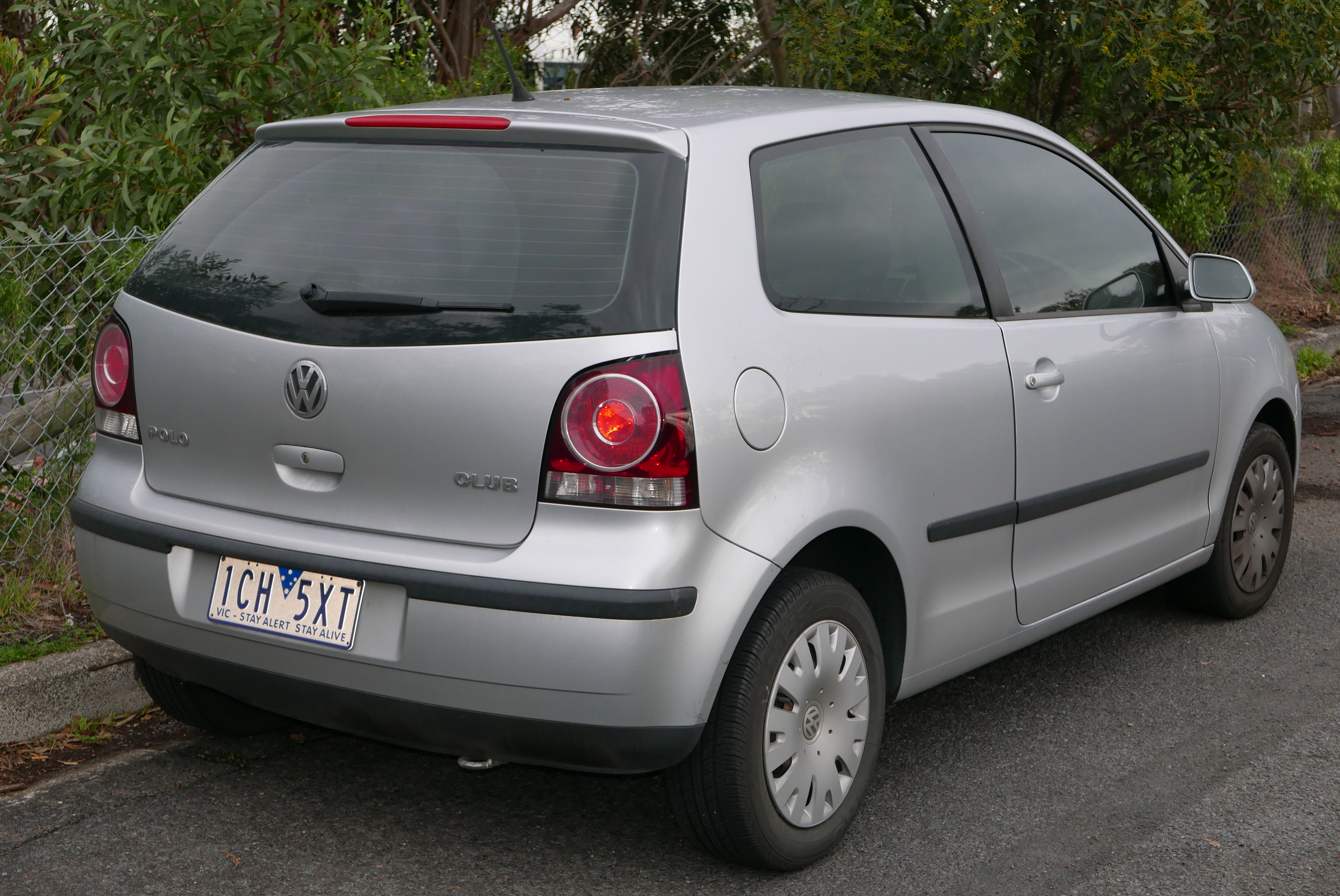
Volkswagen Polo Mk4 3-door (facelift)

=== Polo GTI ===
With the introduction of the Polo Mk4, the Polo GTI Mk3 was discontinued and was given no direct replacement. It was not until late 2005 that the Polo GTI was reintroduced. It was unveiled on 21 October 2005 at the Australian International Motor Show. It featured a 20-valve turbocharged 1.8-litre 150 PS (110 kW; 148 hp) petrol engine which had been used in models such as the Golf GTI Mk4 and the Passat Mk5.

Its styling bears some resemblance to the Mk5 Golf GTI, with a blacked out central "scoop" in the bumper surrounding the honeycomb grille. In this new model the fully digital climate control is optional and xenon lights are not available, unlike the Polo GTI Mk3 which featured them as standard. Although faster than the previous model, the Polo GTI Mk4 is less powerful than the top versions of the Opel/Vauxhall Corsa, BMW MINI and its stablemate SEAT Ibiza, most of which come with engines with a maximum output above 180 PS (132 kW; 178 hp). This led Volkswagen to quickly beef up the Polo further to create the Polo GTI Cup Edition, which was tuned to around 180 PS (132 kW; 178 hp) and featured more aggressive styling.

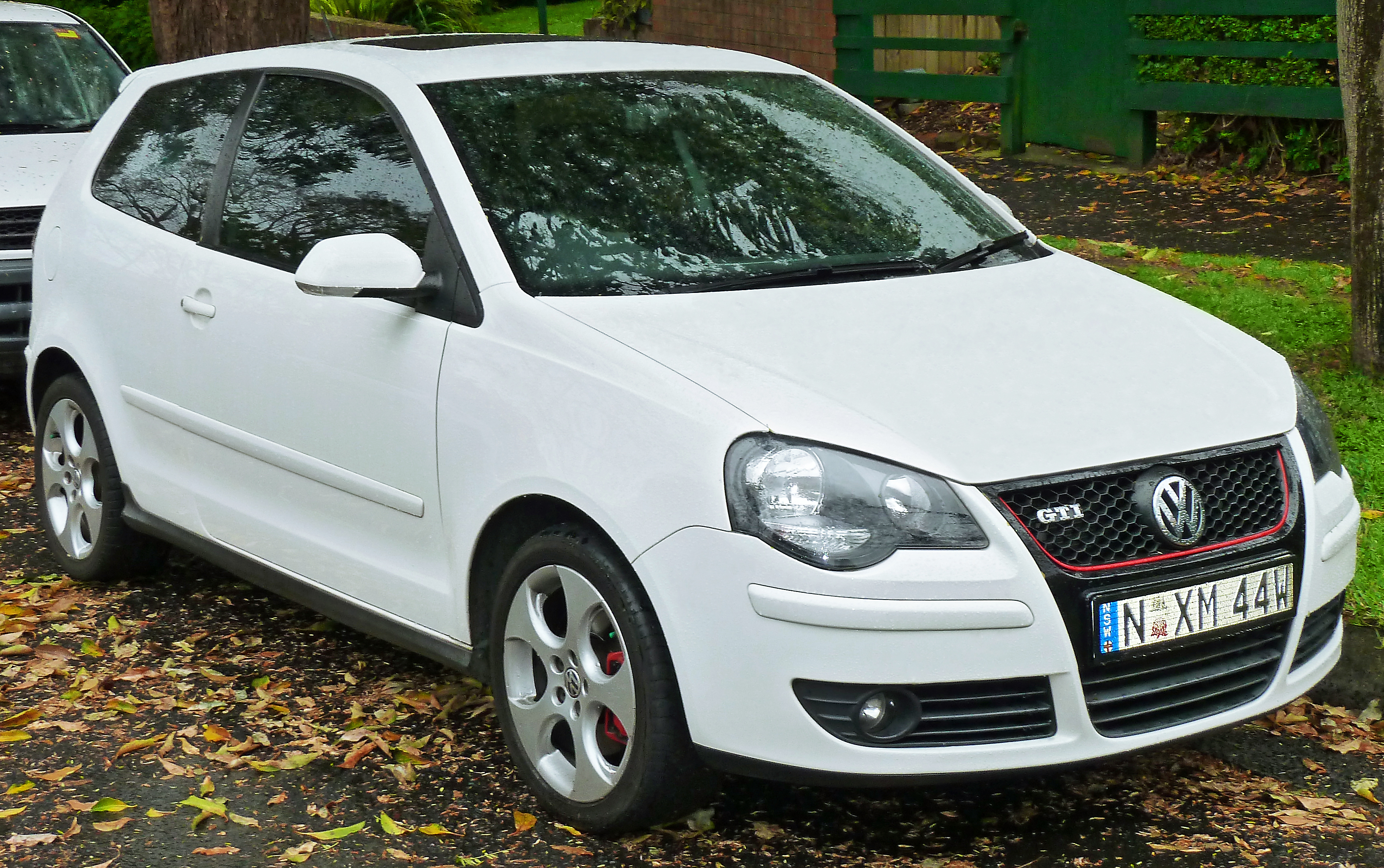
Volkswagen Polo GTI

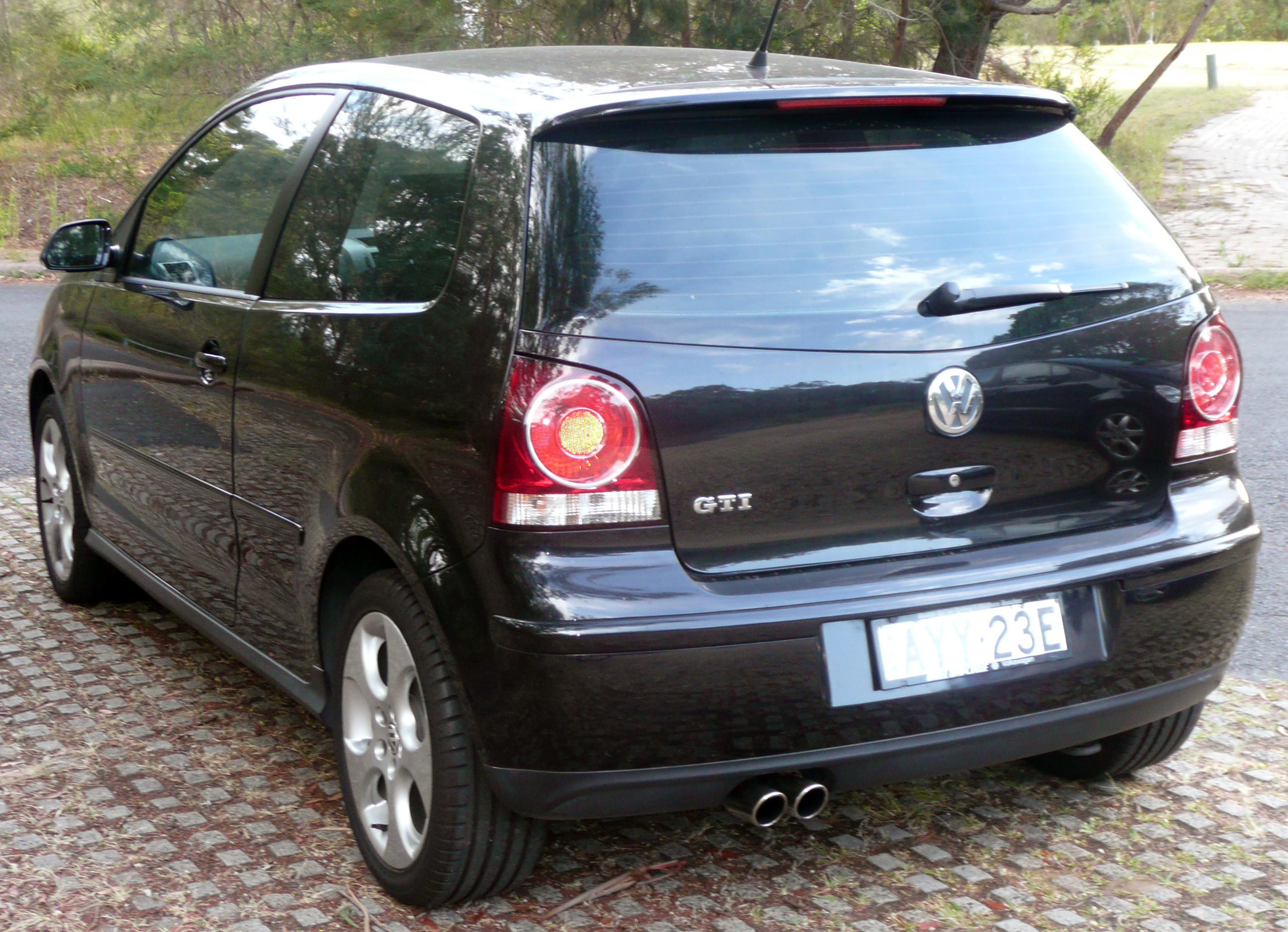
Volkswagen Polo GTI (rear)

=== Polo Vivo ===
On 11 March 2010, Volkswagen South Africa announced that the Volkswagen Citi Golf is being replaced by a version of the Mk 4 Polo, the Polo Vivo. It is available with a choice of two 1.4-litre engines (55 kW & 63 kW) and a 1.6-litre engine (77 kW). The Polo Vivo is sold in both 3-door and 5-door versions and as a saloon.

In comparison to the Polo Mk4, the Polo Vivo has a restyled front bumper and grille, deleted scuff strips on the bumpers and sides of the car, and side indicators relocated from the wing mirrors back to the front fenders. This restyling gives the Polo Vivo some of the elements of the design language used in other contemporary VW models. It is manufactured at VW's Uitenhage plant in South Africa, which sources 70% of the Vivo parts locally. This model was discontinued in 2018 and this marked the first generation, replaced by a new model based on the Mark 5 Polo.

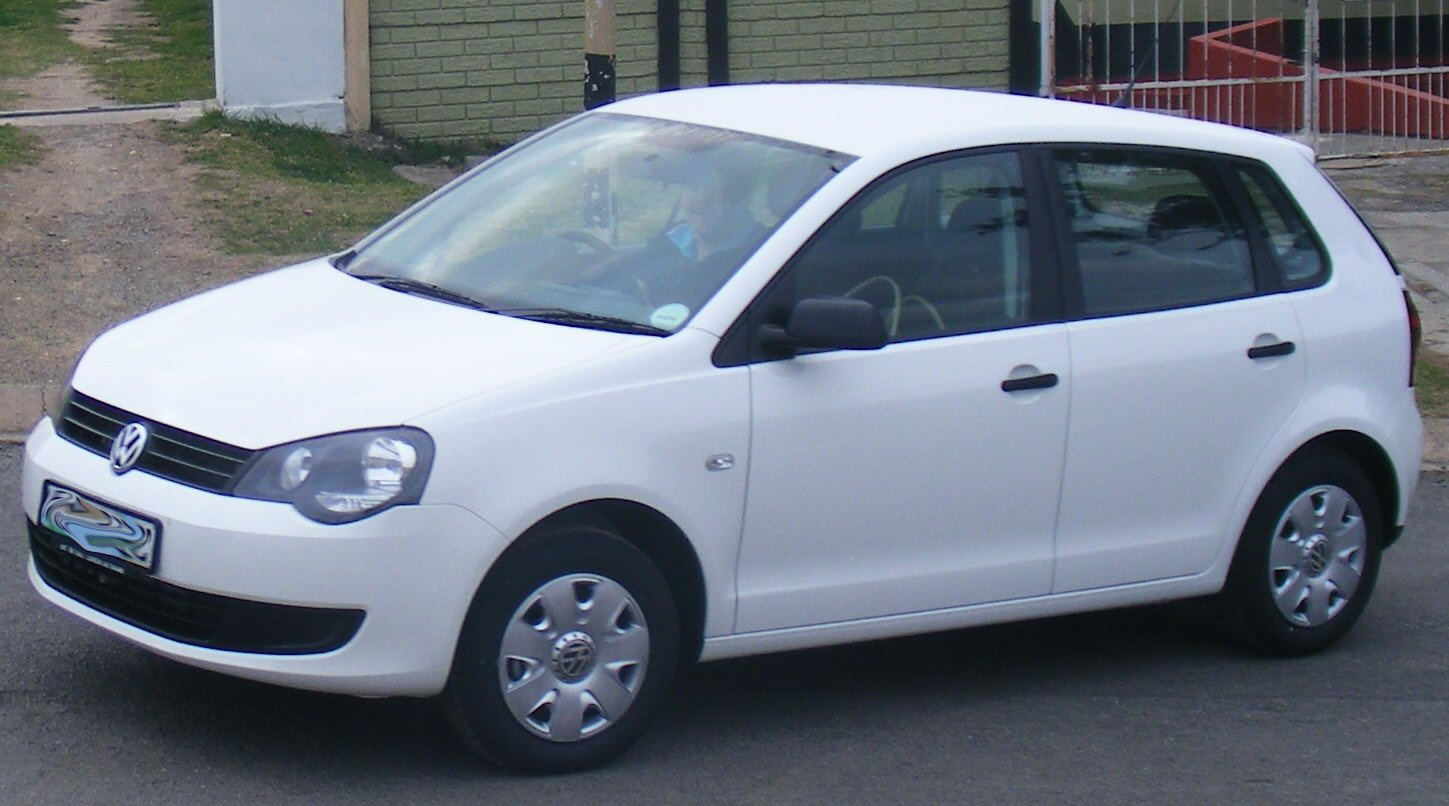
Volkswagen Polo Vivo

=== CrossPolo/ Polo Fun / Polo Dune / Polo Soho ===
There was also a crossover-inspired version of the Polo, similar to the Rover Streetwise, with "off-road" styling, named Polo Fun (Polo Dune in the UK, Polo Soho in Spain, CrossPolo in South Africa), but despite its appearance the car was never available with 4motion four-wheel drive.

A mini SUV-styled (but still two-wheel-drive) CrossPolo version of the Mark IVF was also produced as a successor to the Polo Fun for several markets.

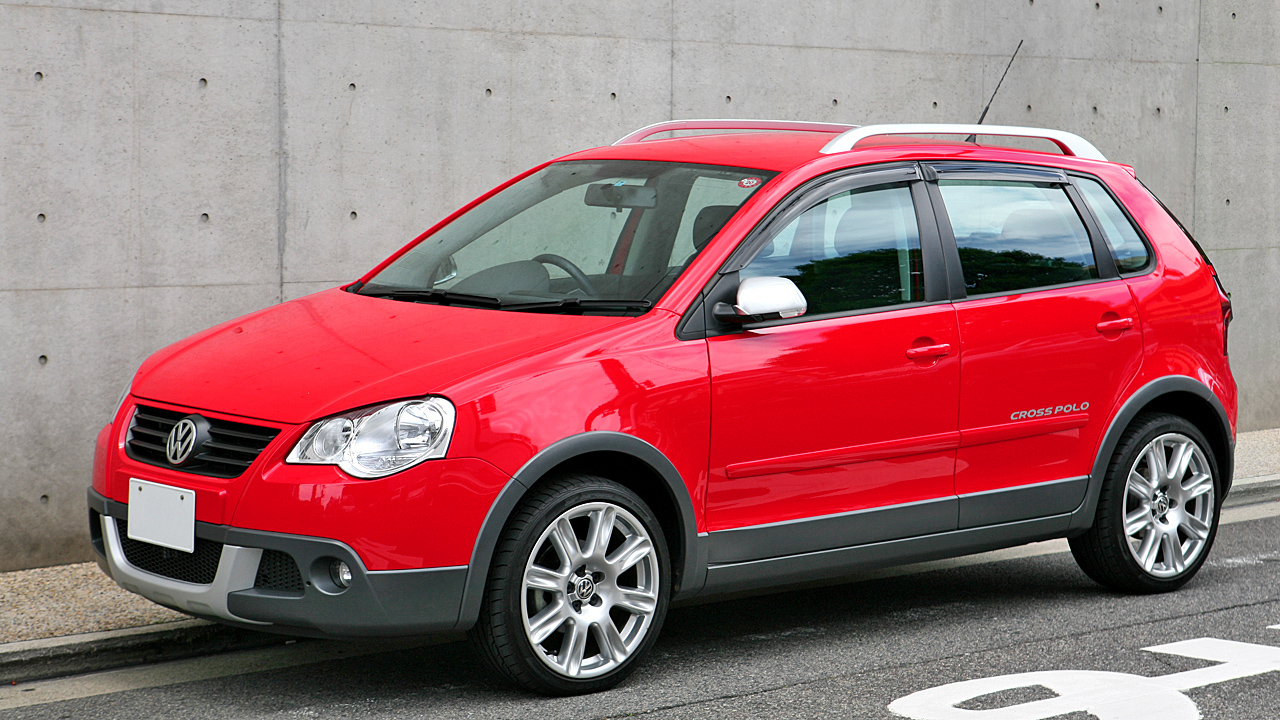
Volkswagen CrossPolo

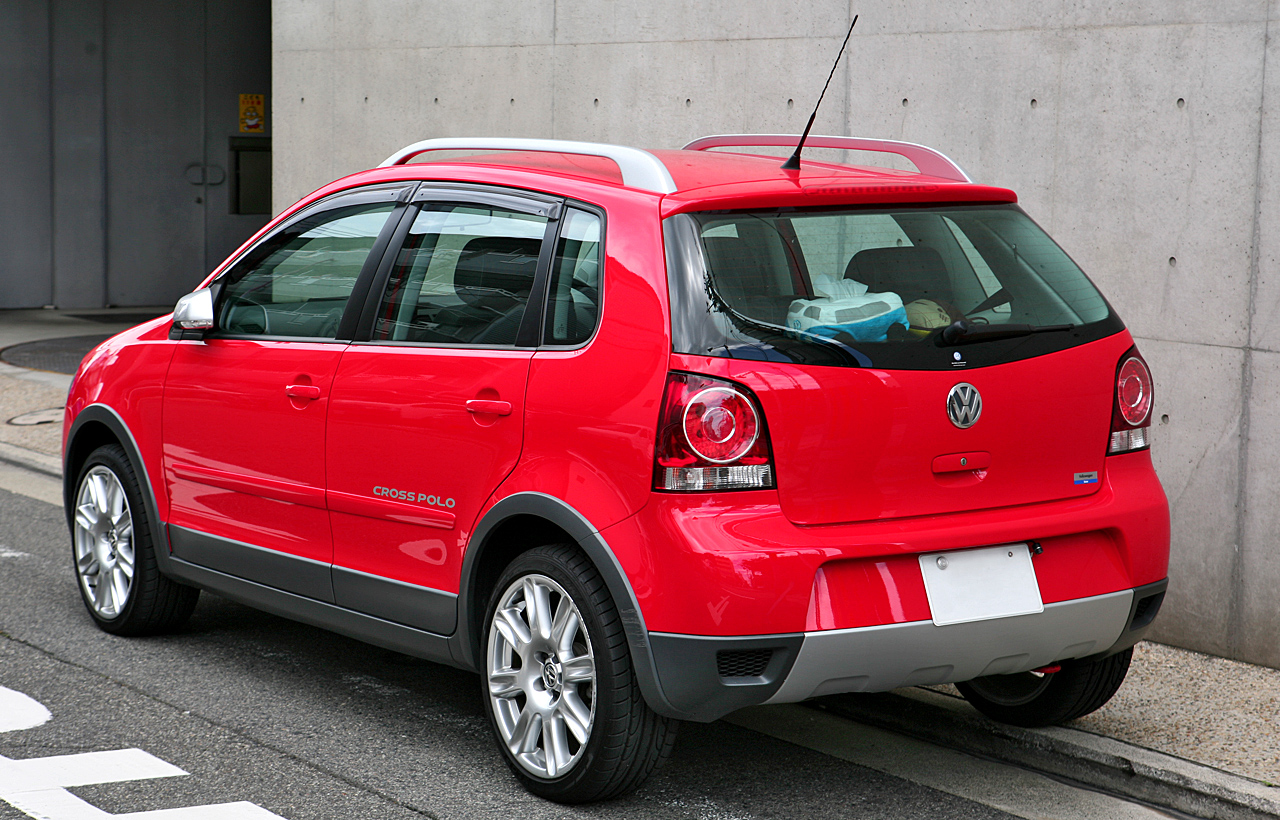
Volkswagen CrossPolo (rear)

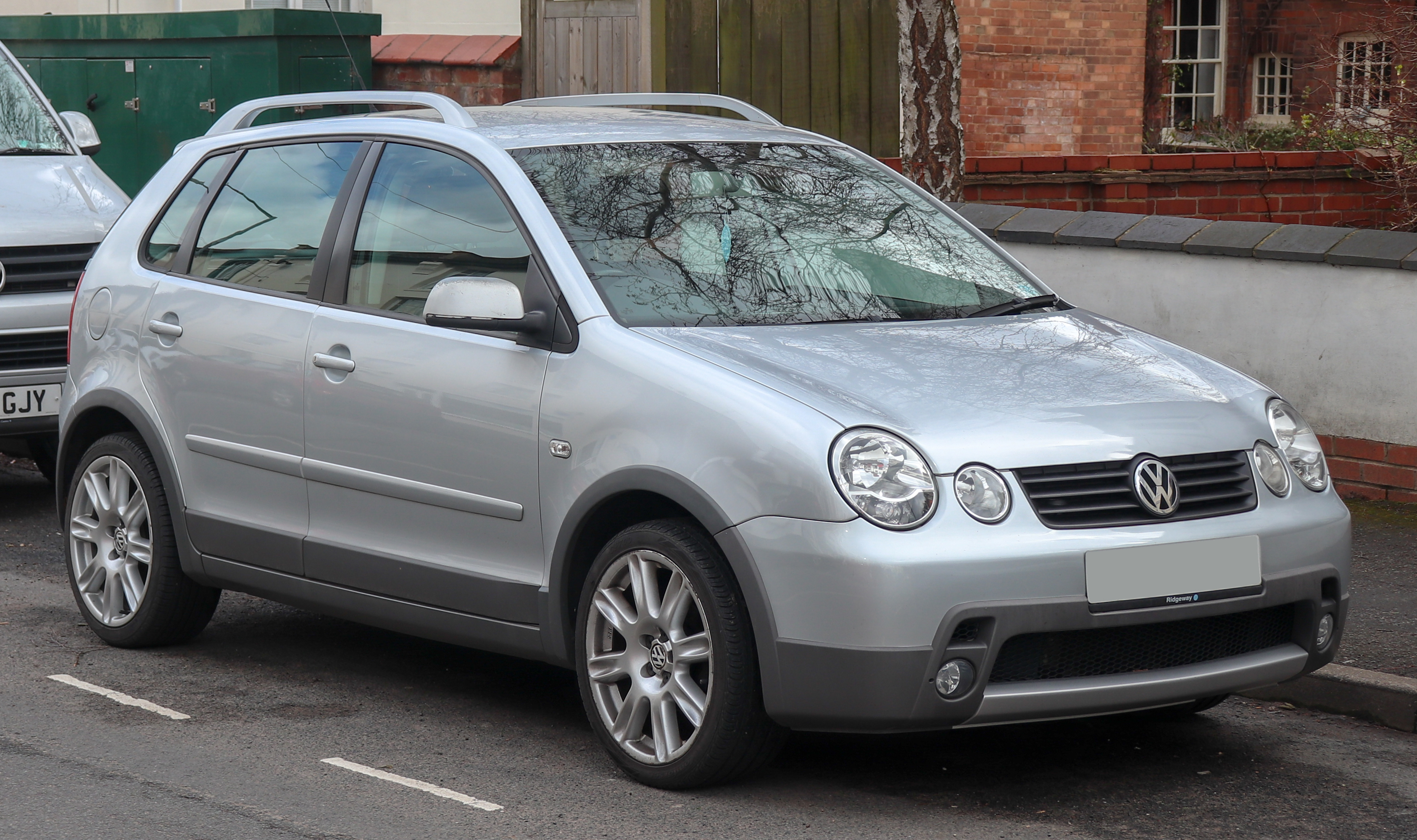
Volkswagen Polo Fun

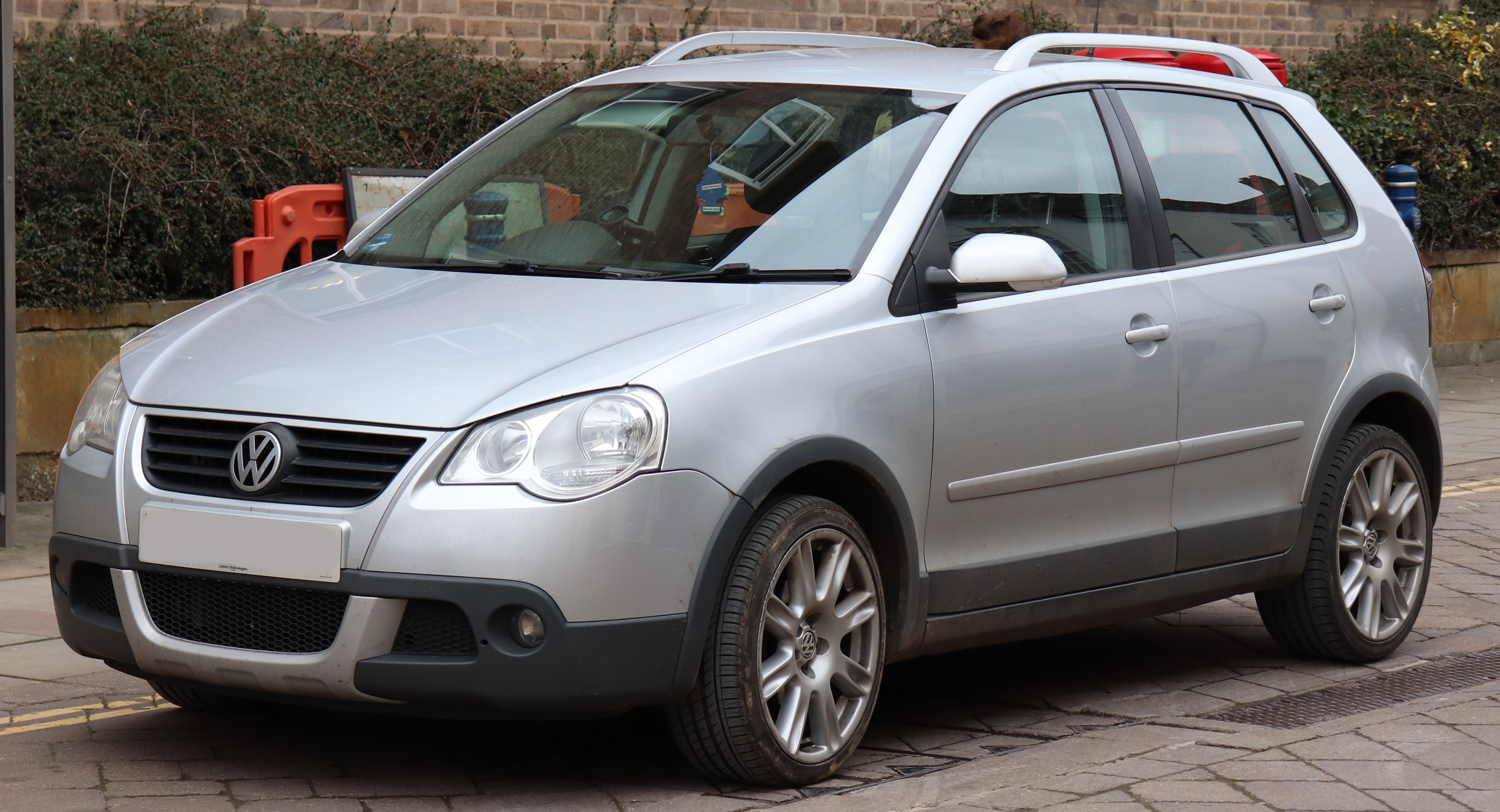
Volkswagen CrossPolo (Sold as the Volkswagen Polo Dune in the UK)

=== Polo BlueMotion ===
In 2006, Volkswagen premiered its BlueMotion range with the emphasis of lower emissions and high fuel economy. Volkswagen's first car under the BlueMotion range is a modified 1.4-litre VW Polo TDI with longer gear ratios, aerodynamic changes and lightweight alloys with low rolling resistant tyres. The end result is a car capable of producing less than 100g/km of CO_{2} with a stated fuel economy of 74.3 mpg (3.8 L/100 km) on a combined cycle. Volkswagen plans to use the platform set by the Polo on expanding their BlueMotion ranges which include the Volkswagen Golf and the Volkswagen Passat.

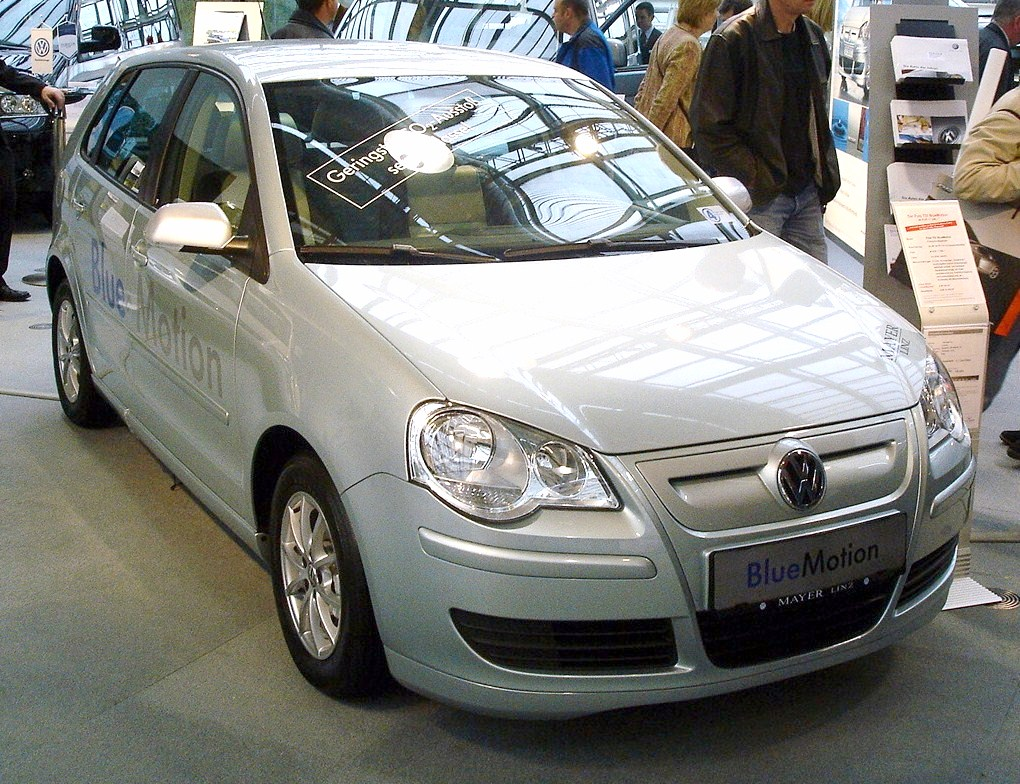
Volkswagen Polo Blue Motion

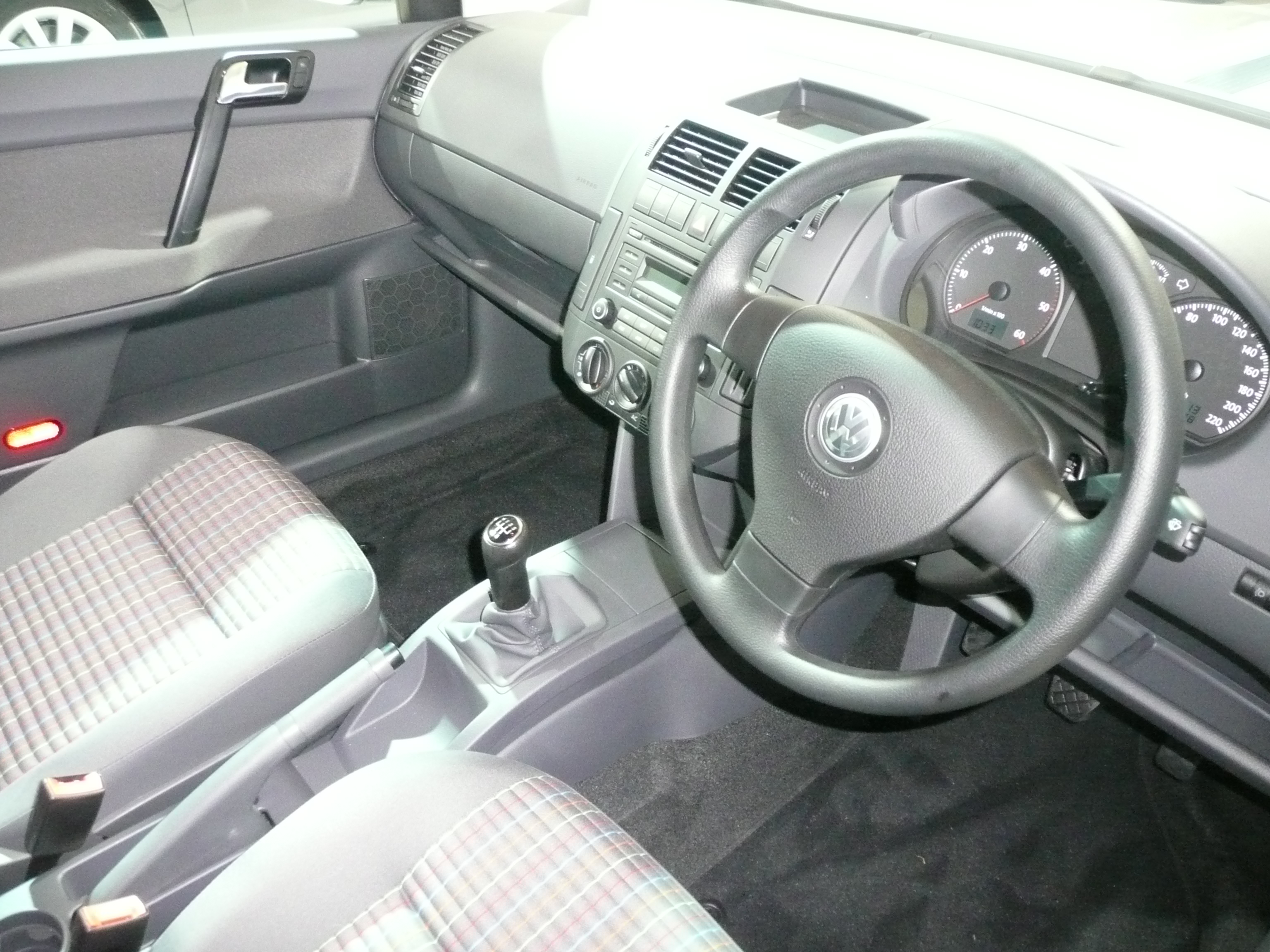
Interior

== Safety ==
The Polo in its most basic version for Latin America received 4 stars for adult occupants and 3 stars for toddlers from Latin NCAP 1.0 in 2012.

Latin NCAP 1.0 test results Volkswagen Polo + 2 Airbags (2012, based on Euro NCAP 1997)
Test	Points	Stars
Adult occupant:	11.34/17.0	4 /5 stars
Child occupant:	36.95/49.00	3 /5 stars

ANCAP test results* Volkswagen Polo variant(s) as tested (2002)
Test	Score
Overall	4 /5 stars
Frontal offset	11.75/16
Side impact	16/16
Pole	Not Assessed
Seat belt reminders	0/3
Whiplash protection	Not Assessed
Pedestrian protection	Poor
Electronic stability control	Not Assessed

== Motorsport ==
Volkswagen Racing rallied a Polo Super 1600 in the 2003 Junior World Rally Championship, winning the Turkish round, with Kosti Katajamäki as the driver. The 1.6-litre engine developed 165 kW (224 PS; 221 hp) to the front wheels.

Volkswagen Racing in South Africa rallied a Super 2000 Polo, that won the South African Rally Driver and Navigator Championship for four consecutive years since 2005. Its 2.0-litre engine delivered a maximum output of 191 kW (260 PS; 256 hp).

== See also ==
- Volkswagen Polo, an overview of all models
- Volkswagen Polo Mk1
- Volkswagen Polo Mk2
- Volkswagen Polo Mk3
- Volkswagen Polo Mk5
- Volkswagen Polo Mk6

Preceded by Volkswagen Polo Mk3	Volkswagen Polo Mk4; 2001–2017	Succeeded by Volkswagen Polo Mk5
