= Nines (notation) =

Logarithmic notation for numbers near 100%

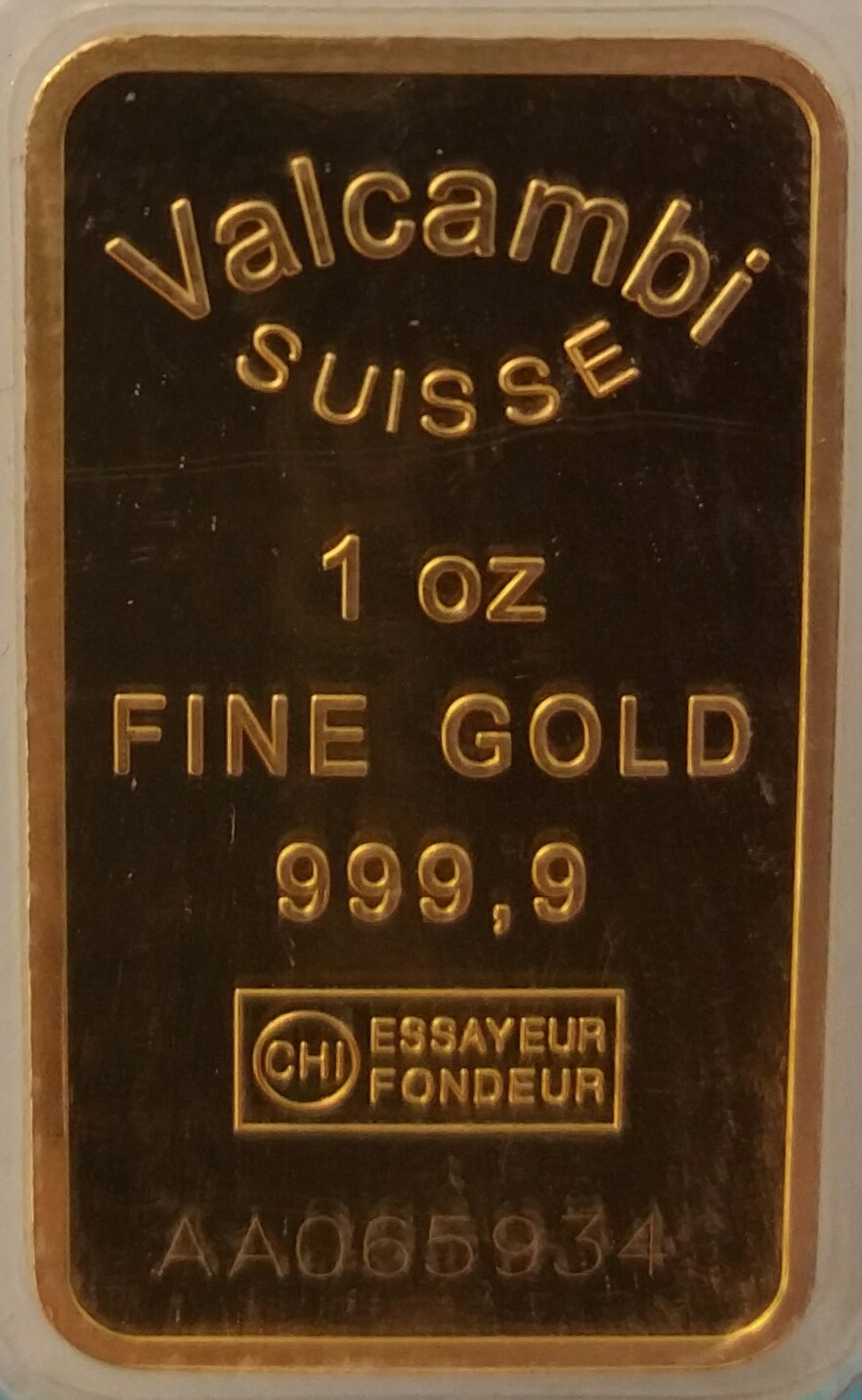
1 troy ounce of four nines fine gold (999.9)

Nines are an informal logarithmic notation for proportions very near to one or, equivalently, percentages very near 100%. Put simply, "nines" are the number of consecutive nines in a percentage such as 99% (two nines) or a decimal fraction such as 0.999 (three nines). Their common uses include grading the purity of materials – especially precious metals and industrial gases – or measuring the availability of a service.

== Nomenclature ==
The nines are a count of the leftmost digits 9 that appear in a proportion. For example, 90% would be described as "one nine"; 99% as "two nines"; 99.9% as "three nines"; and so forth.

However, there are different conventions for representing inexact multiples of 9. For example, a percentage of 99.5% could be expressed as "two nines five" (2N5, or N2.5) or as 2.3 nines, following from the logarithm definition.

A percentage of 100% would, in theory, have an infinite number of nines – though, in the context of purity of materials, 100% is virtually unachievable.

Percent	Permille	Nines		
90%	900	1 nine	1N	N1.0
99%	990	2 nines	2N	N2.0
99.9%	999	3 nines	3N	N3.0
99.95%	999.5	3 nines 5	3N5	N3.5
99.97%	999.7	3.5 nines	?	?
99.99%	999.9	4 nines	4N	N4.0
99.995%	999.95	4 nines 5	4N5	N4.5
99.999%	999.99	5 nines	5N	N5.0
99.9999%	999.999	6 nines	6N	N6.0

The number of nines of a proportion x is:

$\mathrm{nines} = -\log_{10}(1-x)$

== Uses ==
=== Precious metals ===
The exact purity of very fine precious metals such as platinum, gold and silver can be of great interest. Based on the system of millesimal fineness, a metal is said to be one nine or one nine fine if it is 900 fine, or 90% pure. A metal that is 990 fine is then described as two nines fine and one that is 999 fine is described as three nines fine. Thus, nines are a logarithmic scale of purity for very fine precious metals. Similarly, percentages ending in a 5 have conventional names, traditionally the number of nines, then "five", so 999.5 fine (99.95% pure) is "three nines five", abbreviated 3N5.

Canada's Big Maple Leaf, a coin made of gold at 5N (99.999%) purity, stands as the purest gold coin ever minted, anywhere. The purest gold ever achieved was reportedly produced at the Perth Mint in 1957, at "almost six nines" (99.9999%) purity, as measured by the Worshipful Company of Goldsmiths of London.

=== Gases ===
The nines scale is also used in other contexts, such as describing the purity of gases. The purity of a gas is an indication of the ratio of it to other gases in its mixture, as measured by volume. Thus, a high purity refers to a low amount of other gases, or impurities. Gases of higher purity are in many contexts considered to be of better quality and are usually more expensive.

The purity of a gas is generally expressed as a grade prefixed with the letter N (rather than postfixed), indicating the "number of nines" in the percentage or decimal fraction. For example, a N2.0 gas is 99% (two nines) pure and 1% impurities by volume; a N6.0 gas is 99.9999% (six nines) pure, with 1 part per million (1 ppm or 1 vpm, volume per million) impurities.

Intermediate values indicate the digit following the last nine. For example, N4.6 estimates a purity level of 99.996% (four nines followed by a six). An alternative representation uses the common logarithm: for example, a gas which is 99.97% pure would be described as N3.5, since log_{10}(0.03%) = −3.523.

=== System availability ===
Nines are used in a similar manner to describe computer system availability. In this context, a "one nine" (90%) uptime indicates a system that is available 90% of the time or, as is more commonly described, unavailable 10% of the time – about 72 hours per month. A "five nines" (99.999%) uptime describes a system that is unavailable for at most 26 seconds per month.

== See also ==
- List of unusual units of measurement
- Parts-per notation
- 0.999...
