= Campbell baronets of St Cross Mede (1815) =

The Campbell baronetcy, of St Cross Mede, Winchester, Hampshire, was created in the Baronetage of the United Kingdom on 22 May 1815 for the soldier Guy Campbell. The title was granted in honour of his father, Colin Campbell, wartime Governor of Gibraltar, and was created with remainder to the heirs male of his father.

== Campbell baronets, of St Cross Mede (1815) ==
- Sir Guy Campbell, 1st Baronet (died 1849)
- Sir Edward Fitzgerald Campbell, 2nd Baronet (1822–1882)
- Sir Guy Theophilus Campbell, 3rd Baronet (1854–1931)
- Sir Guy Colin Campbell, 4th Baronet (1885–1960)
- Sir Guy Theophilus Halswell Campbell, 5th Baronet (1910–1993)
- Sir Lachlan Philip Kemeys Campbell, 6th Baronet (born 1958)

The heir apparent is Archibald Edward Fitzgerald Campbell (born 1990).

== Extended family ==
Sir Ronald Campbell, second son of the third Baronet, was a diplomat.

== Coat of arms ==
Coat of arms of Campbell baronets of St Cross Mede
Crest A boar's head erased or langued gules. Escutcheon Quarterly 1st and 4th, Gyronny of eight or and sable 2nd, argent a lymphad sails furled and oars in action sable 3rd, Or a fess chequy azure and argent all within a bordure embattled ermine. Motto Over the crest

== Notes ==
Baronetage of the United Kingdom
Preceded by Antrobus baronets	Campbell baronets of St Cross Mede; 22 May 1815	Succeeded by Clifford-Constable baronets
