= Sir Edward Campbell, 2nd Baronet =

Sir Edward FitzGerald Campbell, 2nd Baronet (25 October 1822 – 23 November 1882) was a British baronet and soldier.

== Early life ==
Campbell was born on 25 October 1822. He was the eldest son of Sir Guy Campbell, 1st Baronet and the former Pamela FitzGerald.

His paternal grandparents were Lieutenant-General Colin Campbell and his wife Mary Johnson. His mother was daughter of Lord Edward FitzGerald (fifth son of the Duke of Leinster) and Pamela Syms.

== Career ==
He fought in the Punjab Expedition in 1849, the Afridis Expedition in 1850, and the Siege of Delhi in 1858. He was aide-de-camp to the commander-in-chief, India. He was promoted to major in 1858; and ended his military career as lieutenant-colonel of the 60th Foot.

== Personal life ==
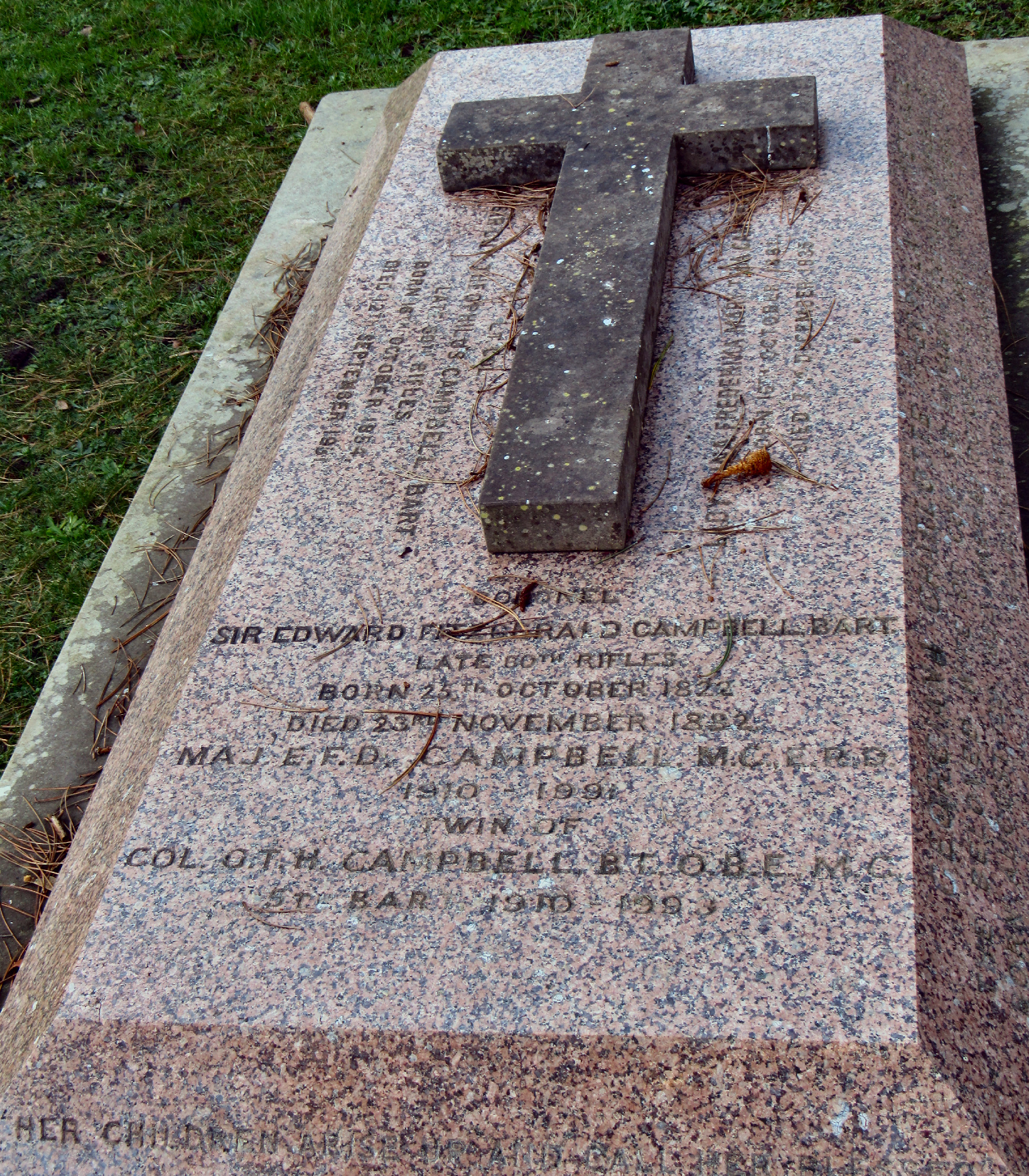
St Nicholas' Church, Thames Ditton

On 24 October 1853 he married Georgiana Charlotte Theophilia Metcalfe in Simla, India. She was a daughter of Sir Thomas Theophilus Metcalfe, 4th Baronet and Felicite Anne Browne. Her first cousin was Gen. Sir Sam Browne, VC, inventor of the Sam Browne belt. Sir Thomas was an East India Company civil servant and agent of the Governor General of India at the imperial court of the Mughal Emperor Bahadur Shah Zafar. Before her death during childbirth, they were the parents of thirteen children, of which there were two sets of twins, including:

- Sir Guy Theophilus Campbell, 3rd Baronet (1854–1931)
- Pamela Georgina Campbell (1855–1857)
- Charles James Napier Campbell (1856–1924)
- Edward FitzGerald Frederick Campbell (1856–1902)
- Annie Charlotte Campbell (1859–1947)
- Gerald FitzGerald Campbell (1862–1933)
- Ven. Colin Arthur FitzGerald Campbell (1863–1916)
- Rev. Francis Bunbury Campbell (1863–1905)
- Percy FitzGerald Campbell (1865–1907)
- Finetta Madelina Julia Campbell (1866–1932)
- Ion Douglas FitzGerald Campbell (1868–1915), father-in-law of Evelyn, Lady Southesk
- Griselda Mary Campbell (1869–1929)
- George Theophilus Campbell (1872–1924)

Sir Edward died on 23 November 1882.

Baronetage of the United Kingdom
Preceded by Guy Campbell	Baronet (of St Cross Mede); 1849–1882	Succeeded by Guy Campbell
