= Ma Belle =

Ma Belle may refer to:

- "Ma-Ma-Ma Belle", song by the Electric Light Orchestra
- "Ma Belle Amie", 1970 single by Tee Set
- "Ma Belle Marguerite", song from the musical Bless the Bride
- "Ma belle", a 2019 song by Moha La Squale

== See also ==
- Ma Bell, nickname for the Bell System telephone companies
