= Vivian Ellis =

English musical comedy composer (1903–1996)

- Born: Vivian John Herman Ellis; 29 October 1903; Hampstead, London, England, United Kingdom
- Died: 19 June 1996 (aged 92)
- Genres: Musical comedy; Light music; Classical
- Occupations: Musician, composer, lyricist
- Instrument: Piano

Vivian John Herman Ellis, CBE (29 October 1903 – 19 June 1996) was an English musical comedy composer best known for the song "Spread a Little Happiness" and the Paul Temple theme "Coronation Scot".

== Life and work ==
Ellis was born in Hampstead, London in 1903 and educated at Cheltenham College. He began a musical career as a concert pianist, but became a composer and lyricist. His grandmother, Julia Woolf, had also been a concert pianist as well as composing an opera, Carina.

He had great success with the foxtrot song "Over My Shoulder" in the early 20s. This led to further contributions of pieces for several revues in the 1920s. Another hit song was his "Yale Blues" which had a dance step called the "Yale" and became a craze in 1927 both in the UK, Europe and the US.

He became well known in the London West End theatre community for providing the music and collaborating in the production of a large number of musical shows, spanning from 1925 to 1958. Ellis dominated the musical theatre of the 1930s with up to three shows running most years of the decade. In spite of his music being both pleasant and catchy, few of his compositions were recorded (with the exception of "I'm on a See-Saw" by Fats Waller and "This is My Lovely Day" by Lizbeth Webb and Georges Guetary), the latter from Bless the Bride (1947, to lyrics by A. P. Herbert), so his name gradually faded from the public eye after his last London production. He also wrote many songs found in British films of the 1930s.

His last full-length musical, Half in Earnest, appeared in 1958. He contributed to revues for a few more years and then turned his hand to writing a series of amusing books such as How To Enjoy Your Operation.

Ellis became the President of the Performing Right Society and in 1984 the society instituted an annual event – the Vivian Ellis Prize – to encourage young composers and lyricists to write for the musical stage. Ellis gave all the writers the same advice: "Try and put at least one hit song in every musical you write." Several of the promising writers featured in the competition went on to success, including Charles Hart who wrote lyrics for The Phantom of the Opera, and Philip Glassborow whose comedy musical The Great Big Radio Show! was a personal favourite.

Ellis as a composer was "rediscovered" in the 1980s when his 1929 musical Mr. Cinders (featuring the hit song, "Spread a Little Happiness") was revived at the King's Head Theatre in London and then transferred to the West End for a very successful run of over 500 performances . The song also charted in a version by Sting, following its ironic use in the film Brimstone and Treacle. His song "This is My Lovely Day" also appeared in the John Cleese comedy Clockwise in 1987.

Ellis's composition "Alpine Pastures" was used as the theme song for the long-running BBC radio series My Word. His autobiography, published in 1953, is entitled I'm on a See-Saw, named after the hit song from his musical Jill Darling.

In 2008, the King's Head Theatre in London announced they would present the world premiere of Godiva, a previously unproduced musical (book by Guy Bolton) written in the 1950s, but the production never materialised.

=== Coronation Scot ===
Another light music composition, Coronation Scot, was the signature tune for the series Paul Temple. The rhythm of the train in this piece was inspired by his commute to and from his home in Selworthy, near Minehead, Somerset to London Paddington. The original recording of "Coronation Scot", for the Chappell Recorded Music Library, was arranged by Cecil Milner. and played by the Queen's Hall Light Orchestra, conducted by Charles Williams.

== Productions ==
=== Pre-World War II ===
- By-the-Way (1925)
- Mercenary Mary (1925) – interpolations only into UK production
- Still Dancing (1925)
- Kid Boots (1926) – interpolations only into UK production
- Blue Skies (1927)
- Clowns in Clover revue (1927) – interpolations only
- The Girl Friend (1927) – interpolations only into UK production
- Will o' the Whisper (1928)
- I've Fallen in Love (1929) — performed by Cicely Courtneidge in the 1929 revue "The House that Jack Built" and the 1930 British International Pictures revue "Elstree Calling"
- Mr. Cinders (1929)
- The House That Jack Built (1929)
- Follow a Star (1930)
- Little Tommy Tucker (1930)
- Blue Roses (1931)
- Stand Up & Sing (1931)
- Song of the Drum (1931) – with Herman Finck
- Out of the Bottle (1932)
- Please (1933)
- Jill Darling (1933)
- Streamline (1934)
- The Town Talks revue (1936)
- Going Places revue (1936)
- Floodlight revue (1937)
- Hide & Seek (1937)
- The Fleets Lit Up (1938)
- Running Riot (1938)

=== Post World War II ===
- Big Ben (1946)
- Bless the Bride (1947)
- Tough at the Top (1949)
- And So To Bed (1951)
- Over the Moon (1953)
- Listen to the Wind (1954)
- The Water Gipsies (novel) (1955)
- Half in Earnest (1958)

=== Songs (some that have recordings) ===
- "Over My Shoulder"
- "The Yale Blues" (1927)
- "I'm on a See Saw"
- "Piccadilly" (1944)
- "She's My Lovely"
- "Spread a Little Happiness"
- "This is My Lovely Day"
- "Ma Belle Marguerite"
