= Joseph Pitcairn =

American diplomat (1764–1844)

Joseph Pitcairn (1764–1844) was an American diplomat, landowner and the American consul to the free Hansa city of Hamburg. The town of Pitcairn in New York State is named in his honour.

He married Lady Edward Fitzgerald, widow of the Irish Republican Lord Edward Fitzgerald in 1800.

They had a daughter Helen (Born Hamburg 27 April 1803 - Died London 17 April 1896)
