= Jill Fraser =

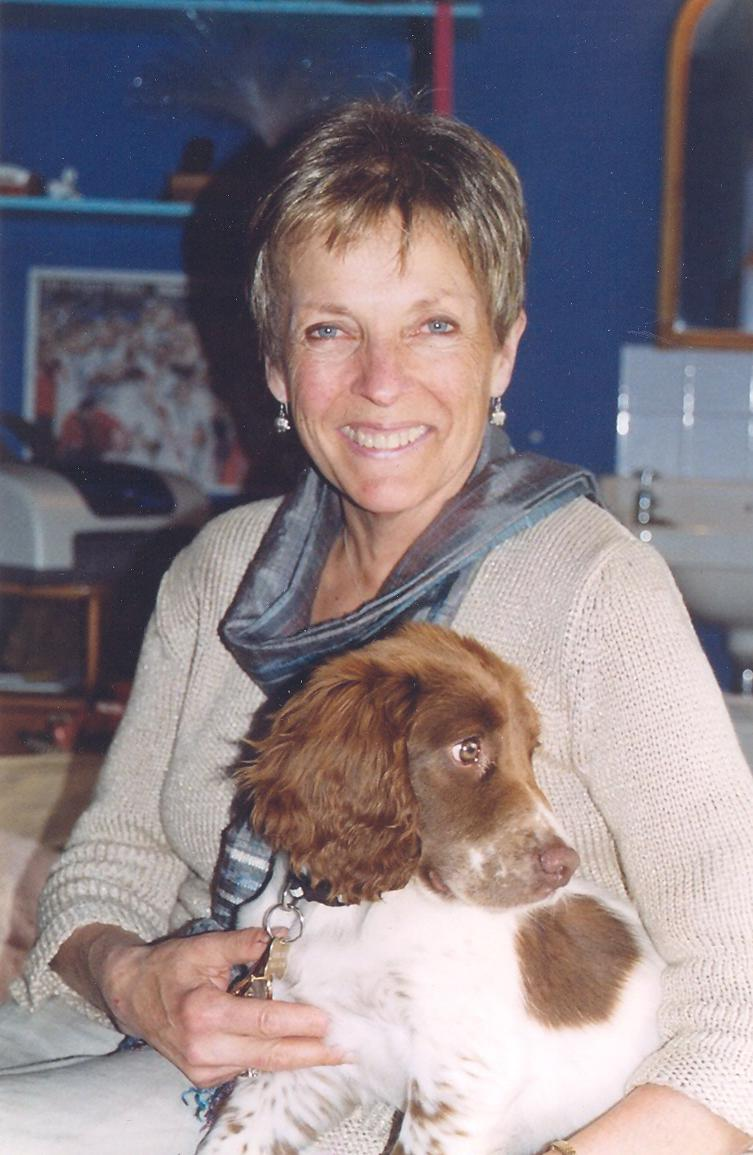
Jill Fraser and her dog Oscar

Jill Fraser, MBE (15 April 1946 – 10 February 2006) was a British theatre owner and director.

The daughter of the actor Alec Fraser, who played the Vagabond King in New York, and the West End actress Guinevere Fraser, she co-owned (with her husband James Sargant), and was artistic director of, the Watermill Theatre from 1981 until her death.

The Watermill Theatre is located in the hamlet of Bagnor near Newbury in Berkshire. Under her direction it became a major regional theatre, attracted Michael Hordern to be its president (until his death in 1995), furthered the careers of new acting talents (including Sean Bean and David Suchet), and provided an outreach programme to take drama to communities without theatres.

"The Watermill, steered by its director Jill Fraser, is one of the few theatres in the country that seems to make a conscious effort to promote new musicals, as opposed to revivals, transfers from Broadway and compilation shows. Celebrations for the theatre's 30th birthday included excerpts from its world premiere productions of The Ugly Duckling, Warts And All, and The Great Big Radio Show!"

Although she and her husband had put the theatre up for sale with the intention of securing its longer term future (the preferred option being the Watermill Theatre Trust, set up to continue Fraser's vision), she died from cancer, aged 59, before this was due to be completed in summer 2006. However, the security of its long-term future is in no doubt.
