= Portaferry Lake =

Lake in St. Lawrence County, New York, United States

- Location within New York Location within the United States
- Location: St. Lawrence County, New York, United States
- Coordinates: 44°13′39″N 75°11′49″W
- Basin countries: United States
- Surface area: 79 acres (0.32 km^{2})
- Max. depth: 93 feet (28 m)
- Shore length^{1}: 2 miles (3.2 km)
- Surface elevation: 860 feet (260 m)
- Settlements: East Pitcairn, New York
- ^{1} Shore length is not a well-defined measure.

Portaferry Lake is located by East Pitcairn, New York. Fish species present in the lake are atlantic salmon, smallmouth bass, yellow perch, rainbow trout, white sucker, and black bullhead. There was a State-owned carry down launch on Route 3, 9 miles northeast of Harrisville, which still shows on the DEC map of the lake, but the waterbody is now privately owned since the retirement of the Boy Scout Camp in 2007. The lake is found at an elevation of 860 feet (260 m).
