= Julia Woolf =

English composer (1831–1893)

Sophia Julia Woolf (1831–20 November 1893) was an English composer known for songs and opera.

Woolf's father was John Woolf, a furrier. She had two sisters and was married to John Isaacson. Woolf's daughter, Maud, was the mother of the musician Vivian Ellis

== Life and works ==
Woolf composed piano pieces and songs for theatrical productions. A review of her opera Carina in the New York Times described it as:

"Carina," the new comic opera produced at the Opera Comique to-night, gives every indication of achieving a pronounced success: The story is light and good, the comedy opportunities are numerous, and the music is artistically firm and popularly pleasing.

== Works ==
- Carina — Comic opera, music by Julia Woolf, words by EL Blanchard and Cunningham Bridgman, first produced at the Opera Comique, London, Sept. 27, 1888.
