= Lizbeth Webb =

British singer and actor (1926–2013)

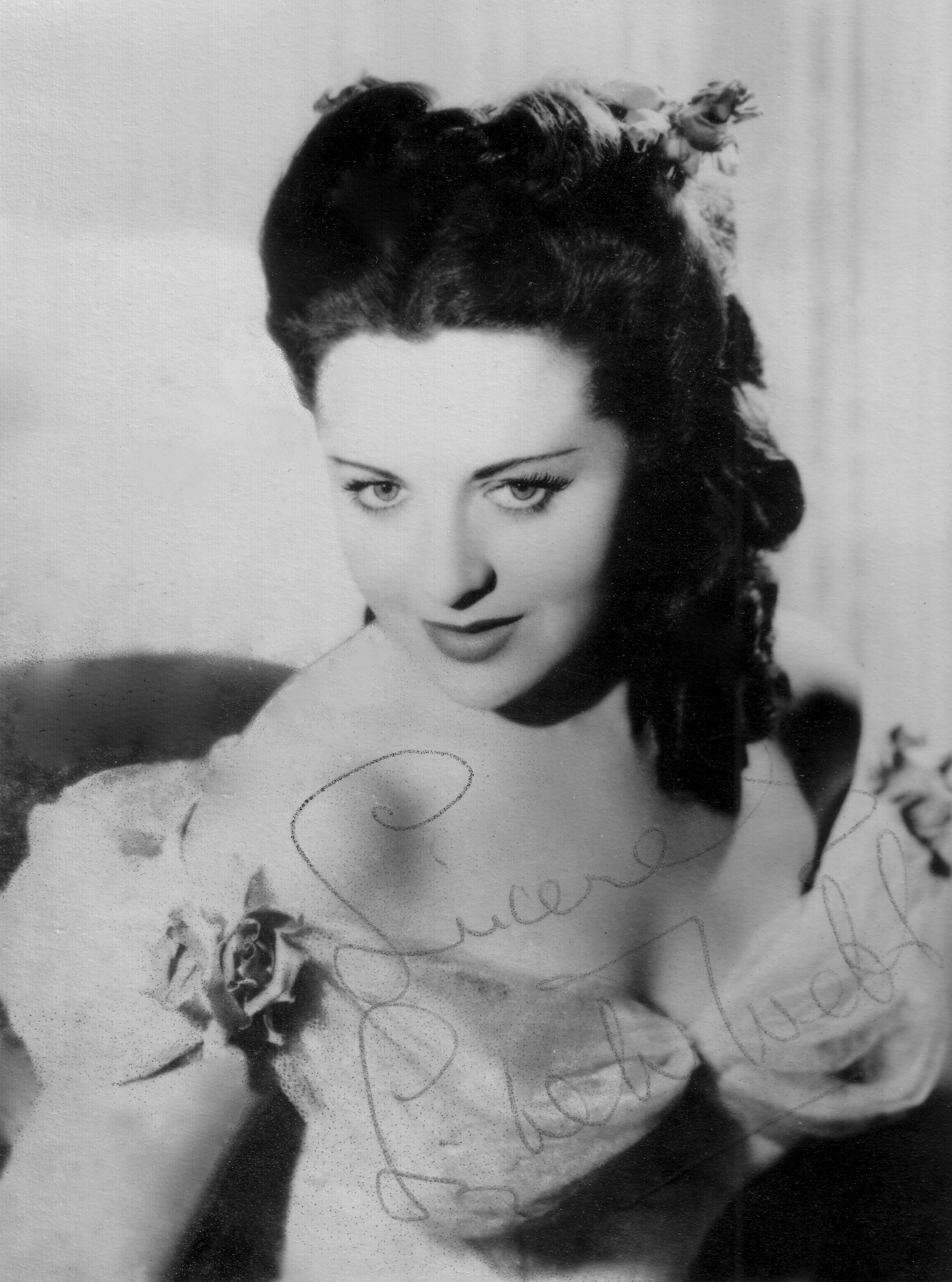
- Webb in Bless the Bride (1947)
- Born: Betty Ethel Holton; 30 January 1926; Reading, Berkshire, England
- Died: 17 January 2013 (aged 86); London, England
- Occupations: Soprano, actress
- Years active: 1943–1969
- Spouse(s): Donald H. Parker; Col. Sir Guy Campbell, Bt. (deceased 19 July 1993)

Betty Ethel Holton (30 January 1926 – 17 January 2013), better known by her stage name, Lizbeth Webb, was an English soprano and stage actress. Known as "the champagne soprano", she is remembered partly for originating the song "This Is My Lovely Day".

After performing as a dance band vocalist and entertaining British troops during World War II, Webb pursued a career in West End musicals, becoming known for her vivaciousness in playing such roles as Lucy Willow in Bless the Bride, Linda in Ivor Novello's Gay's the Word and Sarah Brown in Guys and Dolls. She married Colonel Guy Campbell, the heir to a baronetcy, and left the stage in the late 1950s, bringing up two sons but returning for a last engagement in the title role of The Merry Widow in 1969.

== Early life and career ==
Webb was born in Reading, Berkshire, the last of three children of Frederick Holton, a locomotive engine driver, and his wife Ethel, née Strutt (1895–1926). Webb's mother died in childbirth, and she was adopted by her aunt and uncle, Ethel and Alfred Wills Webber. Her sister and brother were adopted by other aunts. She attended E. P. Collier Primary School, where she was known as Betty Webber. She later went on to Hemdean House School and Queen Anne's School, both in Caversham, Reading. As a child, she excelled at rowing, swimming and running. From an early age, she took singing lessons.

She began her career as a teenage band vocalist and on BBC Radio under the name Betty Webb, singing to the troops during World War II and freelancing with British bands, often for Jack Payne, who discovered her, and also for Albert Sandler, Henry Hall, Louis Levy and Geraldo. She generally performed two or three live broadcasts daily during the height of the German air-raids. She was also a regular on programmes such as Happidrome, Workers Playtime, Kaleidoscope, "Music Hall", Variety Bandbox, Four and Twenty, The Forces Show with Diana Dors, Jack Buchanan and Bob Monkhouse, Follies of the Air with Sonnie Hale, Home at Eight with Hermione Gingold and Richard Attenborough, and Friday Night Is Music Night. Among the conductors she sang with were George Melachrino, Mantovani, Richard Tauber, Harry Rabinowitz, Stanley Black, Max Jaffa, Charles Mackerras, both Eric and Stanford Robinson and Vilém Tauský.

In addition to entertaining the Allied troops, she took part in propaganda broadcasts of German light music, often in German, working with Mischa Spoliansky, and sketches with upbeat tales of life in Britain. This placed her on potential Nazi death lists.

== West End success ==
Webb in Guys and Dolls, London 1953

After an introduction from Geraldo, in 1946, the impresario Charles B. Cochran engaged her to work for him and changed her name to Lizbeth Webb. She first understudied and then took over the lead, Grace Green, in Vivian Ellis and A. P. Herbert's parliamentary satire Big Ben at the Adelphi Theatre in London and on tour (1946). Ellis and Herbert wrote a leading role for her the next year, Lucy Willow, in the hit musical Bless the Bride, in which her character leaves a stuffy English fiancé, who she does not love, to elope with a brave and dashing Frenchman, played by Georges Guétary. One of her songs with Guétary, "This Is My Lovely Day", became one of the BBC's most requested songs of all time, and the song's popularity, and that of the show, were increased by their association with the wedding in 1947 of Princess Elizabeth and Lt. Philip Mountbatten (later Queen Elizabeth and Prince Philip). The show's sweeping score also included another popular song for Webb and Guétary, "I Was Never Kissed Before". Oklahoma! opened in the West End the same year as Bless the Bride, but the British musical was not overshadowed by the American hit, enjoying a good reception from the critics and audiences and running for more than two years and 886 performances. Webb became known as "The Champagne Soprano", and she was admired on stage for her "vibrancy and vivacity".

Webb played in pantomime, including the role of Dick Whittington in 1950, and starred as Cinderella opposite the stars of The Goon Show in 1951 on The Light Programme. Ivor Novello wrote the role of Linda especially for Webb in his last musical, Gay's the Word. The show began with performances in Manchester in 1949 and came to the West End in 1951, where it was another hit. Webb was praised for her singing of the ballads in the show. She also played Sarah Brown in the first London production of Guys and Dolls at the London Coliseum in 1953, which was broadcast as a Royal Variety Performance. The same year, she was also featured in the Royal Command Performance given in the presence of the newly crowned Queen Elizabeth. Webb continued to entertain the troops between West End engagements, in Austria after the war, in Korea in 1953 (while under enemy attack) and in Cyprus and Libya in 1956, where she met her second husband, who was head of the British military force in Tripoli.

Webb toured the British provinces in Jubilee Girl (1956), a troubled production that she, the director, the choreographer and others abandoned before it arrived in London. She next appeared as Giulietta in a 1959 television production of the musical Carissima, by Eric Maschwitz with music by Hans May, starring Ginger Rogers.

== Family and later years ==
Webb was engaged briefly to Peter Sellers in 1951 after appearing with him on The Light Programme. Her first husband was Donald H. Parker, an RAF pilot, from whom she was divorced after several years. On 17 August 1956, Webb married Colonel Guy Campbell, OBE, MC, the heir to a baronetcy. Campbell earned the Military Cross and, upon his father's death in 1960, inherited his family title. Webb and Campbell had two sons, Sir Lachlan Philip Kemeys Campbell, Bt., an artist and illustrator (Eton Colours, When It Happened in Scotland, and When It Happened in Britain), born in 1958, who has three children, Archie, Georgia and Ivo; and Rory Charles Fitzgerald Campbell, a classical singer and musical theatre actor who owns the entertainment company Encore Entertainment Ltd., born in 1961, who has a daughter, Olivia.

Webb effectively retired from the stage by the late 1950s to bring up her children, although she continued to make guest appearances on radio and on television comedy shows of Charlie Drake and Dickie Henderson. She also did casting work. In 1969, she starred in the title role of The Merry Widow on tour and then at the Cambridge Theatre in London. She and her husband moved to Marbella, Spain, where they lived for a few years in the 1970s before returning to England and living in Cheltenham. Her husband died there in 1993, and Webb moved to London to spend her last two decades.

In 2004, a CD of her songs, entitled My Lovely Day With Lizbeth Webb – The Champagne Soprano, was issued. The following year, another CD was released called Lizbeth Webb: With a Song in My Heart.

Webb died in 2013 at age 86.
