= Pamela, Lady Campbell =

Irish writer and noblewoman

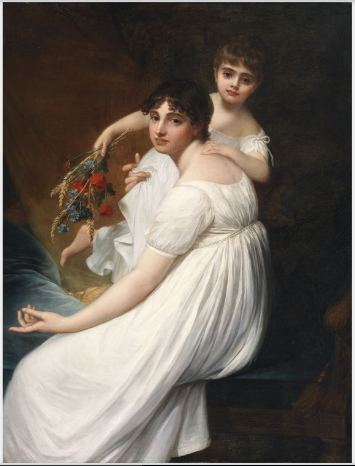
Pamela, Lady Campbell as a child with her mother, Lady Edward Fitzgerald

Pamela, Lady Campbell was an Irish writer who published four books between 1853 and 1866. She was also the daughter of Irish revolutionary Lord Edward Fitzgerald.

== Early life ==
Campbell was born in Dublin in 1795. She was the eldest daughter of Lord Edward Fitzgerald, a leader of the Irish Rebellion of 1798, and his wife Pamela Syms of France. Her mother is believed to have been the illegitimate daughter of Louis Philippe II, Duke of Orléans and Stéphanie Félicité, comtesse de Genlis.

== Private life ==
Pamela Fitzgerald married Major-General Sir Guy Campbell, whom she had met in Scotland, in either 1818 or 1820. Sir Guy had been made a Baronet for his military service, having been wounded in combat and having served at the Battle of Waterloo. The couple had seven daughters and three sons before Sir Guy died unexpectedly in 1849.

Campbell was a friend of fellow Irish novelist Sydney, Lady Morgan and a correspondent of George Howard, 7th Earl of Carlisle.

== Writing ==
Campbell wrote four books following her husband's death in 1849. In the 1850s, she wrote two stories for children: The Story of an Apple and The Cabin by the Wayside. In the 1860s, she wrote two novels for adults: Martin Tobin and A Woman's Confession.

== Selected works ==
- The Story of an Apple (1853)
- The Cabin by the Wayside: A Tale for the Young (1854)
- Martin Tobin (1864)
- A Woman's Confession (1866)
