= Hemdean House School =

Location
- Hemdean Road; Caversham, Berkshire, RG4 8LR; England; 51.47134°N 0.975134°W

Information
- Type: Private day school
- Motto: Laborate et Gaudete ("Work and Rejoice")
- Religious affiliation: Church of England
- Established: 1859
- Founder: Francis Knighton
- Closed: 2024
- Head teacher: Helen Chalmers
- Gender: Mixed
- Age: 3 to 11
- Houses: Knighton; Henderson; Kennet
- Colours: Light blue and Dark blue
- Alumni: Lizbeth Webb
- Website: http://www.hemdeanhouse.co.uk/

Hemdean House School was a mixed, independent, primary and nursery school for children aged 3–11. It was situated in the centre of Caversham in Reading, Berkshire, England. The school operated as a non-profit registered charity.

Hemdean House School was founded in 1859 by Francis Knighton. In 1862 land was bought for £320. The new building was named Hemdean House. The school formerly had a girls' senior school, which was closed in 2016. In 2018, Hemdean House was listed 29th in the Sunday Times list of 100 best performing independent schools in the UK.

On 12 July 2024 the school permanently closed. This was mainly due to dwindling numbers of students, which led to fees totalling up to around £3,990 per term.

== Notable alumni ==
- Elsie Smith – nurse and missionary
- Lizbeth Webb – soprano and actress
