= Pitcairn, New York =

- Town
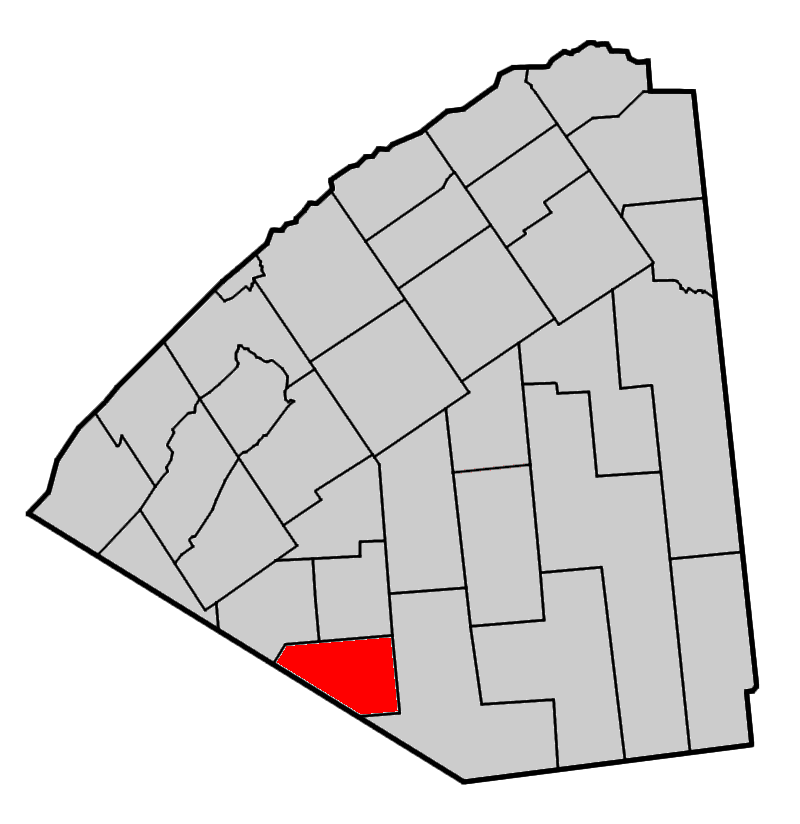
- Map highlighting Pitcairn's location within St. Lawrence County.

- Location within the state of New York
- Coordinates: 44°12′23″N 75°17′14″W
- Country: United States
- State: New York
- County: St. Lawrence

Area
  - Total: 59.46 sq mi (153.99 km^{2})
  - Land: 58.52 sq mi (151.56 km^{2})
  - Water: 0.94 sq mi (2.43 km^{2})
- Elevation: 980 ft (300 m)

Population (2020)
  - Total: 790
  - Density: 14.0/sq mi (5.42/km^{2})
- Time zone: UTC-5 (Eastern (EST))
  - Summer (DST): UTC-4 (EDT)
- FIPS code: 36-58266
- GNIS feature ID: 0979369
- Website: https://www.townofpitcairn.com/

Pitcairn is a town in St. Lawrence County, New York, United States. The population was 846 at the 2010 census. The name is from that of Joseph Pitcairn, an early landowner and diplomat.

The Town of Pitcairn is in the southwestern part of the county and is south of Canton.

== History ==
Settlers began to arrive in the area circa 1825 near Portaferry Lake.

Pitcairn was established in 1836 from parts of the Towns of Edwards and Fowler.

== Geography ==
According to the United States Census Bureau, the town has a total area of 59.5 square miles (154 km^{2}), of which 59.0 square miles (153 km^{2}) is land and 0.5 square miles (1.3 km^{2}) (0.84%) is water.

Part of the southern town line is the border of Lewis County. The town is partially in the Adirondack Park.

New York State Route 3 and New York State Route 812 intersect near the south town line.

== Demographics ==
Historical population
Census	Pop.	Note	%±
1840	396		—
1850	503		27.0%
1860	577		14.7%
1870	667		15.6%
1880	790		18.4%
1890	1,108		40.3%
1900	902		−18.6%
1910	316		−65.0%
1920	646		104.4%
1930	570		−11.8%
1940	521		−8.6%
1950	569		9.2%
1960	647		13.7%
1970	676		4.5%
1980	792		17.2%
1990	751		−5.2%
2000	783		4.3%
2010	846		8.0%
2020	790		−6.6%
U.S. Decennial Census

As of the census of 2000, there were 783 people, 295 households, and 233 families residing in the town. The population density was 13.3 people per square mile (5.1 people/km^{2}). There were 412 housing units at an average density of 7.0 units per square mile (2.7 units/km^{2}). The racial makeup of the town was 99.36% White, 0.26% Asian, 0.38% from other races. Hispanic or Latino of any race were 0.64% of the population.

There were 295 households, out of which 39.0% had children under the age of 18 living with them, 64.7% were married couples living together, 6.4% had a female householder with no husband present, and 21.0% were non-families. 17.6% of all households were made up of individuals, and 6.4% had someone living alone who was 65 years of age or older. The average household size was 2.65 and the average family size was 2.92.

In the town, the population was spread out, with 27.2% under the age of 18, 5.6% from 18 to 24, 29.1% from 25 to 44, 28.4% from 45 to 64, and 9.7% who were 65 years of age or older. The median age was 37 years. For every 100 females, there were 114.5 males. For every 100 females age 18 and over, there were 105.8 males.

The median income for a household in the town was $30,089, and the median income for a family was $35,000. Males had a median income of $36,705 versus $26,071 for females. The per capita income for the town was $15,368. About 10.3% of families and 11.7% of the population were below the poverty line, including 10.3% of those under age 18 and 8.0% of those age 65 or over.

== Communities and locations in Pitcairn ==
- Backus – A hamlet south of Pitcairn village.
- Baldface Hill – An elevation north of Pitcairn village.
- Copper Hill – An elevation north of Baldface Hill.
- Geers Corners – A hamlet in the southwestern part of the town, located on NY-812.
- Jayville – A hamlet in the southeastern part of the town, east of Kalurah.
- Kalurah – A hamlet in the southeastern part of the town.
- East Pitcairn – A hamlet in the northeastern part of the town, on County Road 23.
- Pitcairn – The hamlet of Pitcairn is in the central part of the town on NY-3.
- Portaferry Lake – A small lake by the eastern town line.
