= Charles Carnegie, 11th Earl of Southesk =

Scottish nobleman (1893–1992)

The Right Honourable The Earl of Southesk KCVO DL
- Born: 23 September 1893; Edinburgh, Scotland
- Died: 16 February 1992 (aged 98); Brechin, Scotland
- Spouses: Princess Maud (m. 1923; died 1945) Evelyn Julia Williams-Freeman (m. 1952)
- Issue: James Carnegie, 3rd Duke of Fife
- Parents: Charles Carnegie, 10th Earl of Southesk; Ethel Mary Elizabeth Bannerman

Charles Alexander Bannerman Carnegie, 11th Earl of Southesk (23 September 1893 – 16 February 1992), styled The Honourable Charles Carnegie before 1905 and Lord Carnegie between 1905 and 1941, was the husband of Princess Maud, a granddaughter of King Edward VII.

== Early life and marriage ==
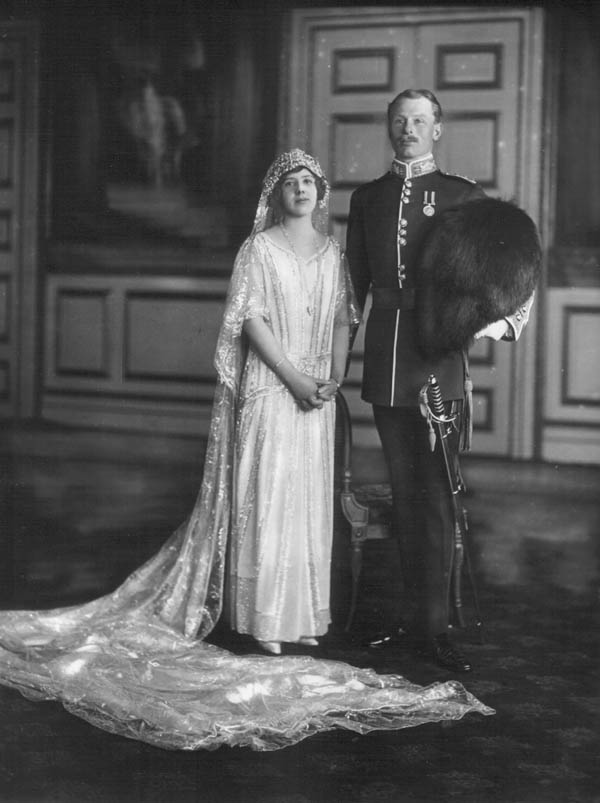
Lord Carnegie and Princess Maud on their wedding day, 12 November 1923

Charles Alexander Carnegie was born on 23 September 1893 in Edinburgh, Scotland. His father was the 10th Earl of Southesk, the son of the 9th Earl of Southesk and Lady Catherine Hamilton Noel. His mother was Ethel Mary Elizabeth Bannerman. When his father succeeded to the earldom in 1905 he was styled Lord Carnegie as the eldest son of the Earl of Southesk. Lord Carnegie was educated at Ludgrove School and Eton College. He later joined the British Army and received a commission in the Scots Guards. In 1917, he served as an aide-de-camp to the Viceroy of India.

On 12 November 1923 he married Princess Maud at the Royal Military Chapel, Wellington Barracks, London. Princess Maud was the younger daughter of the Alexander Duff, 1st Duke of Fife and Louise, Princess Royal. Following their marriage, Princess Maud ceased to use the title of princess and the style Highness (though she was still legally entitled to them) and was known as Lady Maud Carnegie. Together the couple had one child, James George Alexander Bannerman Carnegie, 3rd Duke of Fife, 12th Earl of Southesk (23 September 1929 – 22 June 2015).

Lord Carnegie was a near neighbour of Archibald Maule Ramsay, living in Arbroath, and joined the Right Club, a pro-Nazi group which had been set up by Ramsay, contributing £5 and promising a further £5 annually; he was made a 'Warden' of the club by Ramsay. Asked about his membership in later life, Southesk professed ignorance of all the aims of the club but praised Ramsay as "a very loyal, patriotic man".

== Earl of Southesk ==
The 10th Earl of Southesk died on 10 November 1941 and Lord Carnegie became the 11th Earl of Southesk. Although they did not carry out royal duties, Lord and Lady Southesk were considered members of the Royal Family. They both attended the coronation of King George VI, Maud's cousin, and other state occasions.

== Second marriage ==
Lord Southesk's first wife died on 14 December 1945 from bronchitis. Lord Southesk later married Evelyn Julia Williams-Freeman (27 July 1909 – 30 August 1992) on 16 May 1952 at Scone Palace in Perthshire, Scotland (home of his first cousin Dorothea Carnegie, Countess of Mansfield). Evelyn was the daughter of Lt.-Col. Arthur Peere Williams-Freeman. She previously married in 1933 Major Ion Edward FitzGerald Campbell (1897–1936, a grandson of Sir Edward FitzGerald Campbell, 2nd Bt) and had a son, Ion Edward FitzGerald Campbell (b. 1936), from a posthumous birth. Evelyn, Lady Southesk died aged 83 at Kinnaird Castle, Brechin in Angus, Scotland six months after the death of her husband.

== Death ==
Lord Southesk died on 16 February 1992 at age 98 at his home Kinnaird Castle, Brechin in Angus, Scotland after a brief illness of influenza, having spent the last year of his life as an additional vice-president of the Conservative Monday Club, of which he had long been a member.

His eldest son, James, had already inherited the title of Duke of Fife from his aunt, Princess Alexandra, Duchess of Fife. The title of Earl of Southesk became a subsidiary title of the Duke of Fife, and is used by the duke's heir apparent.

== Honours ==
- Knight Commander of the Royal Victorian Order - 1 January 1926
- Deputy Lieutenant for the County of Kincardineshire - 3 July 1930
- Deputy Lieutenant for the County of Angus, Scotland - 2 October 1947
- Recipient of the King George VI Coronation Medal – 12 May 1937

Peerage of Scotland
Preceded by Charles Carnegie	Earl of Southesk; 1941–1992	Succeeded by James Carnegie
