= The Great Big Radio Show! =

Radio show

The Great Big Radio Show! is a musical comedy, with music and lyrics by Philip Glassborow. Piano arrangements and dance music are by David Rhind-Tutt. Book is by Philip Glassborow with Nick McIvor.

== Synopsis ==
"Radio Show takes place in 1933, in the Radio Building, New York, and the big Saturday night broadcast is just about to go on the air, live. It’s the Great Big Radio Show, a weekly variety program starring Gloria Pilbeam. The only trouble is—she can’t be found. Bandleader Blue Woodward has to find a replacement while the show is actually on the air... without letting the sponsor know what’s going on... and in spite of some desperate hoodlums in the studio."

== Production history ==
In 1989, the show won a special prize in the Vivian Ellis Awards, a contest established by the UK Performing Right Society to promote achievement in British musical theater, and to honor the composer of West End hits such as Mr Cinders and Bless The Bride. The Awards panel included Tim Rice, Don Black, Cameron Mackintosh, Petula Clark and Sheridan Morley. Veteran songwriter Vivian Ellis himself publicly declared it “a musical to fall in love with"

After the Ellis Awards, Radio Show was one of seven musicals selected from a field of 491 for a workshop as part of the inaugural season of the UK Quest for New Musicals. Andrew Lloyd Webber was Patron of the Quest and Richard Stilgoe was its director. The workshop culminated in a staged reading at Buxton Opera House directed and choreographed by Angela Hardcastle, starring Paul Jones, Elizabeth Counsell and Peter Goodwright.

At that point, the musical came to the attention of Jill Fraser, Artistic and Executive Director of the Watermill Theatre in Newbury, Berkshire. Although small, the Watermill is one of the UK's most prominent regional stages. The company nurtured several new musicals before mounting a renowned series of revivals under director/designer John Doyle. For her 1993 Fall Season, Fraser produced the professional premiere of Radio Show, again directed by Hardcastle and featuring many of the Buxton cast. The Times and The Independent acclaimed the show and critic Sheridan Morley (one of the Ellis Awards judges) reviewed it for the International Herald Tribune. He praised the musical as “an immensely loving and knowledgeable parody of the big-band shows of American airwaves”.

The sold-out run of Radio Show at the Watermill raised expectations of a West End transfer, and veteran producer Harold Fielding optioned the rights. Fielding, whose successes included Half a Sixpence on Broadway and in the West End, was in his seventies at the time; sadly, soon after acquiring the rights, he became ill and production plans were suspended. For a number of years, Radio Show lay fallow as Fielding, though in decline, continued exercising his options.

In Fall 2005, the musical was presented off-Broadway by the York Theatre Company in their Musicals in Mufti series, produced by James Morgan. The director was David Glenn Armstrong and the stellar cast included Nancy Anderson, Ed Dixon, Tyler Maynard, Seth Rudetsky, David Staller and Lynne Wintersteller.

“Manhattan, of course, is the native turf of the musical comedies that Radio Show is spoofing. It’s tempting to reach for a wisecrack about carrying coals to Newcastle; but audiences are likely to find that this heartfelt musical comedy feels right at home in the hometown of Rodgers and Hart.”

== Musical Numbers ==
- Overture
- Unmistakably
- She Ain't Here Yet
- Surprises
- Nourishvite Jingle
- No Matter What
- Where Have I Seen You Before?
- Pretty As A Picture
- Suddenly I'm Singing
- You Came By
- I Felt Myself Falling
- Then I Bumped into You
- You Take My Breath Away
- Your Turn For A Rainbow
- The Balalaika
- Tomorrow Is Another Day
- Me And My Stradivarius
