= Half in Earnest =

Half in Earnest is a musical comedy by Vivian Ellis adapted from The Importance of Being Earnest and other works of Oscar Wilde.

It premiered at the Bucks County Playhouse in Pennsylvania and the Olney Theatre in Maryland in 1957, featuring Anna Russell. The following year, a production opened the Belgrade Theatre, Coventry on March 27, 1958.
