= Bless the Bride =

Musical by Vivian Ellis and A. P. Herbert

- Original cast album cover
- Music: Vivian Ellis
- Lyrics: A. P. Herbert
- Book: A. P. Herbert
- Productions: 1947 West End; 1987 Off-West End revival

Bless the Bride is a musical with music by Vivian Ellis and a book and lyrics by A. P. Herbert, the third of five musicals they wrote together. The story is about an English girl who elopes with a debonair French actor; he goes off to serve in the Franco-Prussian War, and his friend, who bears a grudge against the English, tells his bride that he has been killed in action. The musical is remembered as Ellis's best work and for the recordings of "This is my lovely day" and "I was never kissed before", with the original stars Lizbeth Webb and Georges Guétary.

The original production opened at the Adelphi Theatre in London on 26 April 1947 and ran for 886 performances. A revival was presented in London as Sadler's Wells Theatre in 1987.

== Original production ==
The show was Charles B. Cochran's 125th production. Cochran had signed 19-year-old Adele Leigh as the lead, but the next day the new Royal Opera offered her principal roles. After much negotiation, Cochran released her from the contract and hired Lizbeth Webb.

The musical opened at the Adelphi Theatre in London on 26 April 1947, just before Oklahoma!, and was directed by Wendy Toye. It was not overshadowed by the American hit, enjoying a good reception from the critics and audiences, and running for three years and a total of 886 performances. The production was notable for its highly stylised scenery by Tanya Moiseiwitsch, a break with the realism of earlier musical comedy sets. One of Webb's songs with Guétary, "This Is My Lovely Day", became one of the BBC's most requested songs of all times, and the song's popularity, and that of the show, were increased by their association with the wedding in 1947 of Princess Elizabeth and Lt. Philip Mountbatten.

Only four of the songs were recorded as studio singles by the original cast. A "disappointing" studio recording was made in 1967 with Mary Millar and Roberto Cardinali, In 1994, a recording of songs by the original cast was released, produced by David Cunard, as a result of a discovery in the United States of recordings of a radio broadcast.

== Synopsis ==
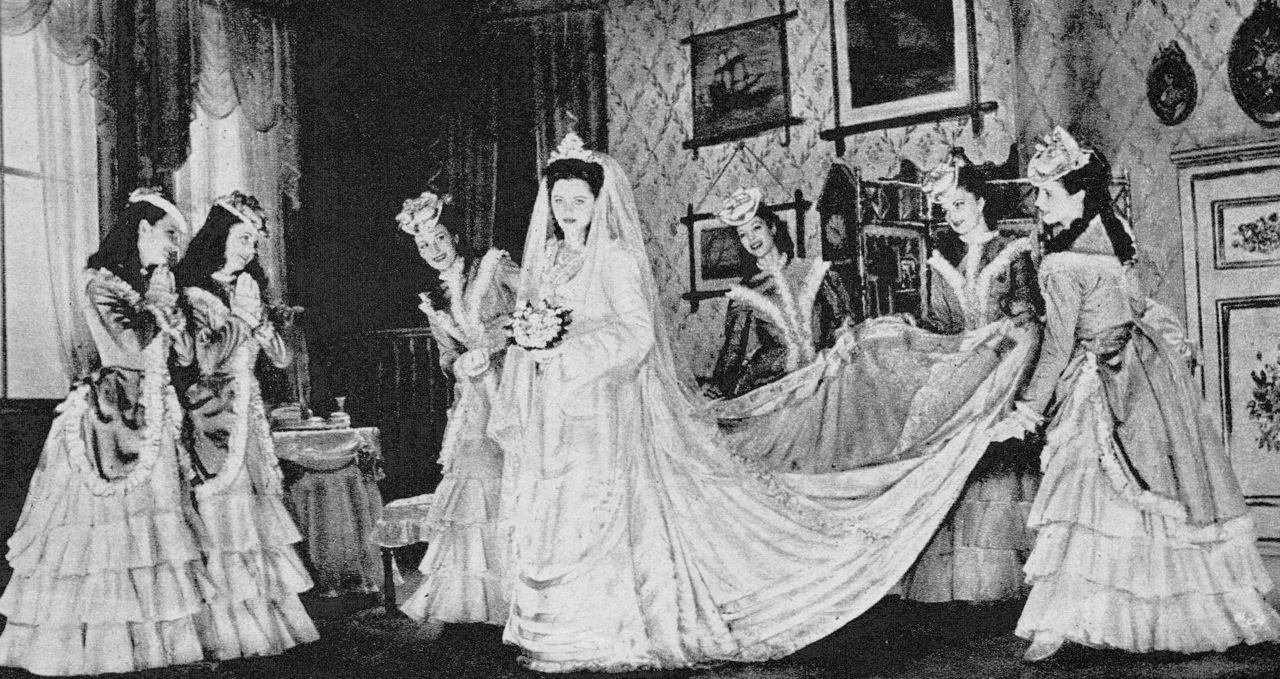
Lucy Willow and sisters prepare for the wedding

Act I

In Victorian England, it is 1870, the eve of the Franco-Prussian War, and a young woman, Lucy Veracity Willow, is having second thoughts about her imminent marriage to the Hon. Thomas Trout. He will not join her in her favourite game of croquet, preferring the "shocking" new game of lawn tennis ("Croquet, Croquet" / "What Will Mother Say"). Worse, he makes good-natured but pointed fun of her principles, especially her attachment to the truth ("Too Good to Be True"). She is resigned to her duty to marry the man approved by her parents, but bemoans the lack of love in their relationship ("Any Man but Thomas T."). Thomas introduces Lucy to a couple of new French friends of his, the debonair and romantic Pierre Fontaine, an actor, and his companion Suzanne, who is also on the stage. Lucy and Pierre quickly fall in love ("I Was Never Kissed Before"), much to Suzanne's chagrin, and they elope to France together in the middle of the elaborate preparations for Lucy and Thomas' wedding ("Bless the Bride").

Set for Act II, showing the highly stylised design of the production

Act II

In France, Pierre and Lucy are with Suzanne, who seems to be overcoming her initial jealousy of Lucy and is acting as chaperone until the couple can be married ("Mon Pauvre Petit Pierre"). The three take a table in a beachside restaurant ("A Table for Two" / "This Is My Lovely Day"). Into the restaurant crash Lucy's father, mother, cousin George, and the jilted Thomas, who is determined to fight a duel with Pierre if they can find him ("The Englishman"). They have come to "rescue" Lucy, and to this end have adopted disguises (including heavy beards). Their efforts to pass themselves off as French arouse suspicions, and Lucy and Suzanne have to step in to vouch for the party, saving them from arrest as Prussian spies. Lucy declares her love for Pierre to her family, and Thomas confronts Pierre. Dramatic news arrives of the declaration of the Franco-Prussian War. Pierre is a reserve officer and must leave at once to join his regiment. Suzanne and the exultant French crowd leave with him ("To France") – while poor Lucy must return to England with her family.

A year passes, and it is Lucy's twenty-first birthday ("Here's a Kiss"). A message has arrived from Suzanne telling her that Pierre was killed in the disastrous war. A chastened Thomas renews his suit for Lucy's hand. She tells him that she cannot forget Pierre but will marry him if he does not rush the date of the wedding. Suzanne shows up, interrupting the birthday party. She admits that, resentful of the English, she had cruelly lied about Pierre, who is alive and here! Lucy is ecstatic, but Pierre is concerned when he sees Thomas's ring. However, Thomas nobly removes it and hands it to Pierre ("My Big Moment"), and the lovers can at last marry with everyone's approval ("This Is My Lovely Day" (reprise)).

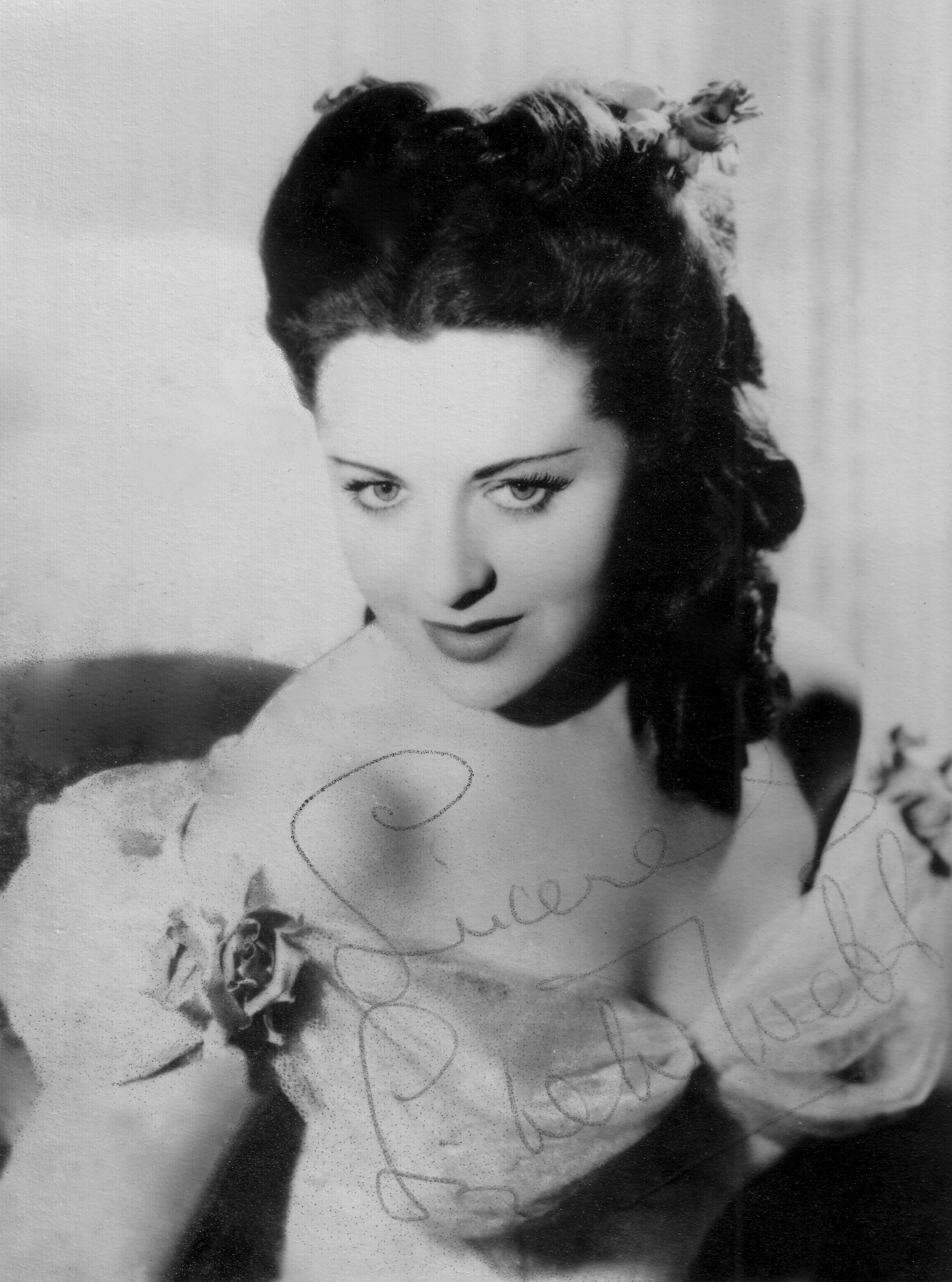
Lizbeth Webb in white gown from "Bless the Bride"

== Roles and original cast ==
- Lucy Willow – Lizbeth Webb
- Alice, Ann, Charlotte, Elizabeth, Frances and Millicent, her sisters – Diana Beall, Joan Elvin, Pamela Carroll, Winifred Hammick, Mildred Griffiths and Natasha Wills
- Mary Willow their mother – Edna Clement
- Augustus Willow, their father – Eric Fort
- Suzanne Valdis, an actress – Betty Paul
- Thomas Trout – Brian Reece
- Pierre Fontaine, an actor – Georges Guétary
- Nanny – Anona Winn
- Albert Willow, Lucy's grandfather – James Harcourt
- Harriet Willow, Lucy's grandmother – Hebe Bliss
- Cousin George – Stewart Vartan
- Monsieur Robert, maitre d'hôte, Café des Pommes – Peter Lupino

== Musical numbers ==
Act I

- Croquet, Croquet – Company
- Too Good to Be True – Thomas and Lucy
- Any Man But Thomas T. – Lucy
- Oh, What will Mother Say – Lucy's sisters
- En Angleterre, les Demoiselles – Suzanne, Pierre and Thomas with Chorus
- I Was Never Kissed Before – Lucy and Pierre
- Where Is the Times? – Augustus with Family and Chorus
- Come, Dance, My Dear (Marry Me) – Chorus
- God Bless the Family – Ensemble
- Ma Belle Marguerite – Pierre and Chorus
- The Silent Heart – Lucy
- Ducky – Lucy and her Nanny
- Bless the Bride (Finale Act 1) – Company

Act II

- Bobbing, Bobbing – French maidens
- Bless the Sea – Girls and Lucy
- Mon Pauvre Petit Pierre – Suzanne, Lucy and Pierre
- The Englishman – Thomas and Family
- A Table for Two – Pierre
- This Is My Lovely Day – Lucy and Pierre
- The Fish – The Family, Waiters and Chorus
- This Man Could Never Be a Spy – Lucy and Suzanne
- To France – Pierre and Chorus
- Twenty-one Candles (Ducky) Nanny and Sisters
- Here's a Kiss – Lucy's sisters
- My Big Moment – Thomas
- Summer – Lucy
- Finale – Company

== Sadler's Wells Theatre 1987 revival ==
The first London professional revival of Bless The Bride, at Sadler's Wells Theatre in 1987, was co-produced by the theatre with Noel Pearson. This 40th anniversary production was directed by Christopher Renshaw and choreographed by Gillian Gregory. It ran for 54 performances, with previews from 8 August and an official opening on 11 August. Jan Hartley starred as Lucy, and Bernard Alane played Pierre. Una Stubbs was Mary, Gerald Harper was Augustus, Ruth Madoc was Suzanne, Simon Williams was Thomas, Jean Challis was Nanny and Jeremy Sinden was George. The show's intended to transfer to the West End fell through, and it sustained a loss of £600,000.
