= Colin Campbell (British Army officer, born 1754) =

Lieutenant-General Colin Campbell

Governor of Gibraltar
- In office 1809–1814
- Preceded by: Sir John Cradock
- Succeeded by: Sir George Don

Personal details
- Born: 21 November 1754 Edinburgh, Scotland
- Died: 2 April 1814 (aged 59)
- Spouse: Mary Johnston
- Relations: Sir Guy Campbell (son)

Military service
- Allegiance: United Kingdom
- Branch/service: British Army
- Years of service: 1771–1814
- Rank: Lieutenant-general
- Commands: 6th Regiment of Foot; Limerick Military District
- Battles/wars: American Revolutionary War; French Revolutionary Wars; West Indies campaign; Battle of Martinique; Invasion of Guadeloupe; Irish Rebellion; Battle of Vinegar Hill; Battle of Castlebar; Napoleonic Wars; Peninsular War; Siege of Tarifa

Lieutenant-General Colin Campbell (21 November 1754 – 2 April 1814) was Lieutenant Governor of Gibraltar.

== Early life ==
Campbell was born in Edinburgh on 21 November 1754. He was the son of John Campbell, First Cashier of the Royal Bank of Scotland, and Anne Carolina Campbell, herself a daughter of landowner James Campbell of Tofts.

His father was an illegitimate son of the Hon. Colin Campbell of Ardmaddie, a son of John Campbell, 1st Earl of Breadalbane and Holland by his second marriage to the former Mary Sinclair, Countess of Caithness (née Lady Mary Campbell), the widow of George Sinclair, 6th Earl of Caithness who was a daughter of Archibald Campbell, 1st Marquess of Argyll).

== Military career ==
Campbell was commissioned into the 71st Regiment of Foot in 1771 and then transferred to the 6th Regiment of Foot in 1783. In 1796 he went to Ireland and two years later fought at the Battle of Vinegar Hill.

In 1810 he was appointed Lieutenant Governor of Gibraltar. During the Peninsular War he insisted on keeping Gibraltar well garrisoned and also regarded Tarifa as within his command and denied it to the French invading force there.

== Personal life ==
Campbell was married to Mary Johnson (c. 1764–1832), a daughter of Guy Johnson and Mary "Polly" Johnson (the daughter of Sir William Johnson, 1st Baronet). Together, they were the parents of:

- Sir Guy Campbell, 1st Baronet (1786–1849), who married Frances Elizabeth Burgoyne in 1817. After her death in 1818, he married Pamela FitzGerald, the eldest daughter of Lord Edward FitzGerald and Pamela Syms in 1820.
- John Campbell (1788–1841), he was appointed Companion, Order of the Bath.
- William Johnson Campbell (1789–1854), who married Anna Maria Vincent, a daughter of Sir Francis Vincent, 8th Baronet, in 1817.
- Mary Campbell (1791–1841)
- Colin Alexander Campbell (1793–1860), a Reverend who married Hon. Beatrice Charlotte Byng, daughter of John Byng, 5th Viscount Torrington, in 1820.
- Anne Carolina Julia Campbell (1795–1815), who married George Cholmondeley, 2nd Marquess of Cholmondeley in 1812. After her death in 1815, he married Lady Susan Caroline Somerset, a daughter of the 6th Duke of Beaufort.
- James Thomas Campbell (1800–1866), a Reverend who was Rector at Tilston.
- Julia Arabella Maria Campbell (1803–1880)
- William Frederick Campbell (1808–1846)
- Maria Louisa Campbell (1815–1888)

Campbell died on 2 April 1814. His son Guy was created a Baronet in his honour in 1815.

=== Descendants ===
Through his son William, he was a grandfather of Mary Caroline Campbell (1820–1876), who married Andrés Avelino de Silva y Fernández de Córdoba (younger son of the 12th Duke of Híjar. Mary and William were the parents of Alfonso de Silva y Campbell, 15th Duke of Híjar.

Government offices
Preceded by Sir John Cradock	Governor of Gibraltar (acting); 1809–1814	Succeeded by Sir George Don
