= Sir Guy Campbell, 5th Baronet =

British soldier

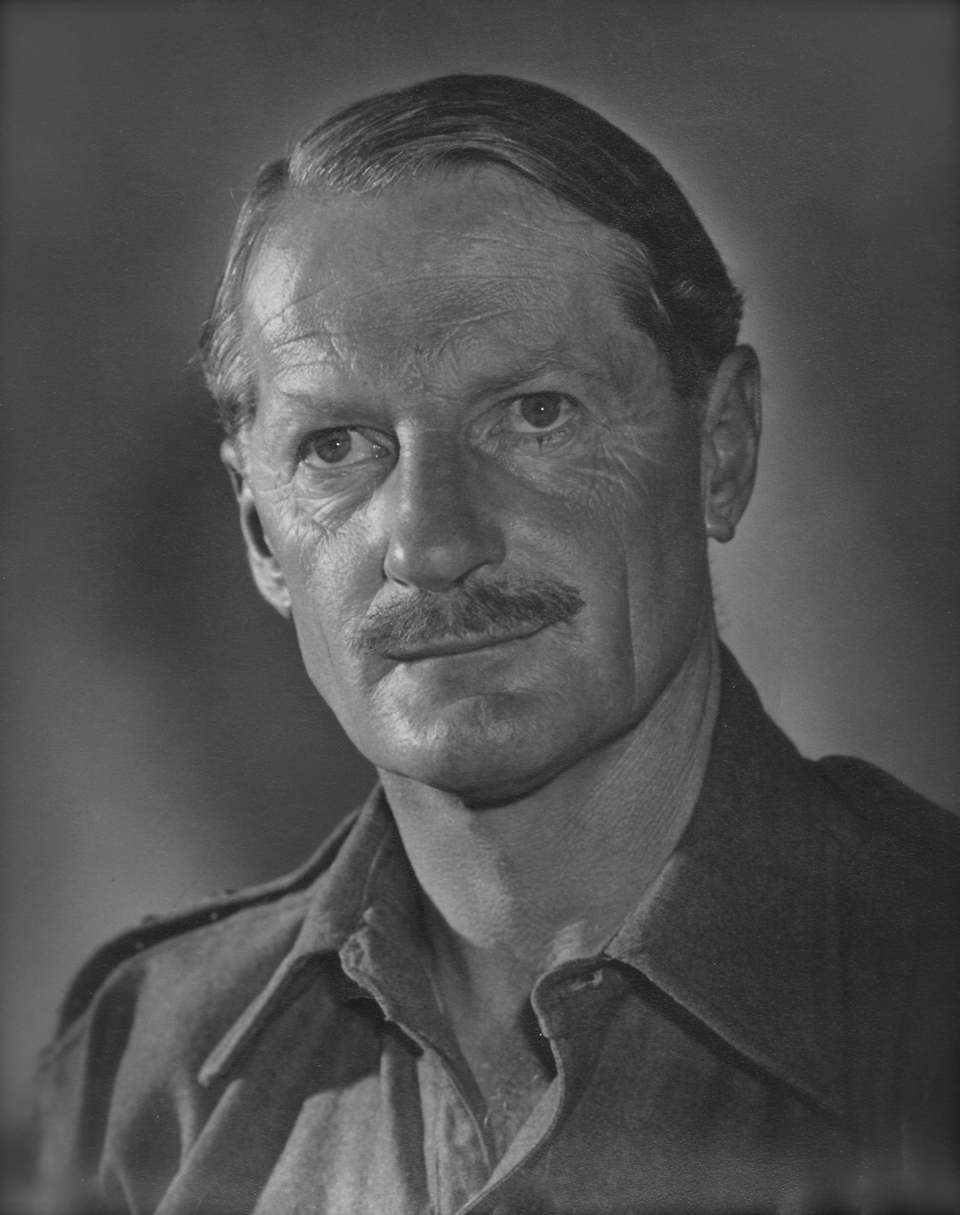
Guy Campbell in Kenya, 1953

Colonel Sir Guy Theophilus Halswell Campbell, 5th Baronet OBE, MC (18 January 1910 – 19 July 1993) was a British soldier. Sir Guy's branch of the Campbell baronets, of St Cross Mede, were created in 1815 with Sir Guy Campbell, 1st Baronet.

== Background ==
He was the eldest son of Sir Guy Colin Campbell, 4th Baronet and his first wife Mary Arabella Swinnerton Kemeys-Tynte, daughter of Halswell Milborne Kemeys-Tynte. In 1960, he succeeded his father as baronet. Campbell was educated at St. Aubyns Preparatory School, Rottingdean, Eton College and the University of St Andrews.

== Career ==
Campbell was commissioned into the King's Own Yorkshire Light Infantry in 1932. With the outbreak of the Second World War in 1939, he was attached to the Camel Corps of the Sudan Defence Force, commanding the 2nd and 7th Nuba Battalions. Serving in Abyssinia, he was wounded and received the Military Cross in 1941. A year later he was promoted to captain and in 1945, he acted as brigadier in the Force's headquarter. Campbell was sent to the British embassy in Cairo as adviser to Ralph Bunche and to Folke Bernadotte in 1948 and subsequently was despatched to Ethiopia, where he was awarded a gold medal by Emperor Haile Selassie. In 1951, he was transferred to the King's Royal Rifle Corps.

He was appointed to command the Kenya Regiment at the beginning of the Mau Mau Uprising in 1952. Campbell was made an Officer of the Order of the British Empire and was promoted to lieutenant-colonel in 1954. After another two years he was appointed head of the military mission in Libya until 1960. He was put on the reserve list in August and was granted an honorary colonelship. Five years later, having reached the age limit, he retired.

== Family ==
On 17 August 1956, he married the musical comedy star Lizbeth Webb (whose real name was Elizabeth Holton). They had two sons: Lachlan Philip Kemeys Campbell, an artist and illustrator (Eton Colours, When It Happened in Scotland, and When It Happened in Britain), born in 1958, who has three children, Archie, Georgia and Ivo; and Rory Charles Fitzgerald Campbell, an opera singer and actor who owns the entertainment company Encore Management Ltd., born in 1961, who has a daughter, Olivia.

When Campbell died at the age of 83, he was succeeded in the baronetcy by his elder son Lachlan.

=== Arms ===
Coat of arms of Sir Guy Campbell, 5th Baronet
Crest A boar's head erased or langued gules. Escutcheon Quarterly 1st and 4th, Gyronny of eight or and sable 2nd, argent a lymphad sails furled and oars in action sable 3rd, Or a fess chequy azure and argent all within a bordure embattled ermine. Motto Over the crest

== Works ==
- The Charging Buffalo: A History of the Kenyan Regiment 1937–1963 (1986, Leo Cooper; ISBN 0-436-08290-X)

Baronetage of the United Kingdom
Preceded by Guy Colin Campbell	Baronet (of St Cross Mede); 1960 – 1993	Succeeded by Lachlan Campbell
