= Philip Glassborow =

Playwright, lyricist and composer

Philip Glassborow is a playwright, lyricist and composer who writes for theatre, radio and television. His best-known theatre musical is The Great Big Radio Show! (music and lyrics) with book in collaboration with Nick McIvor, which was premiered by the Watermill Theatre in Newbury, showcased at the Bridewell Theatre in London, and had additional exposure via the off-Broadway York Theatre Company Musicals in Mufti series (2005), and Malta’s National Theatre, Teatru Manoel (2014).

Other theatre credits include a new musical version of Peter Pan by J. M. Barrie (Watermill Theatre, Newbury and Yvonne Arnaud Theatre, Guildford) and A Kid for Two Farthings (lyrics) with music by Cyril Ornadel and book in collaboration with Robert Meadwell, based on the novel by Wolf Mankowitz.

For BBC Radio, Glassborow compiled and presented The Gorey Details based on the work of Edward Gorey, which starred Frank Langella, Katherine Kellgren, Andreas Brown and David Suchet. He has dramatized many classic books for radio including Billy Budd, Sailor by Herman Melville; Christopher Himself based on Prater Violet by Christopher Isherwood (which starred David Suchet, Adam Godley and Bernard Cribbins, and featured an interview with Don Bachardy); The Secret Garden by Frances Hodgson Burnett (starring Dame Joan Plowright, Ron Moody and Prunella Scales); and Silas Marner by George Eliot (starring Michael Williams, Jenny Agutter, Alex Jennings and Edward Woodward). His dramatisation of Anthony Trollope's short story "Christmas Day At Kirkby Cottage" starred Finty Williams, John Rhys-Davies and Julia McKenzie.

In 2014, to commemorate the 60th anniversary of the Red Cross inspection of Theresienstadt Concentration Camp, Glassborow was commissioned by director Adam Forde to write a new music theatre piece, Welcome To Terezin. The play was presented at the Edinburgh Festival.

Glassborow's musical play Star Of Strait Street premiered as part of Valletta 2018, European Capital of Culture in May 2018. The play was previewed with the support of the Mackintosh Foundation for Malta's EU 2017 Presidency Arts Celebrations, at the Splendid Cultural Incubation Centre as part of the Strada Stretta Concept under the artistic direction of Giuseppe Schembri Bonaci.
