= Ma Belle Marguerite =

"Ma Belle Marguerite" is a song with music by Vivian Ellis and lyric by AP Herbert, which was a great success in the musical Bless the Bride, being sung by Georges Guétary, playing the part of French actor Pierre Fontaine.
