= Sir Guy Campbell, 1st Baronet =

British Army general

Major-General Sir Guy Campbell Bt CB
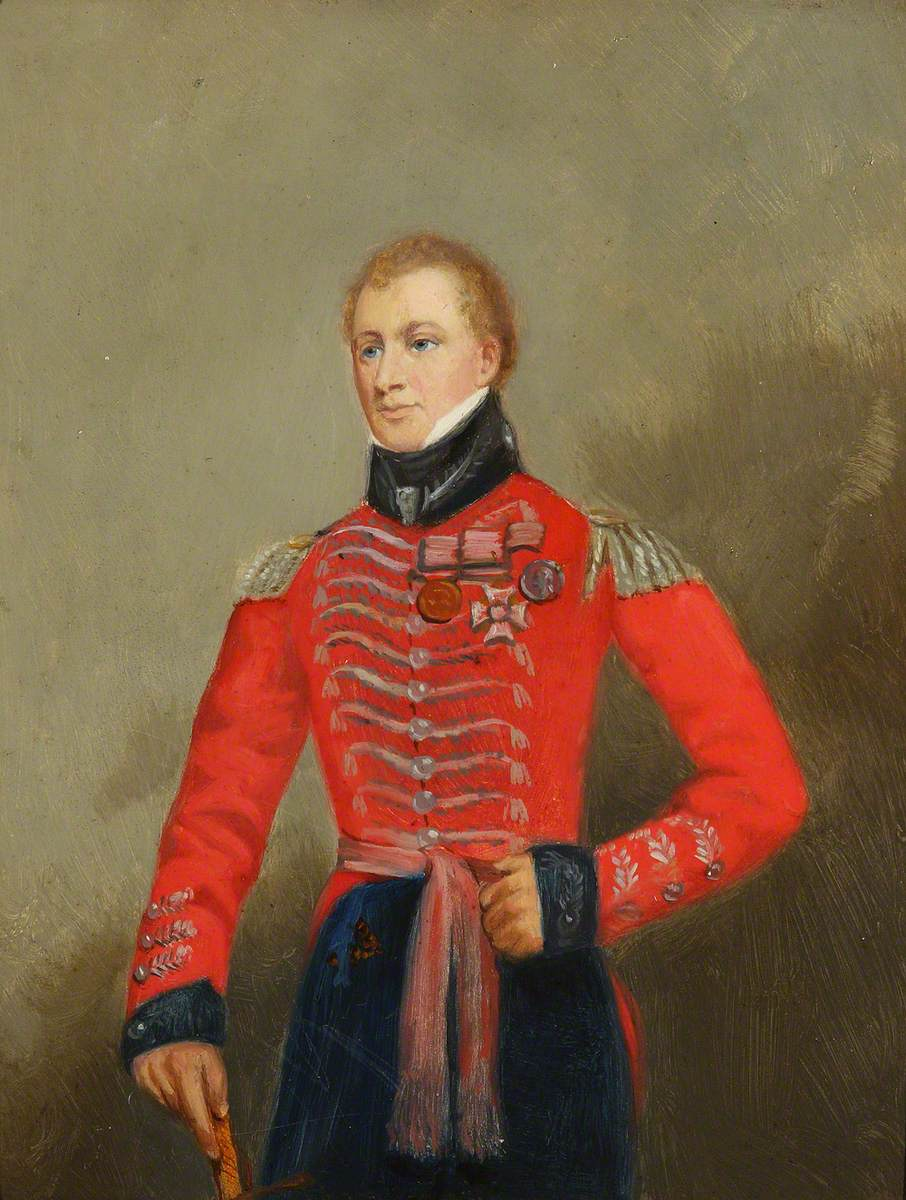
- Portrait by an unknown artist, c. 1812–1820
- Born: 22 January 1786
- Died: 26 January 1849 (aged 63)
- Spouse: Lady Pamela Campbell
- Military career
- Allegiance: United Kingdom
- Branch: British Army
- Service years: 1795–1849
- Unit: 6th Regiment of Foot
- Conflicts: French Revolutionary Wars; Irish Rebellion of 1798; Napoleonic Wars; Peninsular War; Battle of Roliça; Battle of Vimeiro; Battle of Corunna; Battle of Vitoria; Battle of the Pyrenees (WIA); Hundred Days; Battle of Waterloo
- Awards: Companion of the Order of the Bath; Army Gold Medal

Major-General Sir Guy Campbell, 1st Baronet, CB (22 January 1786 – 26 January 1849) was a British Army officer. His branch of the Campbell baronets is referred to as St Cross Mede.

== Early life ==
Campbell was born on 22 January 1786. He was the eldest son of Lieutenant-General Colin Campbell and his wife Mary Johnson. Among his siblings were William Johnson Campbell (who married Anna Maria Vincent, a daughter of Sir Francis Vincent, 8th Baronet), Rev. Colin Alexander Campbell (who married Hon. Beatrice Charlotte Byng, daughter of the 5th Viscount Torrington), and Anne Carolina Julia Campbell (first wife of George Cholmondeley, 2nd Marquess of Cholmondeley).

His maternal grandparents were Guy Johnson and Mary "Polly" Johnson (the daughter of Sir William Johnson, 1st Baronet). His paternal grandparents were John Campbell, First Cashier of the Royal Bank of Scotland, and Anne Carolina Campbell (a daughter of landowner James Campbell of Tofts). His paternal grandfather was an illegitimate son of the Hon. Colin Campbell of Ardmaddie, a son of John Campbell, 1st Earl of Breadalbane and Holland by his second marriage to the former Mary Sinclair, Countess of Caithness (née Lady Mary Campbell), the widow of George Sinclair, 6th Earl of Caithness who was a daughter of Archibald Campbell, 1st Marquess of Argyll).

== Career ==
Campbell entered the army as an ensign in the 6th Regiment of Foot in 1795, of which his father was then lieutenant-colonel, and was promoted lieutenant on 4 April 1796. He served in all the regiment's engagements under his father's command during the Irish Rebellion of 1798. Campbell, with the rest of the regiment, went to Canada in 1803, and he was promoted captain on 14 September 1804. (By this time, his father had been promoted to major-general and held a command in Ireland).

Campbell again saw action with the 6th during the Peninsular War, fighting at Roliça and Vimeiro, and taking part in the advance and retreat of Sir John Moore. Promoted major on 1 April 1813, Campbell and the 6th fought at Vitoria (21 June 1813), and owing to the wounding of the colonel, took command of the regiment. During the subsequent campaigns, Campbell led the 6th during the Battle of the Pyrenees, and was badly wounded while leading the regiment, on 2 August 1813, to the storming of the Heights of Echalar, a feat which won the commendation of Wellington for the regiment. Campbell was breveted lieutenant-colonel on 26 August 1813 as a result.

After the war, he received a gold medal for his conduct at the Battle of the Pyrenees and was awarded the CB. He was created a baronet on 22 May 1815 in recognition of the services of his father, the remainder being to his father's heirs-male. He rejoined the 6th in 1815, and served as a staff officer at the Battle of Waterloo, going on half-pay in 1816.

Campbell was appointed deputy quartermaster-general in Ireland in 1830, and was promoted major-general in 1841, receiving command of the Athlone district. On 24 October 1848, he was appointed colonel of the 3rd West India Regiment.

== Personal life ==
On 17 January 1817, Sir Guy married Frances Elizabeth Burgoyne, daughter of Montagu Burgoyne. Before her death on 8 May 1818, they were the parents of one daughter:

- Frances Elizabeth Campbell (c. 1818–1893), who married Col. Henry Boys Harvey in 1840.

On 21 November 1820, Sir Guy remarried to Pamela FitzGerald (c. 1795–1869), the eldest daughter of Lord Edward FitzGerald (fifth son of the Duke of Leinster) and Pamela Syms. By her he had four sons, of whom one died in infancy, and six daughters, including:

- Madeline Caroline Frances Eden Campbell (d. 1920), who married Hon. Percy Scawen Wyndham, son of George Wyndham, 1st Baron Leconfield, in 1860.
- Pamela Louisa Campbell (d. 1859), who married Rev. Charles Stuart Stanford in 1841.
- Georgina Geneviève Louisa Campbell (d. 1899), who married Capt. Thomas Henry Preston in 1847.
- Lucy Sophia Julia Campbell (d. 1898), who married General Sir Edward Selby Smyth in 1848.
- Julia Elizabeth Henrietta Campbell (d. 1910), who married Maj.-Gen. Fitzroy William Fremantle, son of Maj.-Gen. John Fremantle, in 1862.
- Sir Edward Fitzgerald Campbell, 2nd Baronet (1822–1882), a Colonel who married Georgiana Charlotte Theophila Metcalfe, daughter of Sir Thomas Metcalfe, 4th Baronet, in 1853.
- John Campbell (b. c. 1824), who died as an infant.
- Guy Colin Campbell (1824–1853), a Lieutenant in the Royal Navy who died unmarried.
- Emily Campbell (c. 1833–1924), who married Maj. Charles David Cunynghame Ellis, son of Lt.-Col. Hon. Augustus Frederick Ellis (a son of the 1st Baron Seaford), in 1859.
- Frederick Augustus Campbell (1839–1916), a Captain who married Emma Mary Brabazon, daughter of Maj. Hugh Brabazon, in 1862.
- Mary Louisa Campbell (1849–1897), who married Maj. William Frederick Carleton in 1867.

Sir Guy died in 1849 at Dún Laoghaire after a long illness and is buried at Collins Barracks, then known as the Royal Barracks, in Dublin.

=== Descendants ===
Sir Guy's descendant, Sir Guy Campbell, 5th Baronet, was baronet from 1960 until his death in 1993, and the current baronet, Lachlan Campbell, is his son.

== Arms ==
Coat of arms of Sir Guy Campbell, 1st Baronet
Crest A boar's head erased or langued gules. Escutcheon Quarterly 1st and 4th, Gyronny of eight or and sable 2nd, argent a lymphad sails furled and oars in action sable 3rd, Or a fess chequy azure and argent all within a bordure embattled ermine. Motto Over the crest

Military offices
Preceded by Sir Charles William Maxwell	Colonel of the 3rd West India Regiment; 1848–1849	Succeeded by Sir William Wood
Peerage of the United Kingdom
New creation	Baronet (of St Cross Mede, Hants); 1815–1849	Succeeded by Edward Campbell
