= Lady Edward FitzGerald =

Wife of Irish revolutionary leader, Lord Edward FitzGerald

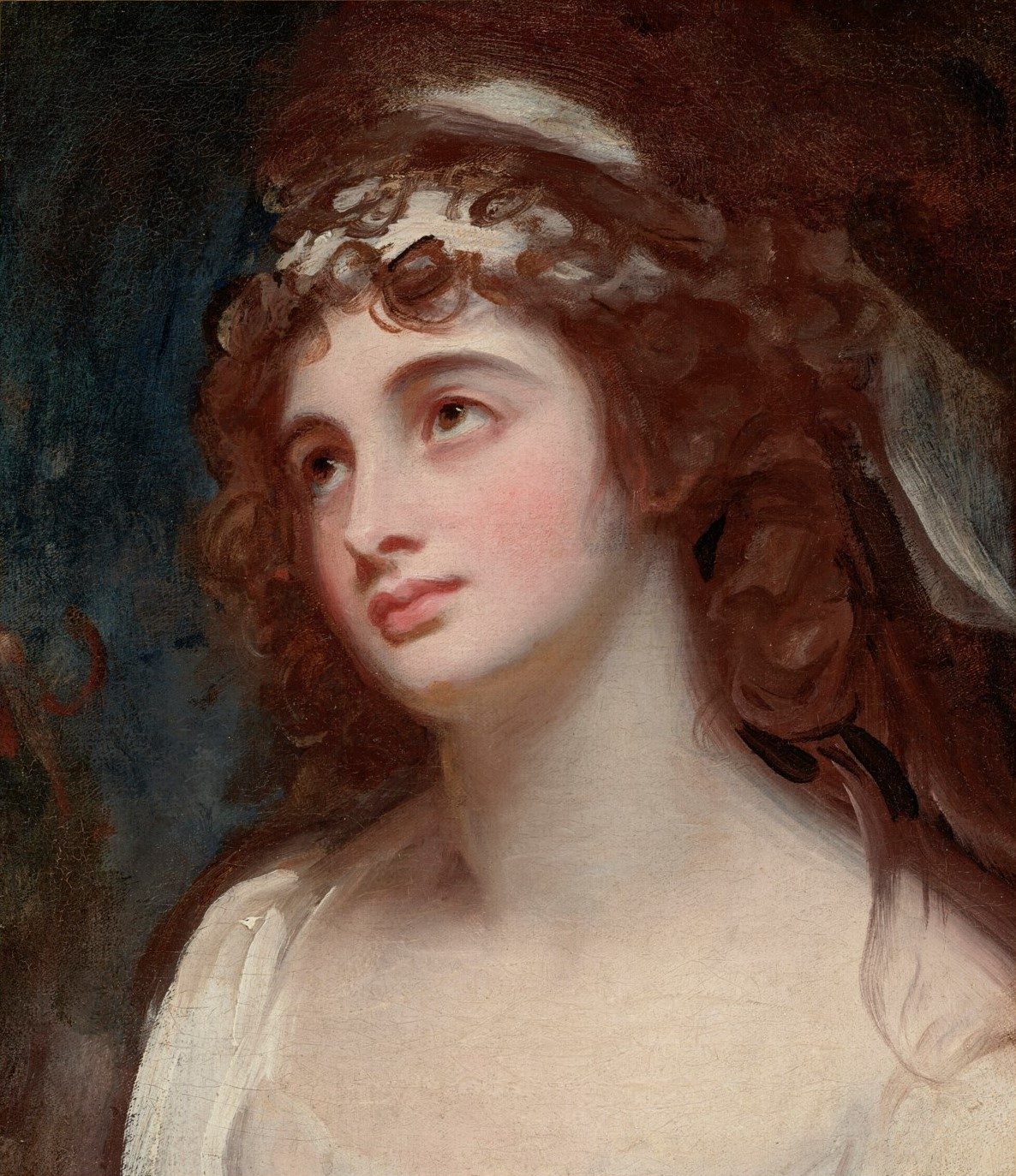
- Pamela, later Lady Edward Fitzgerald (1773-1831), painting by George Romney
- Born: Pamela Syms; 1773; Fogo, Newfoundland
- Died: September 1831 (aged 57–58)

Stéphanie Caroline Anne Syms, Lady Edward FitzGerald (c. 1773 – 9 November 1831), known as Pamela, was the wife of Lord Edward FitzGerald, the radical revolutionary and leading United Irishman, and was herself an enthusiastic supporter of Irish independence, scarcely less celebrated at the time than her husband.

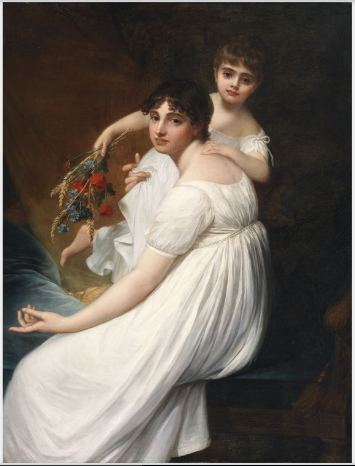
Lady Pamela FitzGerald and her daughter, Lady Pamela Campbell

Her origins are uncertain. She was described as an adopted daughter of Félicité de Genlis; it is usually assumed that she was an unacknowledged daughter of Madame de Genlis and Louis Philip II, Duke of Orléans. However, according to her marriage registration, she was born on Fogo, Newfoundland, the illegitimate daughter of Guillaume de Brixey and Mary Sims, and was taken to England, where she ended up in the Genlis household.

During the French Revolution, the Genlis family fled to England. By then an attractive young woman, she became engaged to Richard Sheridan, but the engagement was quickly ended. She instead married Edward FitzGerald at Tournai on 27 December 1792. They settled at his home in Kildare and had three children: Edward Fox (1794–1863); Pamela, afterwards wife of General Sir Guy Campbell; Lucy Louisa, who married Captain Lyon, RN.

As the country seethed with rebellion, FitzGerald was hunted by the government and forced into hiding. He was betrayed a few days before the date set for the planned rising he was to lead and was wounded resisting arrest on 19 May 1798. Although his wound was to the shoulder and relatively minor it was left untreated and he died of his wounds on 5 June. Deemed a traitor to the British crown, his estates were confiscated, and his widow was compelled to leave the country to avoid possible charges of treason.

Lady Edward fled to Hamburg, where, in 1800, she wed Joseph Pitcairn, the American consul to Hamburg. They had a daughter, Helen (1803-1896). Although she had been greatly beloved and esteemed by the whole FitzGerald family, her intimacy with them ceased after her second marriage. She remained to the last passionately devoted to Irish freedom and to the memory of her first husband. She died in November 1831 in Paris.

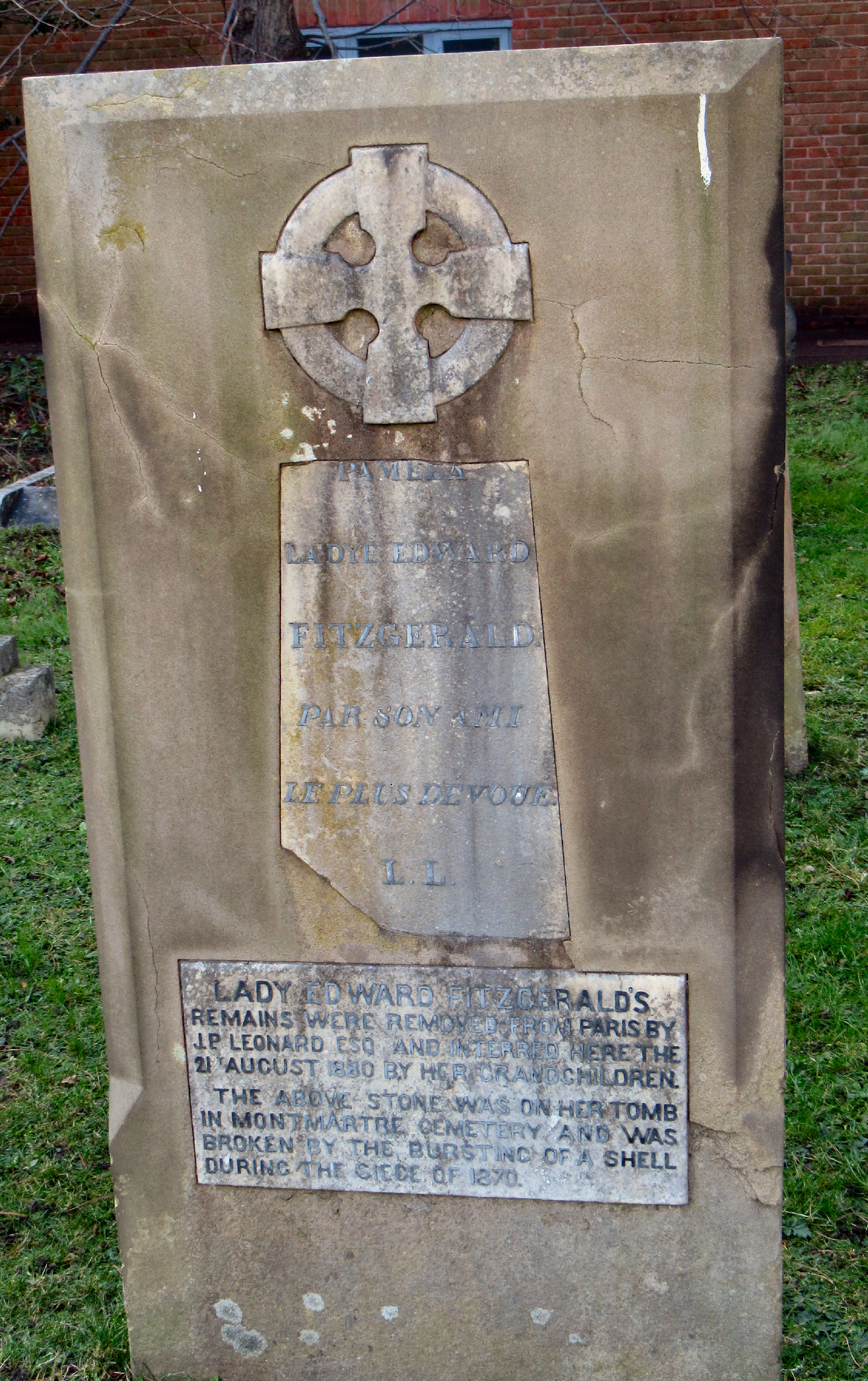
Lady Edward FitzGerald's memorial, St Nicholas' Church

During the Franco-Prussian War, her gravestone was damaged, so in 1880 her remains were brought back to England and were buried in the churchyard of St Nicholas, Thames Ditton, Surrey, with her elder daughter, Pamela (Lady Guy Campbell). The damaged gravestone can still be seen in the graveyard of St Nicholas.

Lucy Louisa, her youngest daughter, died in 1826, two weeks after the birth of her daughter. She died of Scarlet Fever. She is also buried in St Nicholas Churchyard, along with her aunt, Lady Sophia Sarah Mary Fitzgerald, her unmarried aunt, who brought her up and died in 1845

== Sources ==
- Dictionary of National Biography, article Fitzgerald, Pamela.

Portrait in the collection of the National Gallery of Ireland
