= Lord Edward FitzGerald =

Irish nationalist (1763–1798)

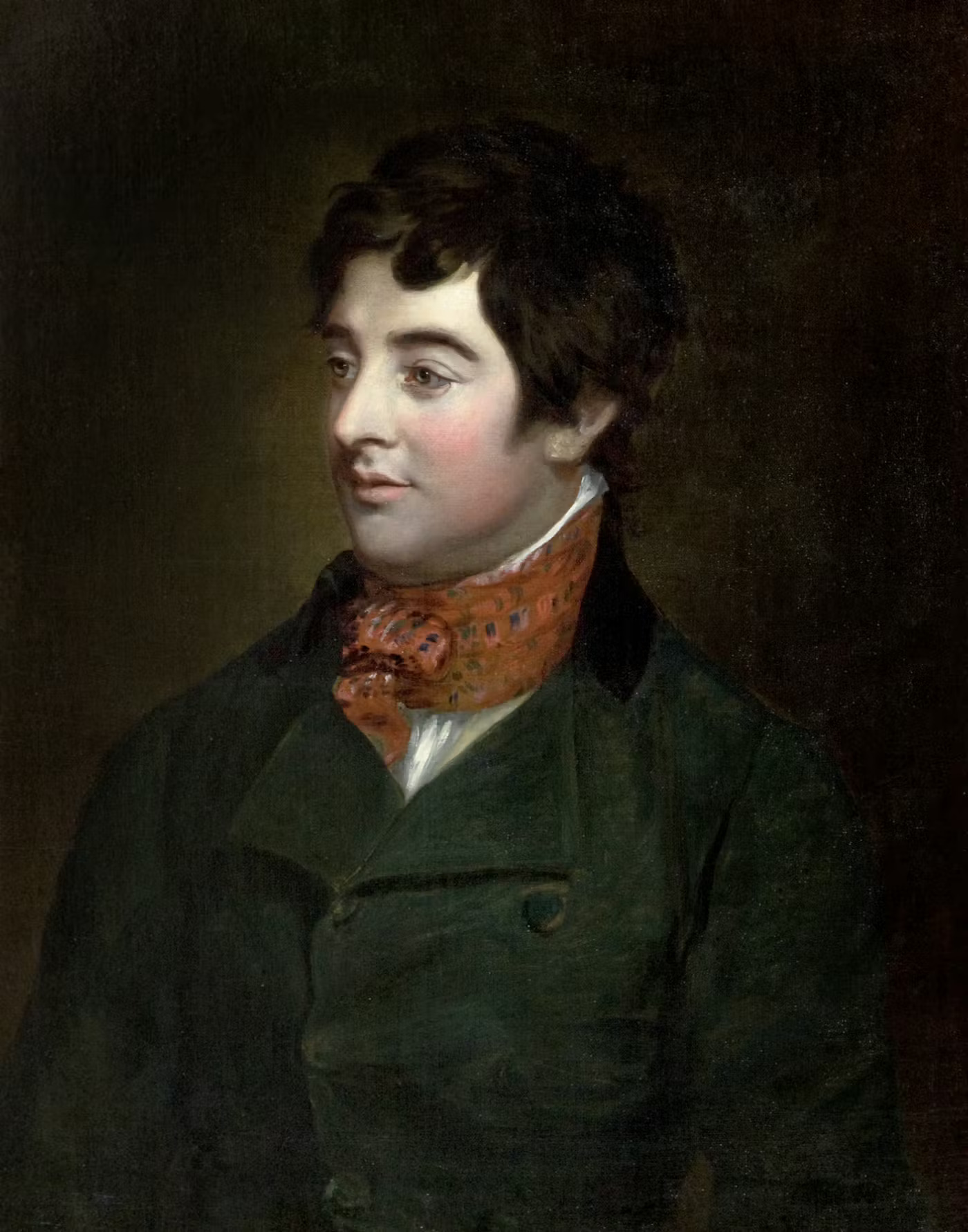
- Portrait by Hugh Douglas Hamilton, c. 1798
- Born: 15 October 1763; Carton House, County Kildare
- Died: 4 June 1798 (aged 34); Newgate Prison, Dublin, Ireland
- Burial place: St. Werburgh's Church
- Spouse: Stéphanie Caroline Anne Syms
- Children: Edward Fox; Pamela, Lady Campbell; Lucy Louisa
- Relatives: James FitzGerald, 1st Duke of Leinster (father); Lady Emilia Mary Lennox (mother); William FitzGerald, 2nd Duke of Leinster (brother)
- Military career
- Allegiance: Kingdom of Great Britain; United Irishmen
- Branch: British Army
- Service years: 1779–1790
- Rank: Major
- Conflicts: American Revolutionary War; Battle of Eutaw Springs (WIA); Irish Rebellion of 1798 (DOW)

Lord Edward FitzGerald (15 October 1763 – 4 June 1798) was an Irish aristocrat and revolutionary proponent of Irish independence from Britain. He abandoned his prospects as a distinguished veteran of British service in the American War of Independence, and as an Irish Parliamentarian, to embrace the cause in Ireland of Catholic-Protestant reconciliation and of a sovereign republic. Unable to reconcile with Ireland's Protestant Ascendancy or with the Kingdom's English-appointed administration, he sought inspiration in the American Revolution and in revolutionary France where, in 1792, he met and befriended Thomas Paine. From 1796 he became a leading proponent within the Society of United Irishmen of a French-assisted insurrection. On the eve of the intended uprising in May 1798, he was fatally wounded in the course of arrest.

== Early years ==
FitzGerald, the fifth son of the 1st Duke of Leinster and the Lady Emily Lennox (daughter of Charles Lennox, 2nd Duke of Richmond), was born at Carton House, near Dublin, and was a member of the Fitzgerald dynasty. In 1773 his father died and his mother soon afterwards married William Ogilvie, who had been the tutor for him and his siblings. He spent most of his childhood in Frescati House at Blackrock in Dublin where he was tutored by Ogilvie in a manner chiefly directed to the acquisition of knowledge that would fit him for a military career.

== American War of Independence ==
FitzGerald joined the British Army in 1779 and then became aide-de-camp on the staff of Lord Rawdon in the southern theatre of the American Revolutionary War. He was wounded in the leg at the Battle of Eutaw Springs on 8 September 1781, and was carried off the field by an escaped slave named Tony Small (see Black Loyalist). Small was a free man at the end of the war, and Lord Edward employed him from then on, and the two travelled together back to Europe. FitzGerald was evacuated from Charleston, South Carolina in 1782 when the British forces abandoned the city. Webb surmises that the success of the American colonists in fighting against regular troops led him in later years to the conviction that his countrymen in Ireland could cope with them with a similar result.

In 1783, he visited the West Indies, before returning to Ireland where, in the autumn of that year, his brother William, the 2nd Duke of Leinster, had procured Edward's election to the Irish Parliament as a Member for Athy. He held the seat, as a supporter of Henry Grattan's Patriot opposition, until 1790 (when he was replaced by his brother Henry).

== Explorer in the New World ==
In the spring of 1786, Fitzgerald took the then unusual step for a young nobleman of entering the Royal Military Academy, Woolwich, after which he made a tour through Spain in 1787. Dejected, in England, by unrequited love for his cousin Georgina Lennox (who later married the 3rd Earl Bathurst), accompanied by Small in 1788 he joined the 54th Regiment in Halifax, Nova Scotia, then a resettlement site for thousands of free ‘loyalist’ blacks, before proceeding to the garrison in New Brunswick.

During their eighteen months in North America, Fitzgerald and Small, guided by a compass, traversed the country from Fredericton, New Brunswick to Quebec, crossed Upper Canada to Detroit, where Fitzgerald was honoured with some kind of honorary affiliation (not strictly adopted as has been claimed) given the name "Eghnidal", by the chief of the Bear clan of the Kanien'kehá:ka (Mohawk), Karonghyontye (Captain David Hill), and made his way down the Mississippi to New Orleans, whence they returned to England. Of the frontier society he encountered, Fitzgerald commented: "The equality of everybody and their manner of life I like very much. There are no gentlemen, everybody is on a footing".

== Re-enters politics ==
In 1790, Fitzgerald turned down the command of an expedition against Cádiz offered him by Pitt, observing that the promotion would require him to vote in Parliament with the government and against his convictions. Instead, replaced by his brother Henry as MP for Athy, he was returned to the Irish House of Commons from County Kildare, frequently returning to visit family in England where he entered into intimate terms with his first cousin Charles Fox, with Richard Sheridan and other leading Whigs.

His Whig connections, together with his transatlantic experiences, predisposed Fitzgerald to sympathise with the doctrines of the French Revolution, which he embraced enthusiastically when he visited Paris in October 1792. He lodged with Thomas Paine and listened to the debates in the Convention. At a convivial gathering on 18 November, he supported a toast to "the speedy abolition of all hereditary titles and feudal distinctions", and gave proof of his zeal by expressly repudiating his own title, a performance for which he was dismissed from the army.

== Marries on the Continent ==
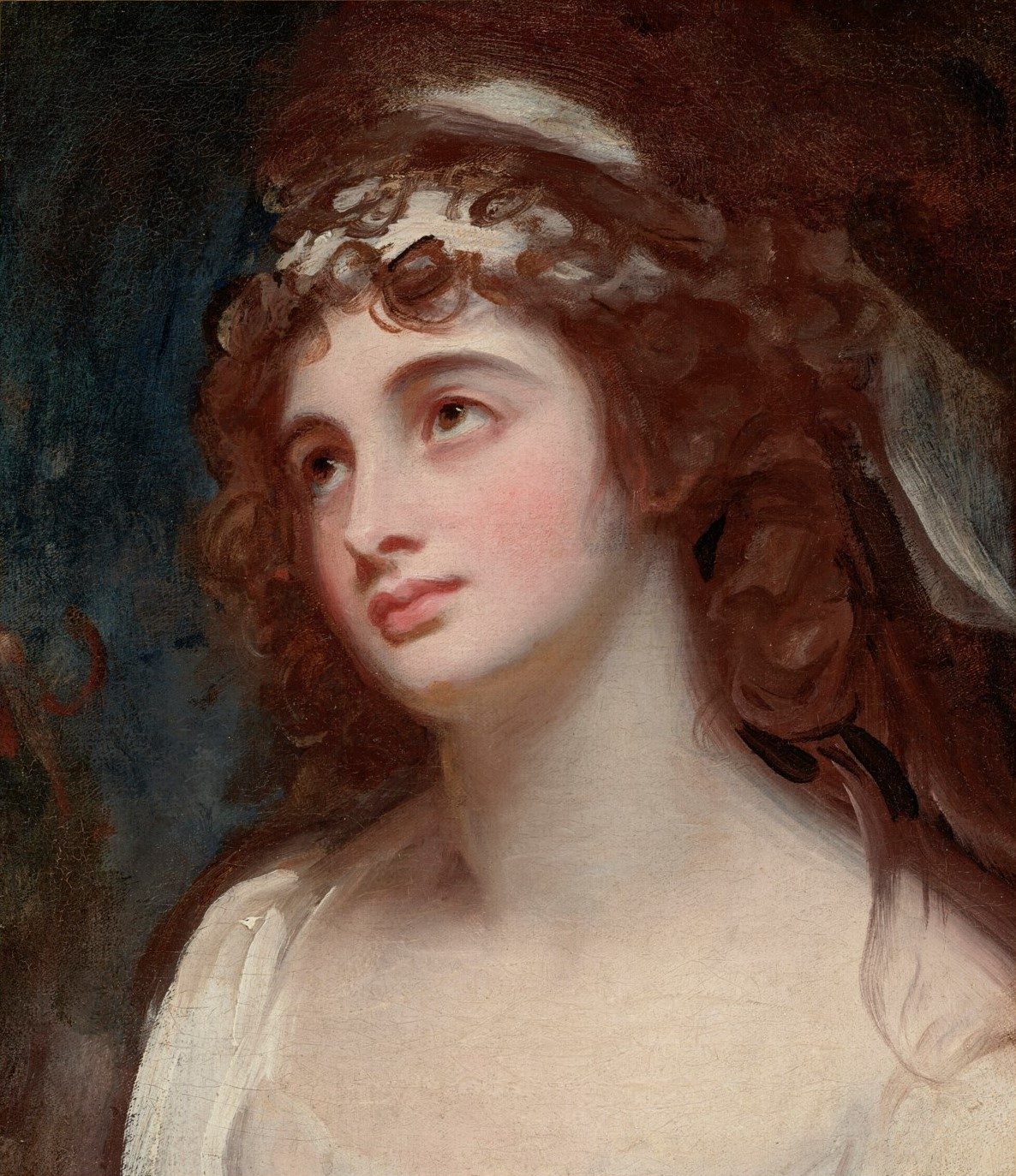
Pamela, later Lady Edward Fitzgerald (1773-1831), painting by George Romney, 1792.

According to Thomas Moore, Lord Edward FitzGerald was the only one of the numerous suitors of Sheridan's first wife, Elizabeth, whose attentions were received with favour; and it is certain that, whatever may have been its limits, a warm mutual affection subsisted between the two. She conceived a child by him, a baby girl who was born on 30 March 1792 but who died in October of the following year.

While in Paris, FitzGerald became enamoured of a young girl whom he chanced to see at the theatre, and who is said to have had a striking likeness to Elizabeth Sheridan. He discovered her to be a protégée of Stéphanie Félicité, comtesse de Genlis (Madame de Genlis, also known by her other titles as Madame de Sillery and after the revolution citizeness Brûlart) who had achieved fame as a writer and had been responsible for the education of the children of Louis Philippe II, Duke of Orléans. The girl, whose name was Ann (Nancy) Sims but was commonly known as Pamela (1773–1831), was commonly believed to be the daughter from a relationship between the duke and Mme de Genlis, but there is some evidence to support the story of Madame de Genlis that Pamela was born in Newfoundland. On 27 December 1792, FitzGerald and Pamela were married at Tournai, one of the witnesses being Louis Philippe, afterwards King of the French; and in January 1793 the couple reached Dublin.

== Return to Ireland ==
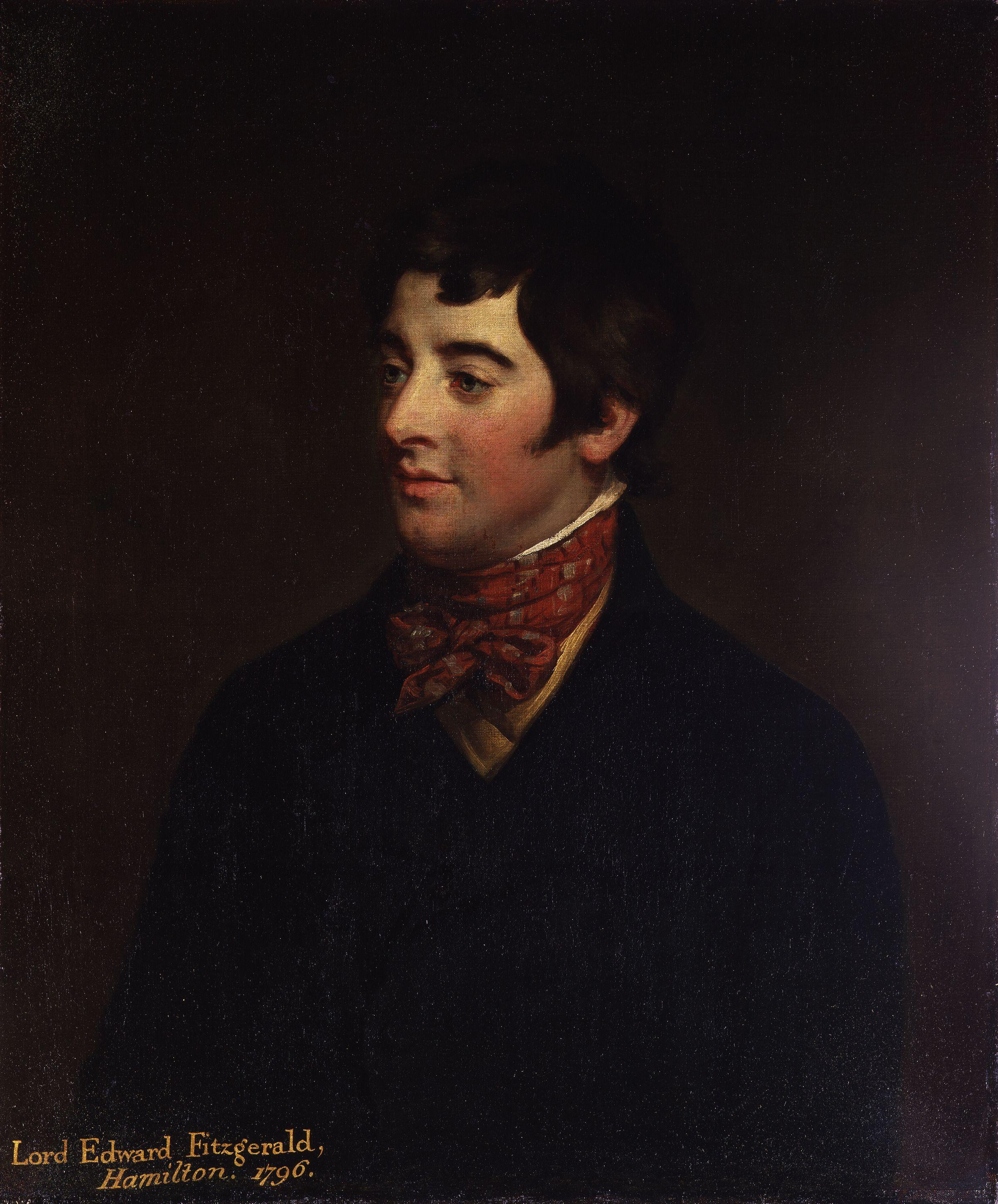
1796 portrait of FitzGerald by Hugh Douglas Hamilton

In 1793, on his return from Paris, Lord Edward fresh from the gallery of the Convention in Paris, returned to his seat in the Irish Parliament and immediately began his attack on government. He was required to apologise at the bar of the House of Commons for denouncing a Government proclamation which Grattan had approved for the suppression of the United-Irish attempt to revive the Irish Volunteer movement as a French-model "National Guard". However, it was not until 1796 that he joined the United Irishmen, who by now had given up as hopeless the path of constitutional reform and whose aim, after the recall of Lord FitzWilliam in 1795, was nothing less than the establishment of an independent Irish republic.

== Revolutionary activities ==
In May 1796, while Theobald Wolfe Tone was in Paris endeavouring to obtain French assistance for an insurrection in Ireland, FitzGerald and his friend Arthur O'Connor proceeded to Hamburg, where they opened negotiations with the French Directory through Reinhard, French minister to the Hanseatic towns, and through Finnish nobleman Johan Anders Jägerhorn (or baron de Spurila, as he called himself). The Duke of York, meeting Pamela at Devonshire House on her way through London with her husband, had told her that "all was known" about his plans, and advised her to persuade him not to go abroad. The government in London was kept apprised of Fitzgerald's contacts in Hamburg, which contributed to Hoche's abortive expedition to Ireland in December 1796, by his host, the informer, Samuel Turner.

In September 1797, the Government learnt that, back in Dublin, that Lord Edward was among those on the Leinster directory of the United Irishmen urging an insurrection. He was the colonel, or county chief, in the republicans' Kildare "regiment" and as head of the directory's military committee, in February 1798, had computed the number United Irishmen prepared to rise nationwide, at 269,896. While acknowledging their deficiency in arms, he was among the advocates of action in advance of a further French attempt on Ireland, with some evidence that he favoured a plan for the massacre of the Irish peers while in procession to the House of Lords for the trial of Lord Kingston in May 1798.

== Lead-up to arrest ==
It was probably abhorrence of such measures that converted Fitzgerald's confidante, Thomas Reynolds, from a co-conspirator to an informer; at all events, Reynolds and several others kept the authorities posted on what was going on, though lack of evidence produced in court delayed the arrest of the ringleaders. But on 12 March 1798 Reynolds' information led to the seizure of a number of conspirators at the house of Oliver Bond. Lord Edward FitzGerald, warned by Reynolds, was not among them.

As a fellow member of the Ascendancy class, the Government were anxious to make an exception for FitzGerald, avoiding the embarrassing and dangerous consequences of his subversive activities. They communicated their willingness to spare him from the normal fate meted out to traitors. The Lord Chancellor, Lord Clare, said to a member of his family, "For God's sake get this young man out of the country; the ports shall be thrown open, and no hindrance whatever offered".

FitzGerald, however, refused to desert others who could not escape, and whom he had himself led into danger. On 30 March the government proclamation of martial law authorising the military to act as they saw fit to crush the United Irishmen led to a campaign of vicious brutality in several parts of the country. This forced the United Irish executive to bring forward plans for the rising, with or without French aid.

Lord Edward FitzGerald's social position made him the most important United Irish leader still at liberty. On 9 May a reward of £1,000 was offered by Dublin Castle for his apprehension. Since the arrests at Bond's, FitzGerald had been in hiding, but had twice visited his wife in disguise and was himself visited by his stepfather Ogilvie and his friend William Lawless; he generally observed less caution than his situation required. Meanwhile, the date for the rising was finally fixed for 23 May and FitzGerald awaited the day hidden by Mary Moore above her family's inn in Thomas Street Dublin.

Tipped off that the house was going to be raided, Moore turned to Francis Magan, a Catholic barrister and trusted sympathiser, who agreed to hide Fitzgerald. Making their way to Magan's on 18 May, Fitzgerald's party was challenged by Henry Sirr, the town-major of Dublin, and a company of Dumbarton Fencibles. Moore escaped with Fitzgerald (William Putnam McCabe and other of his bodyguard were arrested) and took him back to Thomas Street to the house of Nicholas Murphy.

Moore explained to Magan what had happened and, unbeknownst to her, Magan informed Dublin Castle. The Moores were raided that day. Mary, running to warn the Leinster Directory meeting nearby in James's Gate, received a bayonet cut across the shoulders.

== Arrest and death ==
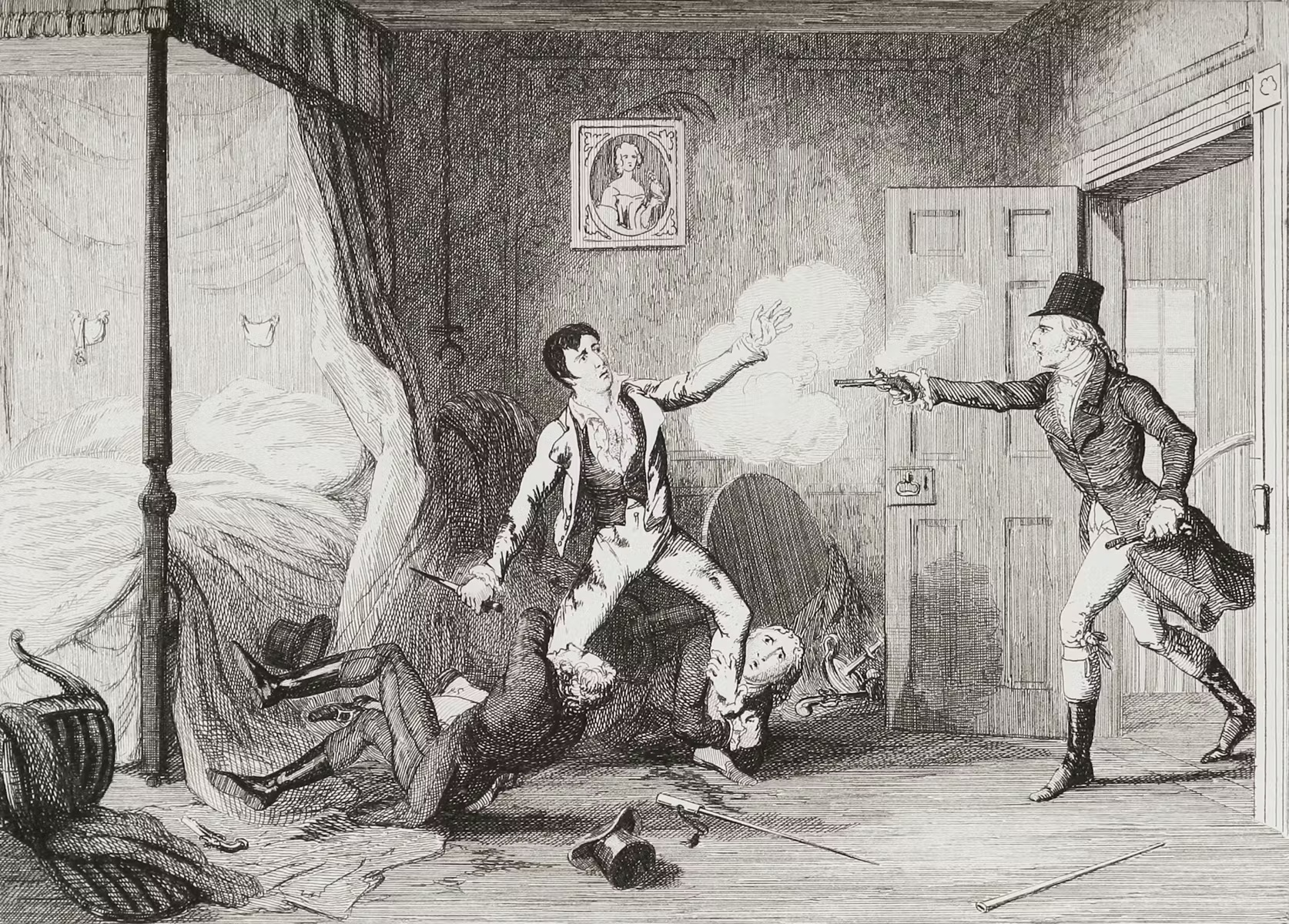
1845 engraving of Sirr shooting FitzGerald

That same evening Sirr stormed Murphy's house where Lord Edward was in bed suffering from a fever. Alerted by the commotion, FitzGerald jumped out of bed and, ignoring the pleas of the arresting officers Captain William Bellingham Swan (later assistant town Major of Dublin) and Captain Daniel Frederick Ryan to surrender peacefully, FitzGerald stabbed Swan and mortally wounded Ryan with a dagger in a desperate attempt to escape. He was secured only after Sirr shot him in the shoulder.

After a brief detention in Dublin Castle he was taken to Newgate Prison, Dublin where his wound, which had become infected, became mortally inflamed. His wife, whom the government probably had enough evidence to convict of treason, had fled the country, never to see her husband again, but Lord Edward's brother Henry and his aunt Lady Louisa Conolly were allowed to see him in his last moments. Lord Edward died at the age of 34 on 4 June 1798 as the rebellion raged outside. He was buried the next day in the crypt of St Werburgh's Church, Dublin. An Act of Attainder confiscating his property was passed as 38 Geo. 3 c. 77, but was eventually repealed in 1819.

The weapon used by Lord Edward to attack Captains Swan and Ryan while trying to escape arrest was later stolen from Major Swan's house by Emma Lucretia Dobbin, the daughter of Rev. William Dobbin and Catherine Coote. The scabbard he reputedly had at his arrest is held at Limerick Museum.

== Character assessment ==
There is evidence that, shortly after his death, Fitzgerald's sister, Lady Lucy FitzGerald, intended to publish a statement. The following was found among her papers but there is no evidence that it was ever printed:

Irishmen, Countrymen, it is Edward FitzGerald's sister who addresses you: it is a woman but that woman is his sister: she would therefore die for you as he did. I don't mean to remind you of what he did for you. 'Twas no more than his duty. Without ambition he resigned every blessing this world could afford to be of use to you, to his Countrymen whom he loved better than himself, but in this he did no more than his duty; he was a Paddy and no more; he desired no other title than this.

Fitzgerald was of small stature and handsome features. In the opinion of the McNeill biography in the Encyclopædia Britannica eleventh edition (1911) Fitzgerald's character and career have been made the subject of eulogies much beyond their merits.

The same writer claims:

He had, indeed, a winning personality, and a warm, affectionate and generous nature, which made him greatly beloved by his family and friends; he was humorous, light-hearted, sympathetic, adventurous. But he was entirely without the weightier qualities requisite for such a part as he undertook to play in public affairs. Hotheaded and impulsive, he lacked judgement. He was as conspicuously deficient in the statesmanship as he was in the oratorical genius of such men as Flood, Plunket or Grattan. One of his associates in conspiracy described him as 'weak and not fit to command a sergeant's guard, but very zealous'. Reinhard, who considered Arthur O'Connor 'a far abler man', accurately read the character of Fitzgerald as that of a young man "incapable of falsehood or perfidy, frank, energetic, and likely to be a useful and devoted instrument; but with no experience or extraordinary talent, and entirely unfit to be chief of a great party or leader in a difficult enterprise.

This opinion is not that held in Ireland, where Fitzgerald is remembered as brave and sweet-natured, a clever planner, and a tragic loss. His funeral is described:

Keen to avoid any display of the enormous popular feeling towards Lord Edward, Castlereagh ensured that the funeral took place in secret at 2am and that the body was not allowed to return to Kildare. On its way to St Werburgh’s in the shadow of the Castle, the funeral was frequently stopped and searched by parties of soldiers. Even after the lead coffin was laid in the vault at dead of night, the mourners were obliged to stay in the church until passes could be procured

== Family ==
Apart from the daughter born to him by Elizabeth Sheridan in 1792, Lord Edward FitzGerald had the following children with his wife Pamela:

- Edward Fox FitzGerald (10 October 1794 – 25 January 1863) who married on 6 November 1827 to Jane Paul (died 2 November 1891)
- Pamela FitzGerald (1795/1796 - 25 November 1869), married on 21 November 1820 Sir Guy Campbell, 1st Baronet (died 26 January 1849)
- Lucy Louisa FitzGerald (1798 - September 1826), married on 5 September 1825 Capt. George Francis Lyon (died 8 October 1832).

== Commemoration ==
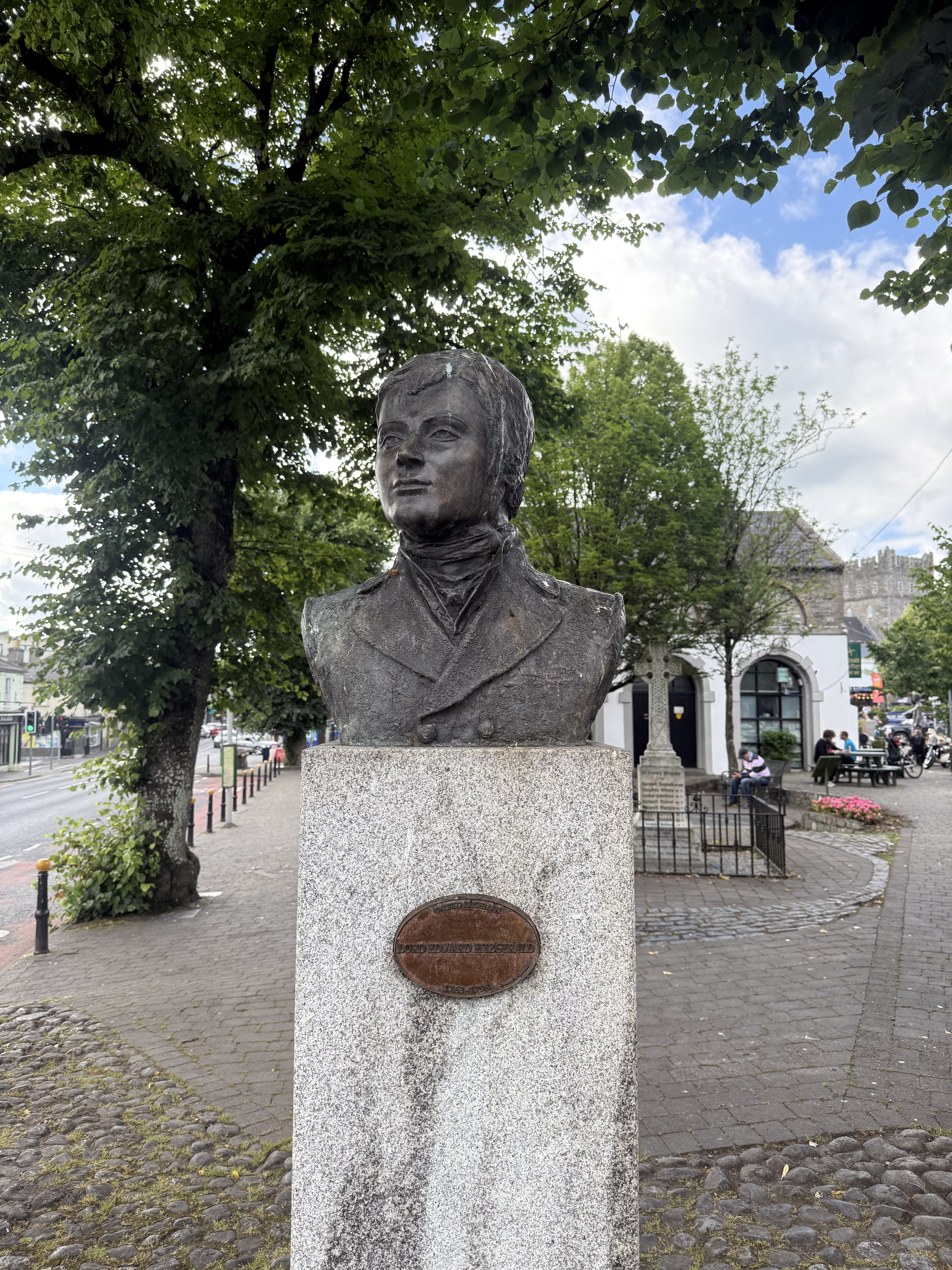
Statue of Lord Edward FitzGerald at Kildare

There are three contemporary portraits of Fitzgerald, two held in the National Gallery of Ireland in Dublin, and one in the National Portrait Gallery in London. There is a 1798 bi-centenary bronze bust commemorating him in the Market Square in Kildare. In 1831 Thomas Moore published a biography The Life and Death of Lord Edward Fitzgerald.

In several places in Ireland – Dublin, Limerick, Sligo, Kilkenny, Ballina, Ballymote, and Ballycullenbeg in County Laois – there are streets named in his honour .

The County Roscommon GAA club Tulsk Lord Edward's is named after Fitzgerald. The Geraldines P. Moran GAA club in Cornelscourt in Dublin is also partly named after him.

== Bibliography ==
- Alger, John Goldworth (1889). "Fitzgerald, Edward (1763–1798)" . In Stephen, Leslie (ed.). Dictionary of National Biography. Vol. 19. London: Smith, Elder & Co. pp. 110–111.
- Bourke, Angela (2002), The Field Day Anthology of Irish Writing, NYU Press, p. 59
- Copland-Griffiths, Frederick (3 October 1908), "Sir William Neville Hart and his Descendants", Notes and Queries, 10 S. X.: 264
- Tillyard, Stella (1998), Citizen Lord: The Life of Edward Fitzgerald, Irish Revolutionary (1st American ed.), New York: Farrar, Straus, and Giroux, ISBN 978-0-374-12383-3; UK edition: Citizen Lord: Edward Fitzgerald, 1763-1798 (Chatto & Windus, 1997) ISBN 978-0-701-16538-3

Attribution:

Parliament of Ireland
Preceded by Thomas Burgh; Thomas Burgh	Member of Parliament for Athy; 1783–1790; With: Thomas Burgh	Succeeded by Lord Henry FitzGerald; Arthur Ormsby
Preceded by Lord Charles FitzGerald; John Wolfe	Member of Parliament for County Kildare; 1790–1798; With: Maurice Bagenal St Leger Keating	Succeeded by John La Touche; Maurice Bagenal St Leger Keating
